= Talmi =

Talmi is a Jewish surname. People with the surname include:

- Emma Talmi (1905–2004), Israeli politician
- Igal Talmi (1925–2026), Israeli nuclear physicist
- Leon Talmi (1893–1952), Russian-American Yiddish journalist
- Meir Talmi (1909–1994), Israeli politician
- Yoav Talmi (born 1943), Israeli conductor and composer

== See also ==
- Talmi-Teshub, Hittite viceroy of Carchemish
- Talmy, list of people with a similar surname
