= Aharon Efrat =

Israeli politician (1911–1989)

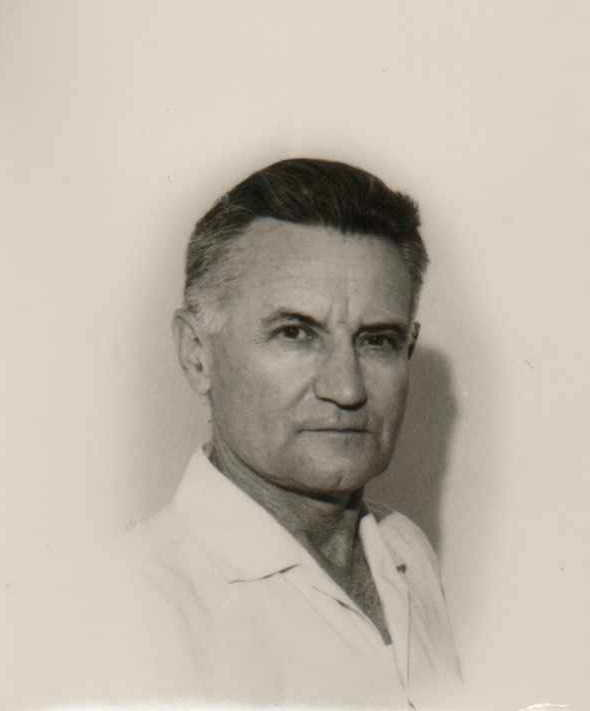
- Efrat in the mid-1970s

Faction represented in the Knesset
- 1974–1977: Alignment
- 1977: Mapam

Personal details
- Born: 20 March 1911 Lutsk, Russian Empire
- Died: 16 May 1989 (aged 78)

Aharon Efrat (Hebrew: אהרון אפרת; 20 March 1911 – 16 May 1989) was an Israeli politician who served as a member of the Knesset for the Alignment and Mapam between 1974 and 1977.

== Biography ==
Born in Lutsk in the Russian Empire (today in Ukraine), Efrat joined Hashomer Hatzair at the age of 16. He was amongst the leaders of the movement in Poland and was the head of its Aliyah Department between 1933 and 1935, when he became a member of the movement's world leadership. In 1934 he became a member of the central committee of the HeHalutz movement and was also involved in its aliyah activities.

In 1936 he emigrated to Mandatory Palestine and was amongst the founders of kibbutz Ein HaShofet the following year. In 1944 he became the secretary of the Hashomer Hatzair Workers Party and the Socialist League in Haifa.

In 1954 Efrat became secretary of Mapam, a position he held until 1957. In 1960 he became secretary of the party's central committee. He was also involved in the Histadrut trade union, serving as head of its Social Welfare Department from 1964 to 1967, and as a member of its co-ordinating committee from 1964 until 1974. In 1972 he joined the Advisory Committee and the Advisory Board at the Bank of Israel, which he remained a member of until 1980.

In 1973 he was elected to the Knesset on the Alignment list, an alliance of Mapam and the Labor Party. On 10 April 1977 Mapam broke away from the Alignment but rejoined two days later. Efrat lost his seat in the 1977 elections. Later that year he became a member of the board of directors at Israel Chemicals, on which he served until 1983.

He died in 1989 at the age of 78.
