= Dov Bar-Nir =

Israeli politician (1911–2000)

Faction represented in the Knesset
- 1949–1951: Mapam

Personal details
- Born: 3 December 1911; Brussels, Belgium
- Died: 7 May 2000 (aged 88)

Dov Bar-Nir (Hebrew: דב בר-ניר; 3 December 1911 – 7 May 2000) was a Belgium-born Israeli politician who served as a member of the Knesset for Mapam between 1949 and 1951.

== Biography ==
Born Bernard Silberschatz in Brussels in Belgium, Bar-Nir studied social science at the University of Strasbourg, where he was awarded a PhD. He was amongst the founders of the Hashomer Hatzair movement in Belgium.

He emigrated to Mandatory Palestine in 1932, and joined kibbutz Ein HaHoresh, where he lived until 1956. He was a member of the Socialist League party, which later merged with the HaKibbutz HaArtzi movement to form the Hashomer Hatzair Workers Party, which he served as secretary of from its foundation in 1946 until its merger into Mapam in 1948.

In the 1949 elections he won a seat on Mapam's list. In 1950, he was sent to the United States to work as an emissary of Hashomer Hatzair. He subsequently resigned from the Knesset and was replaced by Menachem Ratzon on 10 April 1951. Between 1951 and 1953, he served as secretary of Mapam's central committee and, from 1957 until 1960, as secretary of the World Union of Mapam.

After retiring from the Knesset, he published several books, including Trends in Modern Art (1954), From Jabotinsky to Begin: Portrait of a Movement (1982), Politicide: An Israel Socialist Answers a Foreign Socialist (1982), The Confrontation: Ben-Gurion and Jabotinsky (1987) and Opinions Make Their Way.
