= Yehuda Dranitzki =

Israeli politician (1910–2002)

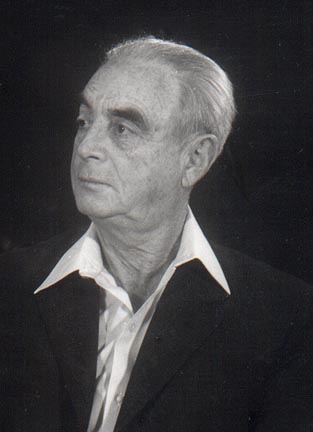
- Dranitzki in the mid-1970s

Faction represented in the Knesset
- 1974-1977: Alignment
- 1977: Mapam

Personal details
- Born: 26 April 1910 Odessa, Russian Empire
- Died: 14 June 2002 (aged 92)

Yehuda Dranitzki (Hebrew: יהודה דרניצקי; 26 April 1910 – 14 June 2002) was an Israeli politician who served as a member of the Knesset for the Alignment and Mapam between 1974 and 1977.

== Biography ==
Born in Odessa in the Russian Empire, Dranitzki joined Hashomer Hatzair after it had been banned by Soviet authorities. In 1925 he emigrated to Mandatory Palestine, where he joined Poale Zion Left. He was amongst the founders of the Marxist Studies Group and the Socialist League, and was an activist for the Hashomer Hatzair Workers Party and later Mapam.

In 1942 he became a member of Tel Aviv Workers Council. In 1949 he joined the Histadrut's executive committee and became a member of its organising committee in 1955. In 1966 he was appointed chairman of the union's Department for Industrial Democracy and was also a lecturer at the School for Histadrut Activists.

In 1973 he was elected to the Knesset on the Alignment list, an alliance of Mapam and the Labor Party. On 10 April 1977 Mapam broke away from the Alignment but rejoined two days later. Dranitzki lost his seat in the 1977 elections.

He died in 2002 at the age of 92.
