= Hanan Rubin =

Israeli politician (1908–1962)

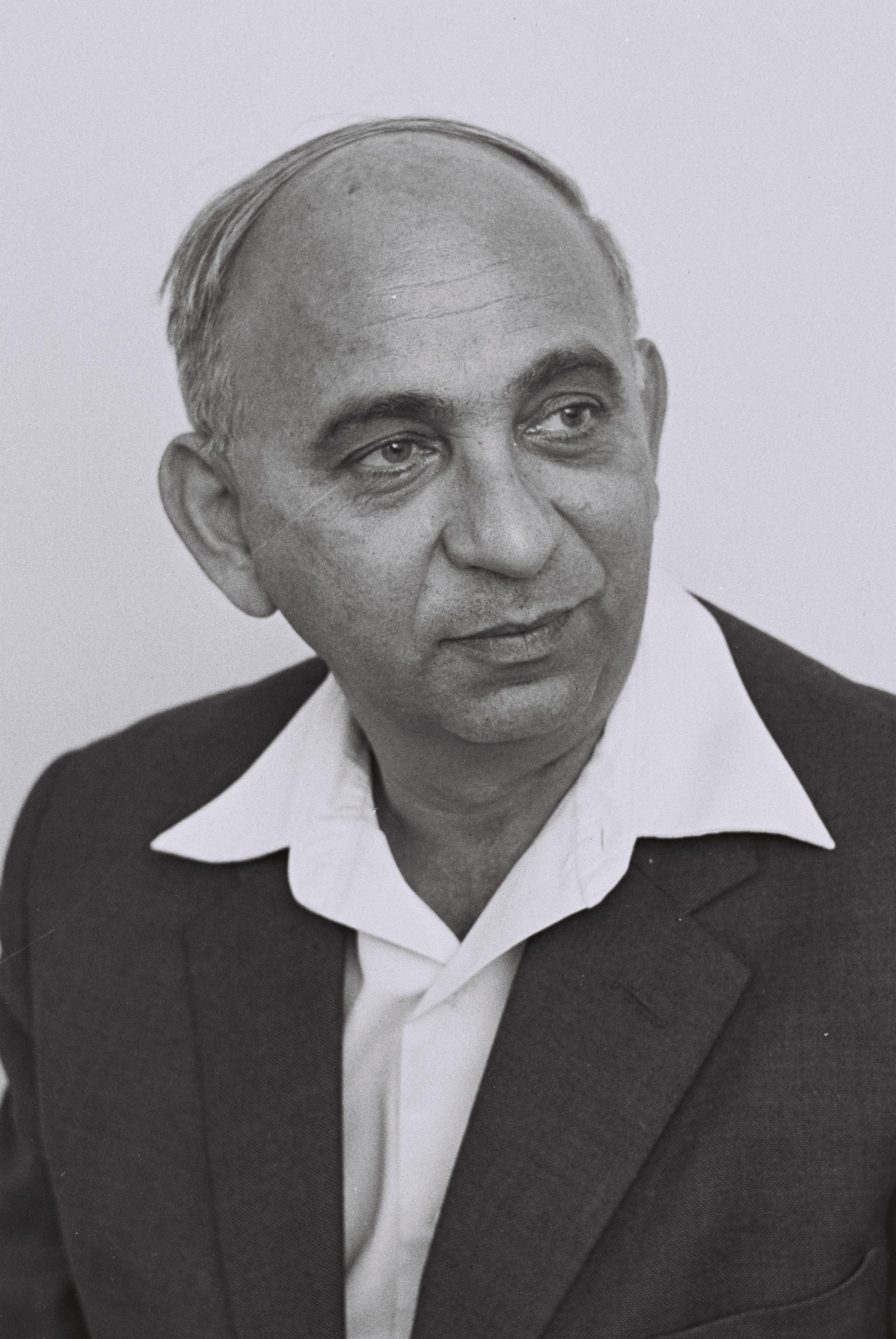
- Rubin in 1959

Faction represented in the Knesset
- 1949–1962: Mapam

Personal details
- Born: 10 August 1908 Berlin, Germany
- Died: 24 October 1962 (aged 54)

Hanan Rubin (Hebrew: חנן רובין; 10 August 1908 – 24 October 1962) was a German-born Israeli politician who served as a member of the Knesset between 1949 and 1962.

== Biography ==
Born Hans Rubin in Berlin, Rubin was a member of the Blue-White movement during his youth. After school he studied law at the Humboldt University of Berlin and University of Freiburg, receiving his law doctorate in 1932. Whilst at university, he was a member of the central committee of the Federation of Student Unions. In 1930 he joined the Social Democratic Party, before switching to the small left-wing Socialist Workers' Party.

In 1933 Rubin made aliyah to Mandatory Palestine, where he initially worked as an agricultural laborer, before starting working for the Histadrut trade union in 1934. He was amongst the founders of the Socialist League in 1936, and was a member of the Assembly of Representatives. After this merged into the Hashomer Hatzair Workers Party, and then Mapam, he was amongst the leaders of the new party. In the 1949 elections he was elected to the Knesset on Mapam's list. He was re-elected in 1951, 1955, 1959 and 1961, serving as Deputy Speaker for his last three terms. He died on 24 October 1962 and was replaced by Yosef Kushnir.
