= Reuven Arazi =

Israeli politician (1907–1983)

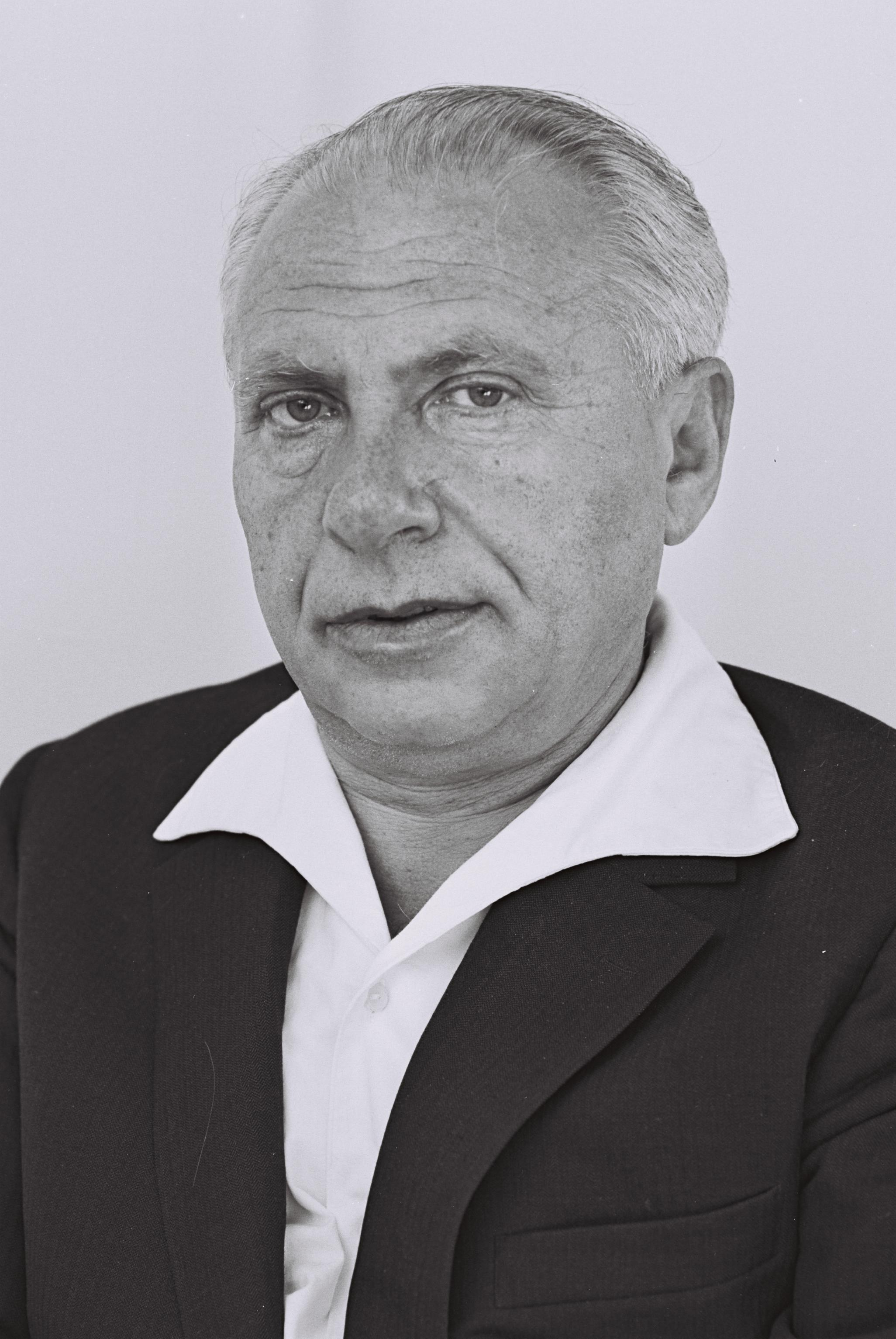
- Arazi in 1965

Faction represented in the Knesset
- 1965–1969: Mapam
- 1969–1974: Alignment

Personal details
- Born: 11 May 1907; Mezhirichi, Russian Empire
- Died: 19 May 1983 (aged 76)

Reuven Arazi (Hebrew: ראובן ארזי; 11 May 1907 – 19 May 1983) was an Israeli politician who served as a member of the Knesset for Mapam and the Alignment between 1965 and 1974.

== Biography ==
Born in Mezhirichi in the Russian Empire (today in Ukraine), Arazi was educated at a gymnasium in Poland, before studying law in Warsaw, where he was certified as a lawyer. He also graduated from the Judaic Studies Institute in the city. Whilst a student he was amongst the leadership of the Socialist Zionist student movement, and also joined Hashomer Hatzair.

Between 1933 and 1939 he worked in the Tarbut school system, but in 1940, following the Soviet invasion of Poland, was exiled to the Urals by the Soviet authorities. He returned to Poland in 1946 and re-established Hashomer Hatzair, becoming its secretary general. He was also involved with the Jewish National Fund, becoming a member of its board of directors.

In 1949 he emigrated to Israel, where he joined Mapam, which had been formed by a merger of the Hashomer Hatzair Workers Party and the Ahdut HaAvoda Poale Zion Movement. In 1959, he became the party's political secretary, a role he held until 1965. In that year he was placed fifth on the Mapam list for the Knesset elections, and was elected to the Knesset as the party won eight seats. He was re-elected in 1969 (by which time Mapam had formed the Alignment alliance), and was appointed Deputy Speaker of the Knesset. He was placed 103rd on the Alignment list for the 1973 elections, losing his seat as the alliance won 41 seats.

He died in 1983 at the age of 76.
