= Menachem Bader =

Israeli politician

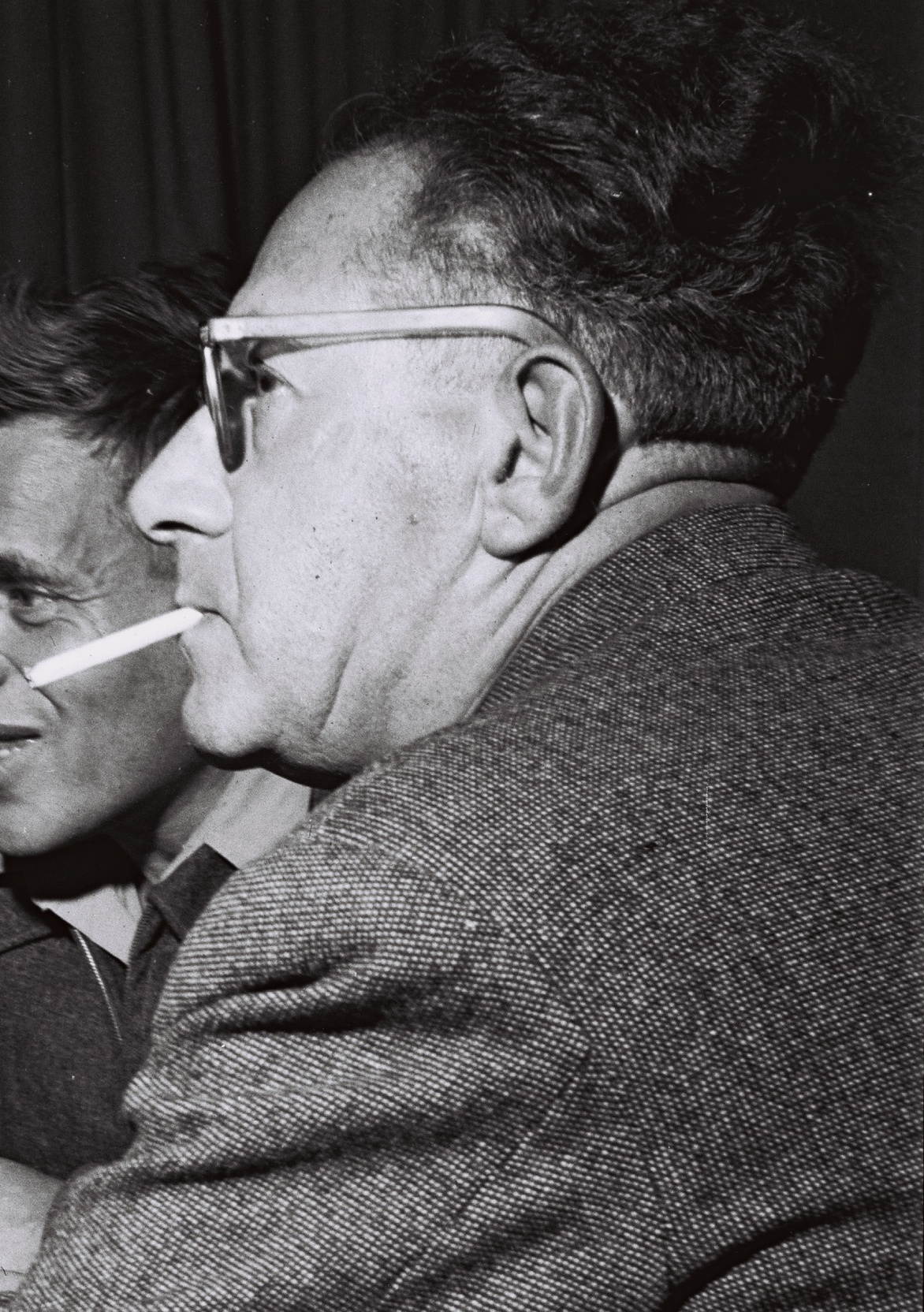

Faction represented in the Knesset
- 1949–1951: Mapam

Personal details
- Born: 20 September 1895; Dukla, Austria-Hungary
- Died: 31 January 1985 (aged 89); Mizra, Israel

Menachem Bader (Hebrew: מנחם בדר; 20 September 1895 – 31 January 1985) was a Labor Zionist activist during the Mandate era, and later a politician who served as a member of the Knesset.

== Biography ==
Born in Dukla in the Kingdom of Galicia and Lodomeria of Austria-Hungary (today in Poland), Bader's family moved to Germany during his youth. He studied in a Gymnasium, before studying economics at the University of Cologne. In 1920 the family emigrated to Palestine.

The year after immigrating Bader became a member of the Haganah planning committee. A member of the Histadrut trade union, and later its Actions Committee, he was amongst the founders of the gar'in which established kibbutz Mizra. He was also a member of Hapoel Hatzair and HaMerkaz HaHakla'i, and in 1930 joined Hashomer Hatzair.

He was amongst the founders of the Solel Boneh construction company and was involved in developing industry in kibbutzim. He also served as a delegate to several Zionist congresses, and was a deputy member of the Zionist Actions Committee. During World War II he served as an emissary of the Yishuv's rescue committee.

Following independence in 1948 he worked as Director General of the Ministry of Labor and Construction. In 1949, he was elected to the first Knesset on the Mapam list, but lost his seat in the 1951 elections. Between 1955 and 1962 he worked as Director General of the Ministry of Development.

He died in 1985 at the age of 89.
