= Israel Shtime =

- Type: Weekly
- Publisher: Mapam
- Editor: David Shtokfish
- Founded: 1956
- Ceased publication: 1997
- Political alignment: Labour Zionism
- Language: Yiddish language
- Headquarters: Tel Aviv
- OCLC number: 36354271

Israel Shtime (Yiddish: ישראל שטימע, 'Israel Voice') was a Yiddish-language newspaper published from Tel Aviv. It was an organ of the Mapam party. David Shtokfish was the founder of the newspaper, and served as its editor until the end. Initially it was a weekly newspaper, but was converted into a fortnightly and later into a monthly publication. Israel Shtime closed down in October 1997, after 41 years of publishing.
