= LaMerhav =

Daily Israeli newspaper published from 1954 to 1971

- Owner(s): Ahdut HaAvoda (1954–1968); HaKibbutz HaMeuhad (1968–1971)
- Founded: 2 June 1954
- Ceased publication: 31 May 1971
- Political alignment: Ahdut HaAvoda (1954–1968); Labor Party (1968–1971)
- Language: Hebrew

LaMerhav (Hebrew: למרחב) was a Hebrew language daily newspaper published in Israel between 1954 and 1971.

The paper was owned by the Ahdut HaAvoda party and later HaKibbutz HaMeuhad, and was edited by Yisrael Even-Nur, Moshe Carmel and David Padhatzor, though most of its articles were written by Yisrael Galili.

== History ==
The paper's first edition was released on 2 June 1954, when it was defined as a political magazine. In December 1954 it became a daily newspaper following the party's separation from Mapam. In 1968 control of the newspaper passed to HaKibbutz HaMeuhad following the merger of Ahdut HaAvoda into the Labor Party. The last edition was published on 31 May 1971, with the paper merged into the Histadrut-affiliated Davar, which was officially renamed "Davar - Meuhad Im LaMerhav" (lit. Davar - united with LaMerhav).

== See also ==
- Journalism in Israel
