= Ya'akov Riftin =

Israeli politician

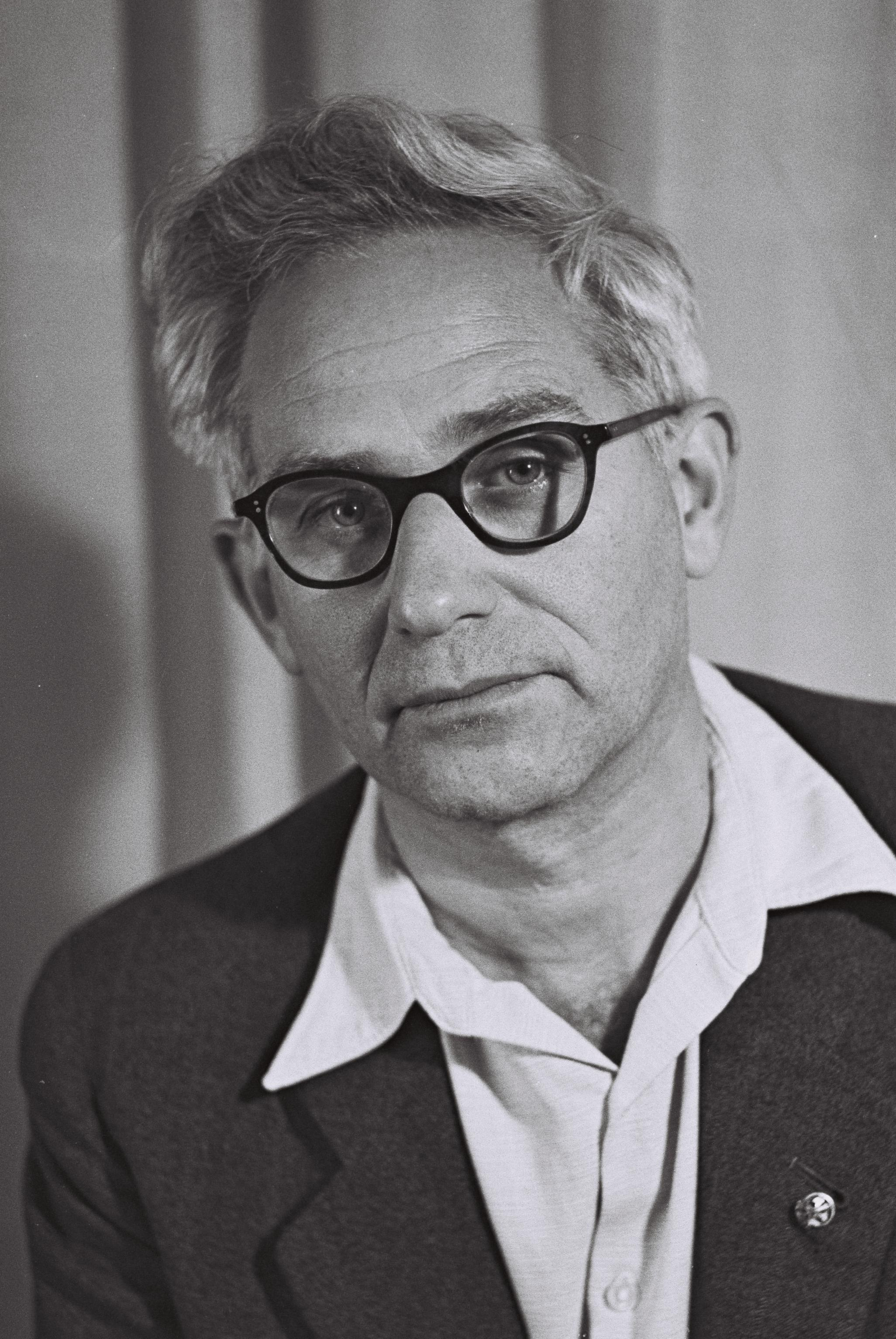
- Riftin in 1951

Faction represented in the Knesset
- 1949–1965: Mapam

Personal details
- Born: 16 March 1907 Wólka Profecka, Russian Empire
- Died: 14 May 1978 (aged 71)

Ya'akov Riftin (Hebrew: יעקב ריפתין; 16 March 1907 – 14 May 1978) was an Israeli politician who served as a member of the Knesset for Mapam between 1949 and 1965.

== Biography ==
Born in Wólka Profecka near Puławy in the Russian Empire (today in Poland), Riftin joined the HaShomer youth movement, and was later a member of Hashomer Hatzair, becoming one of the leaders of the movement in Poland. He made aliyah to Mandatory Palestine in 1929, and joined kibbutz Ein Shemer in 1931.

Riftin also joined the Histadrut trade union, becoming a member of its executive committee and co-ordinating committee. He served as a member of the Assembly of Representatives and of the Jewish National Council, as well as being a member of the Yishuv's security committee.

During 1947 and 1948 he was part of the Jewish delegation to the United Nations, and served as the political secretary of the Israeli delegation from independence (in 1948) until 1954. Despite being part of the UN delegation, he was elected to the Knesset in 1949, and was re-elected in 1951, 1955, 1959 and 1961. According to the Vasili Mitrokhin documents, Riftin regularly passed on classified documents, including top secret ones, to the Soviet Embassy.

He lost his seat in the 1965 elections. A member of the left-wing group in Mapam, he left the party in 1968 when it formed an alliance with the Labor Party in 1968, and formed the Left Independent Socialist Zionist Union, which unsuccessfully ran in Histadrut elections. He died in 1978.
