= Muhammed Wattad =

Arab-Israeli politician (1937–1994)

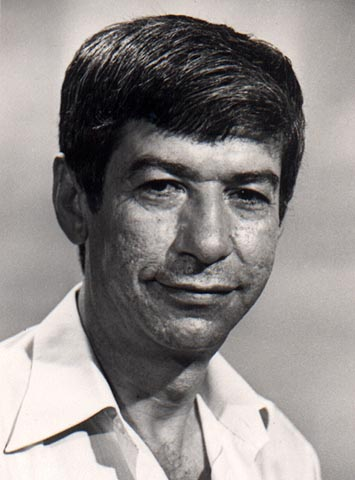
- Wattad in the 1980s

Faction represented in the Knesset
- 1981–1984: Alignment
- 1984–1988: Mapam
- 1988: Hadash

Personal details
- Born: 1 June 1937 Jatt, Mandatory Palestine
- Died: 24 September 1994 (aged 57)

Muhammed Wattad (Arabic: محمد وتد, Hebrew: מוחמד ותד; 1 June 1937 – 24 September 1994) was an Israeli Arab journalist, writer and politician who served as a member of the Knesset between 1981 and 1988.

== Biography ==
Born in Jatt during the Mandate era, Wattad was a member of the Israeli Communist Youth and Hashomer Hatzair. He attended Tel Aviv University, where he took Asian and African Studies.

A member of Mapam, he edited the Arabic-language version of the party's newspaper, Al HaMishmar. In 1981 he was elected to the Knesset on the Alignment list (an alliance of Mapam and the Labor Party). He was re-elected in 1984, shortly after which Mapam left the Alignment. On 12 July 1988 he left Mapam to join Hadash, due to disappointment with Mapam's policy towards the First Intifada, and his dissatisfaction with the lack of Arab representation in the party.

He lost his seat in the 1988 elections. After leaving politics, he managed and edited the Kul al-Arab newspaper, and later ran a public relations firm.

He died in 1994 following a traffic collision.
