= Gadi Yatziv =

Israeli academic and politician (1937–2004)

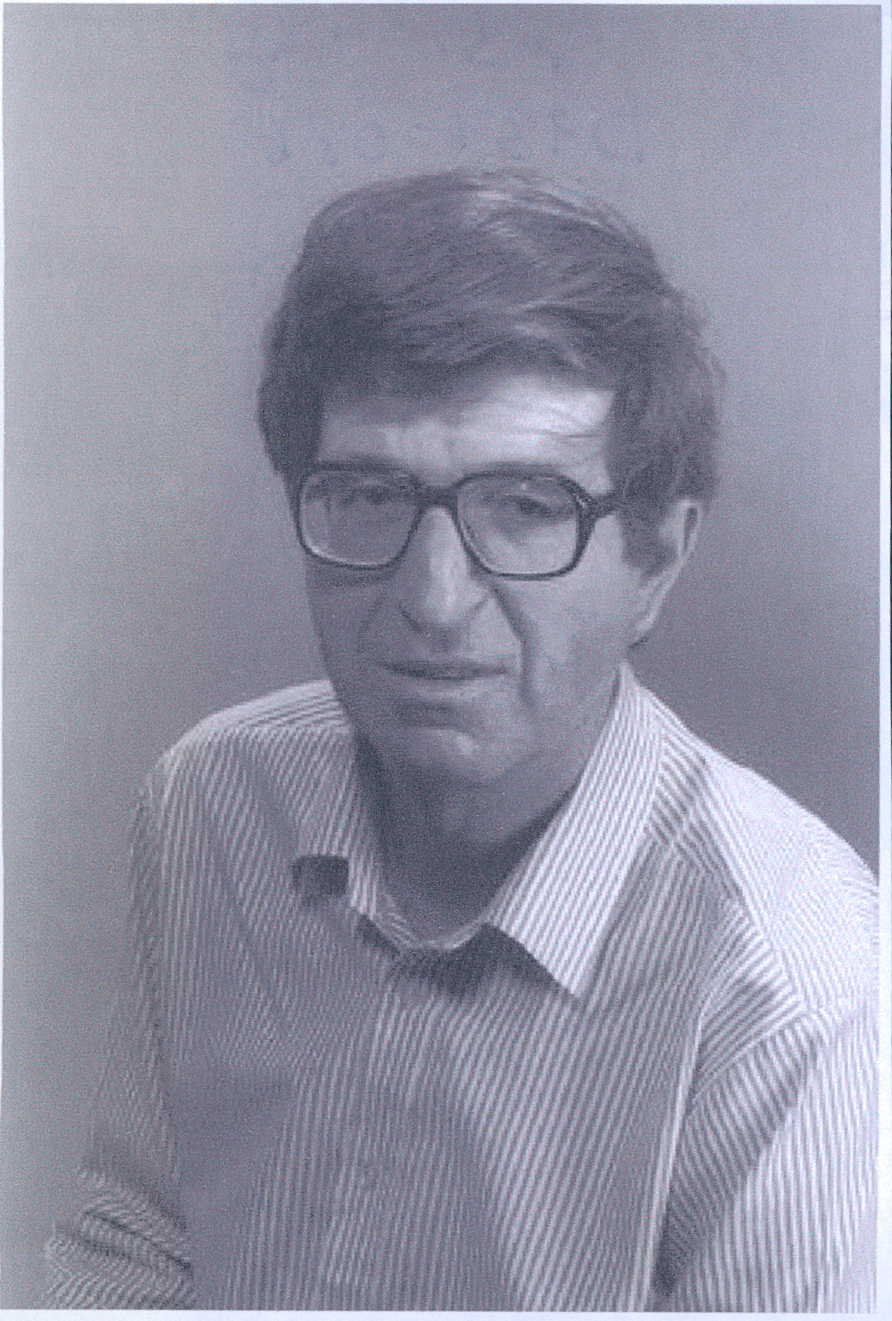
- Yatziv in 1988

Faction represented in the Knesset
- 1988: Mapam

Personal details
- Born: 5 April 1937 Na'an, Mandatory Palestine
- Died: 25 September 2004 (aged 67)

Professor Gadi Yatziv (Hebrew: גדי יציב; 5 April 1937 – 25 September 2004) was an Israeli academic and politician who briefly served as a member of the Knesset for Mapam in 1988.

== Biography ==
Born in kibbutz Na'an during the Mandate era, Yatziv was educated at the Hebrew University Secondary School and was a member of the HaNoar HaOved VeHaLomed youth movement. After his IDF service, in which he served in the Paratroopers Brigade, he went on to study sociology at the Hebrew University of Jerusalem and the London School of Economics, gaining a PhD. He later taught at the Hebrew University.

In 1967 he was one of the founders of the Peace and Security Movement, and headed the Peace List in the 1969 Knesset elections, although it failed to win a seat. In the 1970s he joined the Left Camp of Israel and was amongst the founders of Peace Now. In 1979 he joined Mapam, becoming its political secretary and head of its Information Section. He was on the Alignment list (an alliance of Mapam and the Labor Party) for the 1984 elections, but failed to win a seat. Although he entered the Knesset on 15 March 1988 as a replacement for Victor Shem-Tov, he lost his seat in the November elections.

He died in 2004 at the age of 67.
