= Talmy =

Talmy is a surname. Notable people with the surname include:

- Leonard Talmy (born 1942), American linguist
- Shel Talmy (1937–2024), American record producer, songwriter and arranger

== See also ==
- Talmi
