= Labor Zionism =

Left-leaning variant of Zionism

Labor Zionism (Hebrew: ציונות סוציאליסטית, romanized: tziunut socialistit) is the left-wing, socialist variant of Zionism. For many years, it was the most significant tendency among Zionists and Zionist organizations, and was seen as the Zionist faction of the historic Jewish labour movements of Eastern Europe and Central Europe. Labor Zionism eventually developed local movements in most countries with sizable Jewish populations. Unlike the "political Zionist" tendency founded by Theodor Herzl and advocated by Chaim Weizmann, Labor Zionists did not believe that a Jewish state would be created by simply appealing to the international community or to powerful nations such as the United Kingdom, Germany, or the former Ottoman Empire. Rather, they believed that a Jewish state could only be created through the efforts of the Jewish working class making aliyah to the Land of Israel and raising a country through the creation of a Labor Jewish society with rural kibbutzim and moshavim, and an urban Jewish proletariat.

Major theoreticians of the Labor Zionist movement included Moses Hess, Nachman Syrkin, Ber Borochov, and Aaron David Gordon; and leading figures in the movement included David Ben-Gurion, Golda Meir, and Berl Katznelson. Labor Zionist parties, most notably Mapai and its successor, the Israeli Labor Party, dominated Israeli politics during the state's first three decades.

== History ==
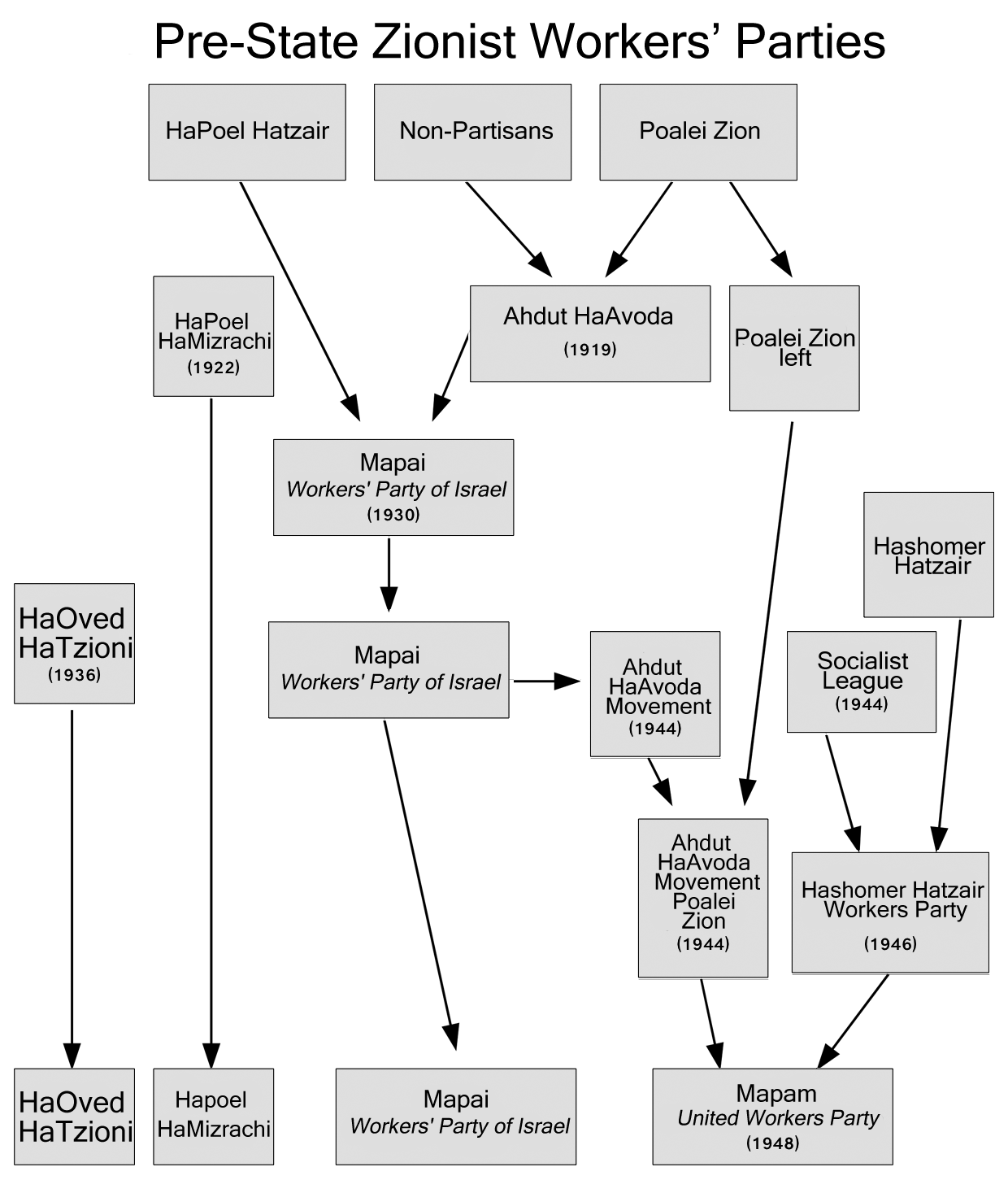
chart of zionist workers parties

=== Background ===
Before 1914, the growing alienation from Bolshevism on the one hand and the unification of the Jewish Labor Movement in Ottoman Palestine on the other hand made it possible for Zionism to gain a measure of recognition and legitimacy, particularly in the United States. The Labor Zionists differed from other labor organizations at the time since non-Zionist labor organizations were internationalist, therefore opposed to Jewish nationalism, such as the General Jewish Labour Bund in Central and Eastern Europe, which opposed the creation of a Jewish state or emigration to Palestine. The leadership of the Jewish left in the U.S. was drawn only from two distinct sources: the internationalist and cosmopolitan line of thought of the founding fathers who arrived in the 1880s, and some former members of the General Jewish Labour Bund who left the Russian Empire after 1905 and saw no contradiction between socialism and nationalism within the Jewish diaspora.

=== The Second Aliyah ===
Labor Zionism was one of the most mainstream forms of Zionism prior to and following the establishment of the State of Israel. Labor Zionism was responsible for the creation of institutions in Israel that exist today, such as the Israel Defense Forces (IDF). The predecessors of the IDF began as underground militia groups to protect Jews during the Second Aliyah in 1904. A majority of the immigrants at the time were influenced by socialist ideals, because of the Marxist ideologies spreading throughout Russia. Additionally, the First Aliyah was met by backlash because of the Rothschild family's funding of the settlements. The settlements were criticized by Nachman Syrkin and Ber Borochov, two of Labor Zionism’s founders, because Arab labor was preferred over Jewish labor. They believed that this was because of the capitalist organization of the settlements, and that a socialist solution would give priority to Jewish labor and lead to a successful establishment of a Jewish state. These values were implemented during the second Aliyah by using the Hebrew language, only hiring Jewish labor, and the creation of Bar Giora and the Hashomer, to work towards independence in this new land. In April 1913, the Poale Zion, the Labor Zionist Party, held a conference and published writing that addressed the question of Jewish defense, nationalism, and Marxism, all of which seemed to contradict. They resolved that their current conditions necessitated defense in order to solidify a place for Jewish workers, because that was being threatened. In addition, they claimed that their defense was not of private property, but of their nation. In order to establish a place for themselves, they prioritized national solidarity over international.

The Bar Giora and Hashomer were Jewish self defense organizations to protect Jewish communities who were settling in Palestine. The Bar Giora was the first, and later absorbed into Hashomer. Their establishment was in response to Arab nationalism, that they believed would ultimately lead to clashes with the Palestinian Arabs. They believed that they were the first line of defense against Arab dissent, and wanted to establish a working class in Palestine. Hashomer then became the Haganah, which was the first official military organization in Israel, which was then turned into the IDF.

=== Establishment of Labor Zionism in the mainstream ===
From its first meeting, the majority of the members of the Zionist Congress were considered General Zionists, who did not have specific political leanings or an agreed upon plan for Zionism. However, after the 1929 riots, there was a rise of Arab nationalism and resistance to Zionism. As a result, the Passfield White Paper was published, indicating a withdrawal of support of the Zionist cause. The combination of these tensions increased the necessity of having a concrete plan and Zionist ideology to follow. As a competing ideology with Revisionist Zionism, Labor Zionism gained popularity. The General Zionists began to lean towards Labor or Revisionist Zionism. During the 17th Congress in 1931, a vote would take place on whether or not the Zionist Congress would pursue the 'ultimate objective' platform of the Revisionist Zionists. During the 16 days of debate, a message was sent from Palestine, relaying the message of fear of an Arab pogrom if the 'all or nothing stance' of the Revisionist Party went through. This resulted in the rejection of the proposal. After two years of campaigning, the Labor Zionist party won the election to have leadership of the Zionist Congress at the 18th Congress in 1933.

By the 1930s, the Labor Zionist movement had substantially grown in size and influence, and eclipsed "political Zionism" both internationally and within the British Mandate of Palestine. Labor Zionists predominated among many of the institutions of the Yishuv, particularly the trade union federation known as the Histadrut. The Haganah, the largest Yishuv paramilitary, was a Labor Zionist organization. It occasionally participated in military action (such as during The Saison) against certain radical right-wing Jewish political opponents and militant groups, sometimes in cooperation with the British Mandate administration.

== Ideology ==
Moses Hess's 1862 work Rome and Jerusalem: The Last National Question argued for the Jews to settle in Palestine as a means of settling the national question. Hess proposed a socialist state in which the Jews would become agrarianized through a process of "redemption of the soil" that would transform the Jewish community into a true nation in that Jews would occupy the productive layers of society rather than being an intermediary non-productive merchant class, which is how he perceived European Jews.

Ber Borochov, continuing from the work of Moses Hess, proposed the creation of a socialist society that would correct the "inverted pyramid" of Jewish society. Borochov believed that Jews were forced out of ordinary occupations by gentile hostility and competition, using this dynamic to explain Jewish professionals' relative predominance, rather than workers. He argued that Jewish society would not be healthy until the inverted pyramid was righted, and a substantial number of Jews became workers and peasants again. This, he held, could only be accomplished by Jews in their own country.

Jonathan Frankel in his book Prophecy and Politics: Socialism, Nationalism, and the Russian Jews, 1862–1917, states that after 1905, Dov Ber Borochov, a Marxist Zionist and one of the pioneers of the Labor Zionist movement suddenly rejected voluntarism for determinism. Prior to this, Borochov regarded Palestinian colonialization as a preparatory mission to be carried out by an elite vanguard of pioneers; he developed a theory after the revolution of 1905 that indicated how inevitable Palestinian colonization by the Jewish masses was.

Another Zionist thinker, A. D. Gordon, was influenced by the völkisch ideas of European romantic nationalism, and proposed establishing a society of Jewish peasants. Gordon made a religion of work. These two figures (Gordon and Borochov), and others like them, motivated the establishment of the first Jewish collective settlement, or kibbutz, Degania Alef, on the southern shore of the Sea of Galilee, in 1909 (the same year that the city of Tel Aviv was established). Deganiah, and many other kibbutzim that were soon to follow, attempted to realize these thinkers' vision by creating communal villages, where newly arrived European Jews would be taught agriculture and other manual skills.

Joseph Trumpeldor is also considered to be one of the early icons of the Labor Zionist movement in Palestine. When discussing what it is to be a Jewish pioneer, Trumpeldor stated:

What is a pioneer? Is he a worker only? No! The definition includes much more. The pioneers should be workers but that is not all. We shall need people who will be "everything" – everything that the land of Israel needs. A worker has his labor interests, a soldier his esprit de corps, a doctor and an engineer, their special inclinations. A generation of iron-men; iron from which you can forge everything the national machinery needs. You need a wheel? Here I am. A nail, a screw, a block? – here take me. You need a man to till the soil? – I’m ready. A soldier? I am here. Policeman, doctor, lawyer, artist, teacher, water carrier? Here I am. I have no form. I have no psychology. I have no personal feeling, no name. I am a servant of Zion. Ready to do everything, not bound to do anything. I have only one aim – creation.

Trumpeldor, a Socialist Zionist, died defending the community of Tel Hai in the Upper Galilee in 1920. He became a symbol of Jewish self-defense and his reputed last words, "Never mind, it is good to die for our country" (En davar, tov lamut be'ad artzenu אין דבר, טוב למות בעד ארצנו), became famous in the pre-state Zionist movement and in Israel during the 1950s and 1960s. Trumpeldor's heroic death made him not only a martyr for Zionists Left but also for the Revisionist Zionist movement who named its youth movement Betar (an acronym for "Covenant of Joseph Trumpeldor") after the fallen hero.

Albert Einstein was a prominent supporter of both Labor Zionism and efforts to encourage Jewish–Arab cooperation. Fred Jerome in his Einstein on Israel and Zionism: His Provocative Ideas About the Middle East argues that Einstein was a Cultural Zionist who supported the idea of a Jewish homeland but opposed the establishment of a Jewish state in Palestine "with borders, an army, and a measure of temporal power." Instead, he preferred a bi-national state with "continuously functioning, mixed, administrative, economic, and social organizations." In the November 1948 presidential election Einstein supported former vice-president Henry A. Wallace's Progressive Party, which advocated a pro-Soviet foreign policy – but which also at the time (like the USSR) strongly supported the new state of Israel. Wallace went down to defeat, winning no states.

== Parties in Palestine ==
Two Zionist labor parties were established in Palestine in late 1905 (the Second Aliyah) by party organization veterans from the pale of settlement, one socialist, the Jewish Social Democratic Labour Party in Palestine, rooted in Poale Zion; the other radical, Hapoel Hatzair ("The Young Worker").

Although each party formed its own newspaper, neither compelled its contributors to pursue its own line of thinking. On the contrary, Ha-ahdut (The Unity) newspaper of Poale Zion, and still more, Hapoel Hatzair, represented the highly individualistic, disorganized and even anarchic essence of the second Aliya in their pages.

The Poale Zion-based party had a left wing and a right wing. In 1919 the right wing, including Ben-Gurion and anti-Marxist non-party people, founded Ahdut HaAvoda. In 1930 Ahdut HaAvoda and Hapoel Hatzair fused into the Mapai party, which included all of mainstream Labor Zionism. Until the 1960s these parties were dominated by members of the Second Aliyah.

The Left Poale Zion-based party ultimately merged with the kibbutz-based Hashomer Hatzair, the urban Socialist League and several smaller left-wing groups to become the Mapam party, which in turn later joined with Shulamit Aloni’s Ratz to create Meretz.

The Mapai party later became the Israeli Labor Party, which for a number of years was linked with Mapam in the Alignment. These two parties were initially the two largest parties in the Yishuv and in the first Knesset, whilst Mapai and its predecessors dominated Israeli politics both in the pre-independence Yishuv and for the first three decades of Israel's independence, until the late 1970s.

Outline of Labour Zionist and Workers' Parties
- Hapoel Hatzair	Poale Zion	Hashomer Hatzair
  Ahdut HaAvoda	Poale Zion Left
  Palestine Communist Party
  Mapai	Hashomer Hatzair Workers Party	Maki
  Ahdut HaAvoda
  Mapam
  Rafi	Ahdut HaAvoda	Left Faction
  Israeli Labor Party	Ratz	Moked	Meri
  Sheli
  Meretz
  One Nation	Shahar
  Israel Democratic Party
  The Democrats
  The main predecessors of The Democrats except Shinui, which left Meretz.

Electoral performances of Labour Zionist and Workers' Parties
	Mapai (1931–1965) Alignment/Labor (1965–1988) Labor (1992–2022)				Predecessor parties of Meretz (pre–1992) (Note: Predecessor parties counted are Mapam (1949–1965; 1988) excluding elections of 1969–1984 in which it was part of Alignment; Ratz (1973–1988); and Shinui (1977–1988)) Meretz (1992–2022)				Combined seats of both	
Election	% of vote (placement)	Seats	+/–	Status	% of vote (placement)	Seats	+/–	Status	Seats	+/–
1931	43.5 (#1)	27 / 71	new	Coalition (PM's party)	—N/a	—N/a	—N/a	—N/a	—N/a	—N/a
1944	36.5 (#1)	64 / 171	▲37	Coalition (PM's party)	—N/a	—N/a	—N/a	—N/a	—N/a	—N/a
1949	35.7 (#1)	46 / 120	▼18	Coalition (PM's party)	14.7	19 / 120	—N/a	Mapam in opposition	65 / 120	▲1
1951	37.3 (#1)	45 / 120	▼1	Coalition (PM's party)	12.5	15 / 120	▼4	Mapam in opposition	60 / 120	▼5
1955	32.2 (#1)	40 / 120	▼5	Coalition (PM's party)	7.3	9 / 120	▼4	Mapam in government	49 / 120	▼11
1959	38.2 (#1)	47 / 120	▲7	Coalition (PM's party)	7.3	9 / 120	Steady	Mapam in government	56 / 120	▲7
1961	34.7 (#1)	42 / 120	▼5	Coalition (PM's party)	7.5	9 / 120	Steady	Mapam in opposition	51 / 120	▼5
1965	36.7 (#1)	45 / 120	▲3	Coalition (PM's party)	6.6	8 / 120	▼1	Mapam in government	46 / 120	▲2
1969	46.2 (#1)	56 / 120	▲11	Coalition (PM's party)	—N/a	—N/a	—N/a	—N/a	—N/a	—N/a
1973	39.6 (#1)	51 / 120	▼5	Coalition (PM's party)	2.2	3 / 120	—N/a	Ratz spent time in opposition (1973–74; 1974–77) and government (1974)	54 / 120	▲3
1977	24.6 (#2)	32 / 120	▼19	Opposition	—N/a	7 / 120 1 / 120	—N/a	Ratz in opposition and Shinui in government	40 / 120	▼6
1981	36.6 (#2)	47 / 120	▲15	Opposition	2.9	2 / 120 1 / 120	▼5	Ratz and Shinui in opposition	50 / 120	▲4
1984	34.9 (#1)	44 / 120	▼3	Coalition (PM's party/ rotation gov)	5.1	3 / 120 3 / 120	▲3	Ratz in opposition, Shinui in government	50 / 120	Steady
1988	30.0 (#2)	39 / 120	▼5	Coalition (1988–1990)	8.5	5 / 120 2 / 120 2 / 120	▼2	Mapam, Ratz, and Shinui in opposition	49 / 120	▼1
1988	30.0 (#2)	39 / 120	▼5	Opposition (1990–1992)	8.5	5 / 120 2 / 120 2 / 120	▼2	Mapam, Ratz, and Shinui in opposition	49 / 120	▼1
1992	34.65 (#1)	44 / 120	▲5	Coalition (PM's party)	9.58 (#3)	12 / 120	▲2	Coalition	56 / 120	▲7
1996	26.83 (#1)	34 / 120	▼10	Opposition	7.41 (#5)	9 / 120	▼3	Opposition	43 / 120	▼13
1999	Part of One Israel	23 / 120	▼11	Coalition (1999–2002) (PM's Party)	7.66 (#4)	10 / 120	▲1	Coalition (1999–2000)	33 / 120	▼10
1999	Part of One Israel	23 / 120	▼11	Opposition (2002–2003)	7.66 (#4)	10 / 120	▲1	Opposition (2002–2003)	33 / 120	▼10
2003 (Note: With Meimad)	14.46 (#2)	18 / 120	▼5	Opposition (2003–2005)	5.21 (#6)	6 / 120	▼4	Opposition	24 / 120	▼9
2003	14.46 (#2)	18 / 120	▼5	Coalition (2005)	5.21 (#6)	6 / 120	▼4	Opposition	24 / 120	▼9
2003	14.46 (#2)	18 / 120	▼5	Opposition (2005–2006)	5.21 (#6)	6 / 120	▼4	Opposition	24 / 120	▼9
2006	15.06 (#2)	18 / 120	Steady	Coalition	3.77 (#9)	5 / 120	▼1	Opposition	23 / 120	▼1
2009	9.93 (#4)	13 / 120	▼5	Coalition (2009–2011)	2.95 (#10)	3 / 120	▼2	Opposition	16 / 120	▼7
2009	9.93 (#4)	13 / 120	▼5	Opposition (2011–2013)	2.95 (#10)	3 / 120	▼2	Opposition	16 / 120	▼7
2013	11.39 (#3)	15 / 120	▲2	Opposition	4.55 (#8)	6 / 120	▲3	Opposition	21 / 120	▲5
2015	Part of Zionist Union	19 / 120	▲4	Opposition	3.93 (#10)	5 / 120	▼1	Opposition	24 / 120	▲3
Apr 2019	4.43 (#6)	6 / 120	▼13	Snap election	3.63 (#9)	4 / 120	▼1	Snap election	10 / 120	▼14
Sep 2019 (Note: With Gesher)	4.80 (#9)	5 / 120	▼1	Snap election	Part of the Democratic Union	3 / 120	▼1	Snap election	8 / 120	▼2
2020	Part of Labor- Gesher-Meretz	3 / 120	▼2	Coalition (Note: Labor MKs Amir Peretz and Itzik Shmuli joined government while MK Merav Michaeli did not.)	Part of Labor- Gesher-Meretz	3 / 120	Steady	Opposition	6 / 120	▼2
2021	6.09 (#6)	7 / 120	▲4	Coalition	4.59 (#12)	6 / 120	▲3	Coalition	13 / 120	▲7
2022	3.69 (#10)	4 / 120	▼3	Opposition	3.16 (#11)	0 / 120	▼6	Extra-parliamentary	4 / 120	▼9

== Decline and transformation ==
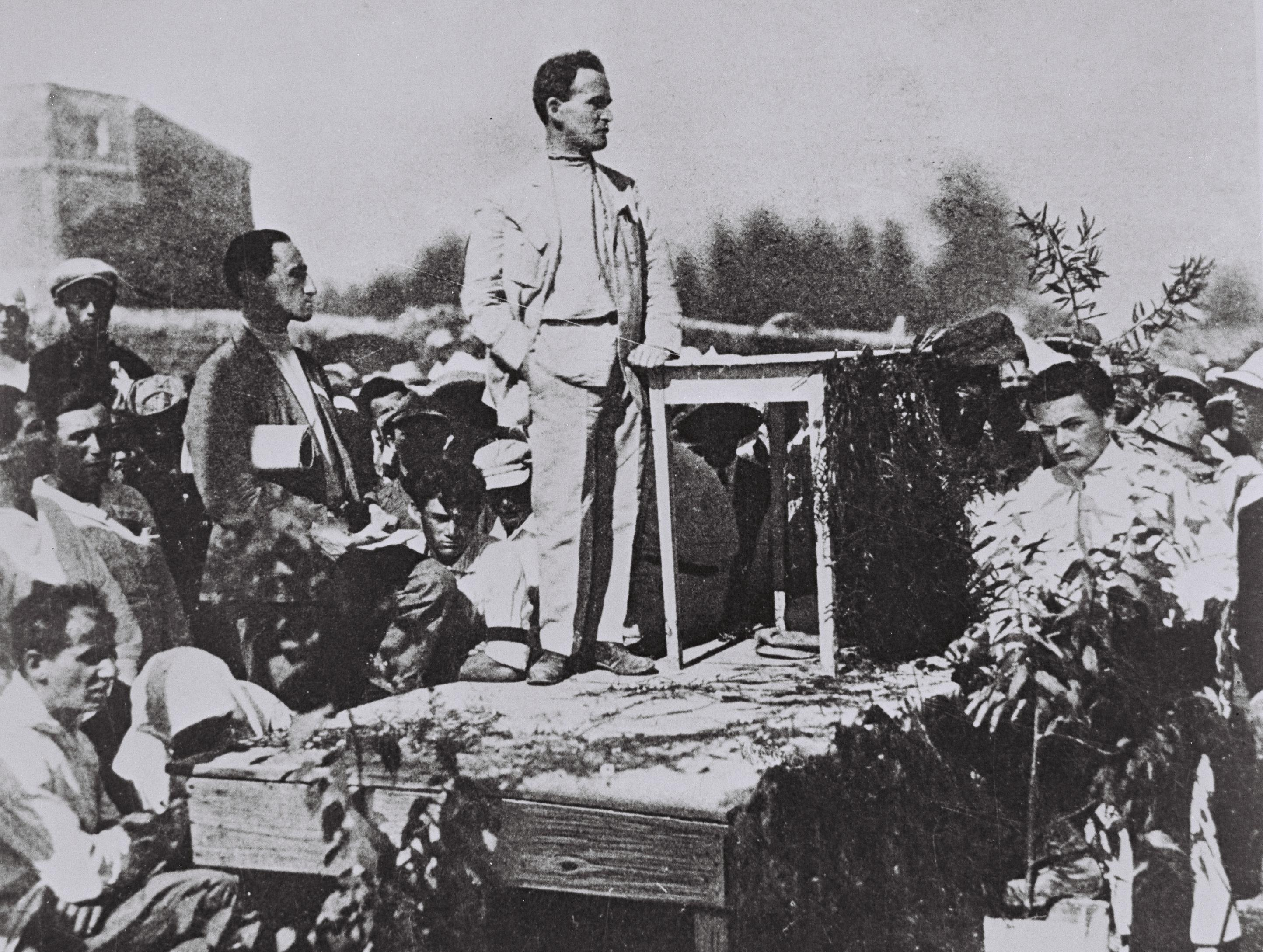
Ben Gurion speaking at the cornerstone laying ceremony for Histadrut building in Jerusalem, 1924

Prior to the fourteenth Zionist Congress in Vienna in August 1925, the labor movement had formed close relationships with the liberal leftist branch of General Zionism and with the section of the Zionist leadership that was directly responsible for the Zionist enterprise. Zeev Sternhell in his book The Founding Myths of Israel: Nationalism, Socialism, and The Making of the Jewish State describes Labor's relationship with Arthur Ruppin, a Zionist historian and leader who, while advocating capitalist agriculture, refused to entrust market forces with the production of agricultural settlements.

Already in the 1920s the Labor movement disregarded its socialist roots and concentrated on building the nation by constructive action. According to Tzahor its leaders did not "abandon fundamental ideological principles". However, according to Ze'ev Sternhell in his book The Founding Myths of Israel, the labor leaders had already abandoned socialist principles by 1920 and only used them as "mobilizing myths".

The middle class allowed itself the freedom to stand aside and avoid involvement in the political life of the Yishuv and the Zionist movement. Because nationalist socialism in Palestine did not pose a threat to the private sector, the middle class never felt the need for a united political organization parallel with the Histradrut or for the formulation of an alternative to Labor's ideology.

In the 1930s, Jews living in the United States facing various assimilation issues and restrictions as well as widespread poverty in the general population, were influenced by Labor Zionism's socialist ideals. Jews in New York during the Great Depression were attracted to the socialism echoed in the liberalism of Roosevelt New deal. Beth Wenger, illustrates the reactions of Jewish women to the economic downturn, their contribution to the family economy, and the general tendency to adhere only to the style of a wage-working husband in the American middle class. Deborah Dash Moore describes in her book "At Home in America" how the generation influenced by such socialist ideals reconstructed Jewishness, molded it to suit the American middle-class model, adapted it to the rigors of urban life, imbued it with Jewish feelings learned from their immigrant parents, and added it to the Jewish history chain.

Labor Zionism provided the ideological underpinning for Israel’s labor parties. The Israel Labor Party and its predecessors led governing coalitions uninterruptedly from 1948, when the State of Israel was founded, to 1977.

Following the 1967 Six-Day War several prominent Labor Zionists created the Movement for Greater Israel which subscribed to an ideology of Greater Israel and called upon the Israeli government to keep and populate all areas captured in the war. Among the public figures in this movement associated with left-wing nationalism were Rachel Yanait Ben-Zvi, Yitzhak Tabenkin, Icchak Cukierman, Zivia Lubetkin, Eliezer Livneh, Moshe Shamir, Zev Vilnay, Shmuel Yosef Agnon, Isser Harel, Dan Tolkovsky, and Avraham Yoffe. In the 1969 Knesset elections it ran as the "List for the Land of Israel", but failed to cross the electoral threshold. Prior to the 1973 elections, it joined the Likud and won 39 seats. In 1976 it merged with the National List and the Independent Centre (a breakaway from the Free Centre) to form La'am, which remained a faction within Likud until its merger into the Herut faction in 1984.

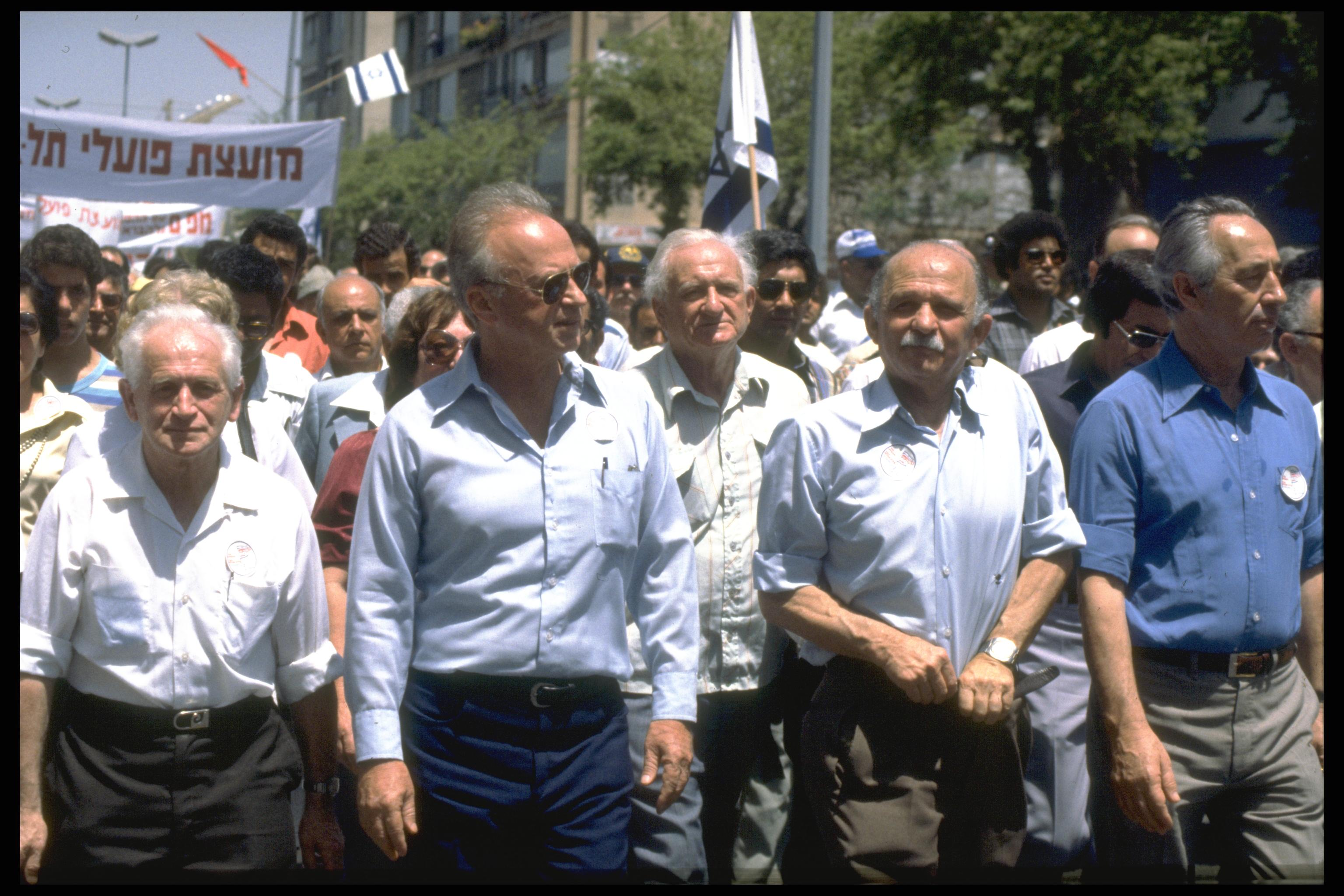
Alignment politicians Meir Talmi (Mapam faction), Yitzhak Rabin (Labour Party faction), Victor Shem-Tov (Mapam) and Shimon Peres (Labour Party) participate in the 1980 Histadrut May Day Parade in Tel Aviv

Other prominent Labor Zionists, especially those who came to dominate the Israeli Labor Party, became strong advocates for relinquishing the territory won during the Six-Day War. By the signing of the Oslo Accords in 1993, this became the central policy of the Labor Party under Prime Minister Yitzhak Rabin and Foreign Minister Shimon Peres. What distinguishes Labor Zionism from other Zionist streams today is not economic policy, an analysis of capitalism, or any class analysis or orientation, but its attitude towards the Israeli–Palestinian peace process with modern Labor Zionists tending to support the Israeli peace camp to varying degrees. This orientation towards Israel's borders and foreign policy has dominated Labor Zionist institutions in recent decades to the extent that socialist Zionists who support a Greater Israel ideology are forced to seek political expression elsewhere.

In Israel the Labor Party has followed the general path of other governing social-democratic parties such as the British Labour Party and is now fully oriented towards supporting a capitalist model, and some factions support centrist policies akin to the Third Way, though in the 2010s it has returned to a more social-democratic outlook under the leadership of Shelly Yachimovich and Amir Peretz.

== Today ==
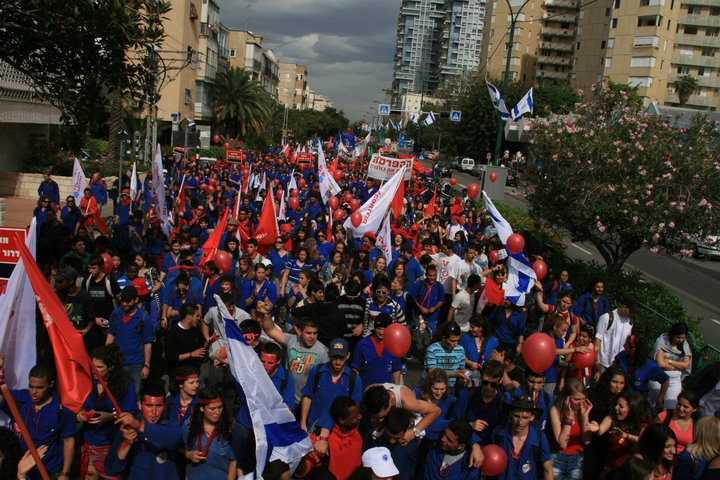
HaNoar HaOved VeHaLomed march in the May Day parade in Tel Aviv, 2011. 90 years of the Histadrut.

Labor Zionism manifests itself today in both adult and youth organizations. Among adults, the World Labor Zionist Movement, based in Jerusalem, has affiliates in countries around the world, such as Ameinu in the United States and Australia, Associação Moshé Sharett (Moshe Sharett Association) in Brazil and the Jewish Labour Movement in the United Kingdom. Youth and students are served through Zionist youth movements such as Habonim Dror, Hashomer Hatzair and college-age campus activist groups such as the Union of Progressive Zionists of the U.S. and Canada.

Shlomo Avineri, member of the last Labor government, Israeli political scientist, Professor of Political Science at the Hebrew University of Jerusalem who has written on Hegel and translated some of Marx's early writings, recognizes that Zionism is "the most fundamental revolution in Jewish life" and stresses the revolutionary aspect of Zionism. In The Making of Modern Zionism: The Intellectual Origins of the Jewish State, he believes it as a permanent revolution that aims for a radically different and more just society in Israel after creating a new normative and public focus for Jewish Existence. He is out to challenge Zionism's consensus view as a religiously inspired movement sparked by outbreaks of anti-Semitism and to create a rich, diverse intellectual lineage important to the movement today.

In Israel, Labor Zionism has become nearly synonymous with the Israeli peace camp. Usually, Labor Zionist political and educational institutions activists are also advocates of a two-state solution, who do not necessarily adhere to socialist economic views.

== See also ==
- Ameinu ("our people"), US successor to the Labor Zionist Alliance
- General Jewish Labour Bund (disambiguation), other Jewish labor movements
- Hashomer Hatzair, left-wing Zionist youth movement
- Hanoar Haoved Vehalomed, left-wing Israeli youth movement
- Habonim Dror, left-wing Zionist youth movement
- Havlagah ("The Restraint"), Haganah's policy of restraint towards Arab enemies
- Hebrew labor or "conquest of labor"
- Histadrut, Israel's national trade union center
- Jewish left, Jews who support left-wing causes
- Kibbutz, collective community in pre-state Palestine and the State of Israel
- Left-wing nationalism
- Movement for Greater Israel
- Partners for Progressive Israel
- Rome and Jerusalem (text at Wikisource), a classic 1862 work on Labor Zionism by Moses Hess
- The Founding Myths of Israel by Zeev Sternhell
- Secular Zionism
- Yidisher Kultur Farband, YKUF, a.k.a. Jewish Culture Association, Communist-oriented organization founded 1937
- Yidish Natsionaler Arbeter Farband, NJWA, a.k.a. Jewish National Workers Alliance, Labor Zionist-oriented American Jewish organization
- Types of Zionism
