= Emma Talmi =

Israeli politician (1905–2004)

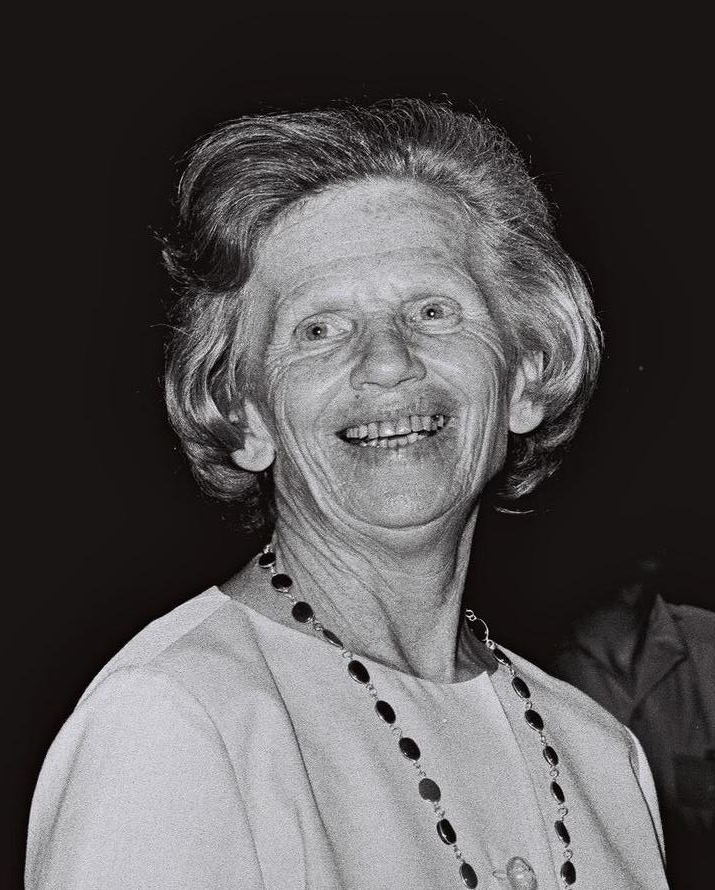
- Talmi in 1966

Faction represented in the Knesset
- 1955–1969: Mapam
- 1969: Alignment

Personal details
- Born: 25 April 1905 Warsaw, Russian Empire
- Died: 6 June 2004 (aged 99)

Emma Talmi (Hebrew: אמה תלמי, Yiddish: עמאַ טאַלמי, née Levine; 25 April 1905 – 6 June 2004) was an Israeli politician who served as a member of the Knesset for Mapam and the Alignment between 1955 and 1969.

== Biography ==
Born in Warsaw in the Russian Empire (now in Poland), Talmi joined Hashomer Hatzair at the age of 15, and in 1924, at the age of 19, emigrated to Mandatory Palestine on her own. She worked in agriculture, building and road paving, but was frequently unemployed and ill. She eventually found a job working at a Kindergarten near Haifa, living in a hut belonging to the Kindergarten.

In 1927 she joined kibbutz Mishmar HaEmek, where she worked as a kindergarten teacher. In 1931 she returned to Poland as a Hashomer Hatzair emissary, and met her future husband Meir. They later had three children, Yigal (1934), Yehuda (1940) and Binyamin (1946). She became a member of Kibbutz Artzi movement, working in its Department of Social Affairs. She also served as a member of the Assembly of Representatives.

A member of Mapam, she was elected to the Knesset on its list in 1955, and was re-elected in 1959, 1961, and 1965, after which she served as a Deputy Speaker. She lost her seat in the 1969 elections, shortly after Mapam had joined the Alignment alliance. Whilst a member of the Knesset, Talmi pushed for equal rights for women, education and the underprivileged in society, as well as against religious coercion. Her speaking talent led to her being dubbed the "Knesset Nightingale" by Menachem Begin. Her husband Meir was later a member of the Knesset for the Alignment and Mapam from 1974 until 1981.

She died in 2004 at the age of 99.
