= Ahdut HaAvoda =

Former political party in Israel

Ahdut HaAvoda אַחְדוּת הַעֲבוֹדָה
- Logo of Ahdut HaAvoda's third incarnation.
- Leader: Yitzhak Tabenkin; Yigal Allon
- Founded: March 1919 (Ahdut HaAvoda); 1944 (Ahdut HaAvoda Movement); 1954 (Ahdut HaAvoda – Poale Zion)
- Dissolved: 23 January 1968
- Split from: Poale Zion (1919); Mapai (1944); Mapam (1954)
- Merged into: Mapai (5 Jan 1930); Mapam (1948); Labor Party (1968)
- Newspaper: LaMerhav (Hebrew); Folksblatt (Yiddish)
- Ideology: Labor Zionism; Democratic socialism Left-wing nationalism (Note: A trend towards left-wing nationalism became clear from 1944, as Ahdut HaAvoda began to openly oppose a binational state and possible territorial concessions.); Social democracy
- Political position: Centre-left to left-wing
- Alliances: Alignment (1965–1968)
- Most MKs: 10 (1955–1959)
- Fewest MKs: 4 (1954–1955)

Election symbol

Ahdut HaAvoda (Hebrew: אַחְדוּת הַעֲבוֹדָה, lit. 'Labor Unity') was the name used by a series of political parties in Israel. The first incarnation of Ahdut HaAvoda was established during the period of British Mandate and led by David Ben-Gurion. In 1930 it merged with rival Hapoel Hatzair to form Mapai, the leading Labor Zionist party that led the creation of the State of Israel.

The second edition of Ahdut HaAvoda was created by Mapai dissenters in 1944, who were dissatisfied with Ben-Gurion's scepticism of the Soviet Union, and the potential idea of territorial compromise. It absorbed Poale Zion Left in 1946, and shortly before the 1948 Palestine war, merged with Hashomer Hatzair Workers Party to create the Marxist-Zionist Mapam.

Former Ahdut HaAvoda members' opinion on the Soviet Union soured, which caused them to leave Mapam and re-establish the party in 1954. For the 1965 elections, it formed a joint slate with Mapai called the Alignment, and in 1968, the Alignment's component parties merged to form the Israeli Labor Party.

== History ==
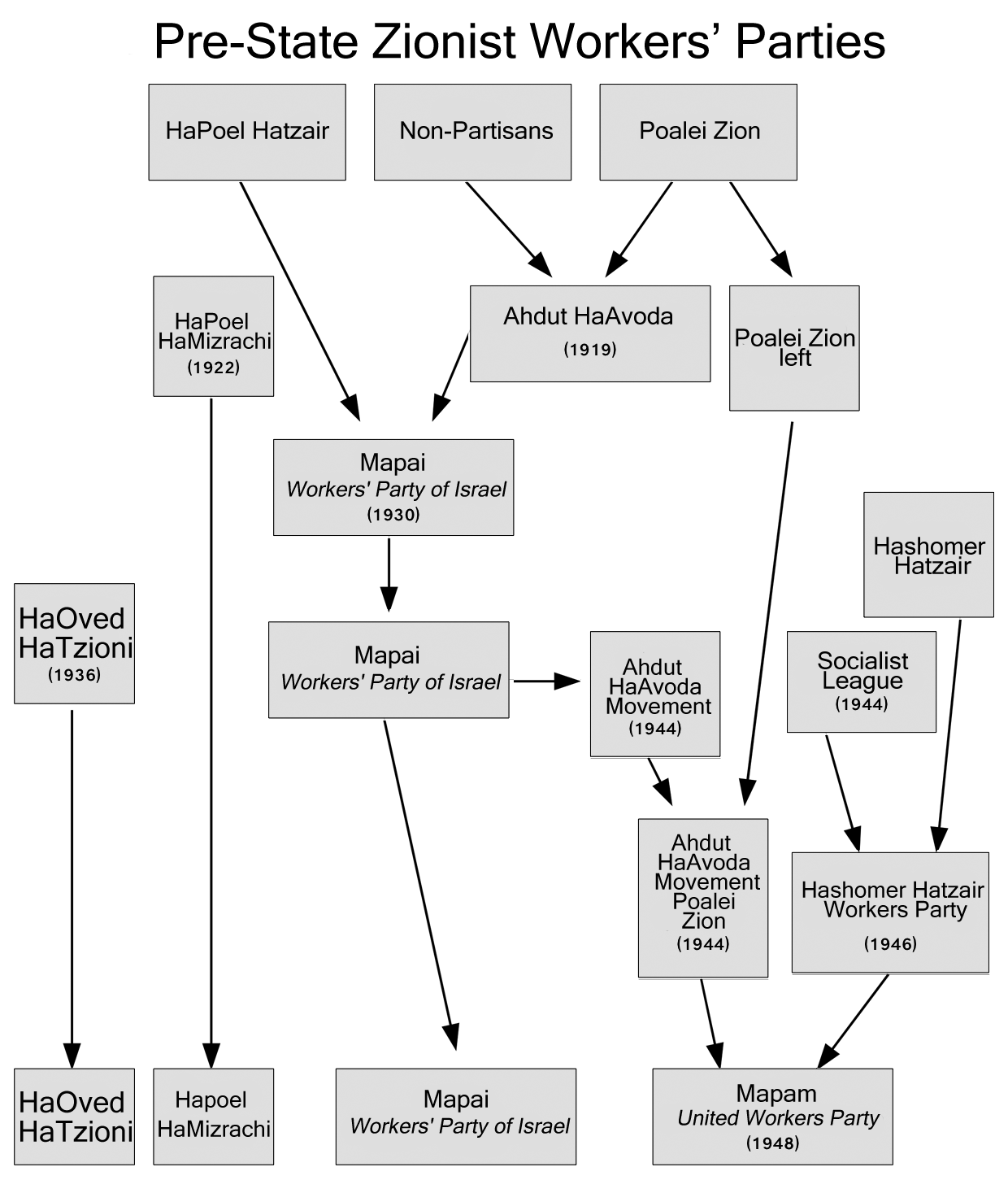
chart of zionist workers parties

=== Ahdut HaAvoda ===
The original Ahdut HaAvoda party was founded in Palestine in March 1919, while under British military administration, after a split in the Poale Zion party, which had established a branch in Ottoman Syria in 1906. Ahdut HaAvoda was led by David Ben-Gurion, who had been a member of the pre-war group. The root of the division was a conflict between membership of the Communist International and participation in the Zionist Organization (ZO). The membership of the more radical anti-ZO faction tended to come from among the newer Yiddish-speaking immigrants. The speaking of Yiddish became another area of disagreement with Ahdut HaAvoda having a Hebrew-only policy.

The following year, 1920, at a conference in June, the Ahdut HaAvoda decided to establish a military organisation, the Haganah, to replace the existing Hashomer militias.

The same year, Ahdut HaAvoda and the non-Marxist Hapoel Hatzair cooperated to set up the "General Organization of Hebrew Workers"—the Histadrut. In November delegates were elected by 4,500 members of the various labor groups and the first congress was held in Haifa, December 1920. Ahdut HaAvoda did not have an overall majority, but with the help of Hapoel Hatzair, they dominated proceedings. Their objective was the building of a separate Jewish workers economy in Greater Israel. Ben-Gurion was living in New York at the time, but returned in 1921 to be elected the first Secretary of the Histradrut. The Haganah was placed under Histadrut jurisdiction.

At the third Ahdut HaAvoda congress in 1924 at Ein Harod, Ben-Gurion defeated proposals put forward by Shlomo Kaplansky that a parliament be set up in Mandate Palestine. The issue had arisen due to the British Colonial Office having presented plans for the setting up of a Legislative Council.

Other important members of the first Ahdut HaAvoda were Yitzhak Ben-Zvi, and Berl Katznelson.

Cooperation between Ahdut HaAvoda and Hapoel Hatzair led them to merge in 1930 to form the "Party of the Workers of the Land of Israel"—Mapai, which was to become the dominant force in Zionist politics until the 1960s.

=== Ahdut HaAvoda Movement ===
On 20 May 1944 a group known as Faction B (Hebrew: סיעה ב׳, Sia'a Bet) split from Mapai adopting the Ahdut HaAvoda name from fourteen years earlier (Hebrew: התנועה לאחדות העבודה, HaTnu'a LeAhdut HaAvoda). This group was pro-Soviet, and rejected any territorial compromise. Many of its members came from HaKibbutz HaMeuhad, the Mapai kibbutz organization. They held a majority of the senior posts in the Haganah and in particular in the Palmach. Key leaders were Yisrael Galili and Yigal Allon. Others with close ties were David Elazar, Yitzhak Hofi, Avraham Adan and Yitzhak Rabin.

=== Ahdut HaAvoda Poale Zion Movement ===
In 1946 the Ahdut HaAvoda Movement merged with Poale Zion Left to form the Ahdut HaAvoda Poale Zion Movement (Hebrew: התנועה לאחדות העבודה פועלי ציון, HaTnu'a LeAhdut HaAvoda Poale Zion). Two years later the party merged with the Hashomer Hatzair Workers Party to form Mapam. Most senior Haganah commanders were Mapam members, including the head of the National Command Israel Galili who was one of Mapam's leaders. The Palmach was also dominated by Mapam with its commanding officer, Yigal Allon, and five brigade commanders being members. With the creation of Israel's national army this led to conflict with Ben Gurion. In 1953, after a series of confrontations, two of the four Area Command commanders and six of the twelve brigade commanders resigned. Those members of Mapam who remained, Yitzhak Rabin, Haim Bar-Lev and David Elazar, had to endure several years in staff or training post before resuming their careers.

The Ahdut HaAvoda members of Mapam were much more hawkish than the Hashomer Hatzair factions, refusing the idea of a binational state, and with some members supporting the Greater Israel idea.

=== Ahdut HaAvoda – Poale Zion ===
After an internal conflict in early 1952, two Ahdut HaAvoda-aligned MKs, Hannah Lamdan and David Livschitz, left to create the Independent Ahdut HaAvoda faction, later renamed the Ahdut HaAvoda Workers Party. Political analysts criticised Lamdan and Livschitz for forming a new party too early, and claiming that they would have attracted their entire former party if "they had waited longer". On 13 January 1954, the two joined Mapai.

On 23 August 1954 Moshe Aram, Yisrael Bar-Yehuda, Yitzhak Ben-Aharon and Aharon Zisling broke away from Mapam to re-establish Ahdut HaAvoda – Poale Zion. However, they were not recognised by the speaker of the Knesset as an independent party. The new party also launched a newspaper, LaMerhav, which became a daily publication in December that year, and was published until merging into Davar in May 1971.

The 1955 elections were fought as Ahdut HaAvoda and the party won 10 seats, making them the fifth largest in the Knesset. They formed part of both of Ben-Gurion's governing coalitions during the third Knesset. Party member Nahum Nir was appointed Knesset speaker (the only time a speaker has not been a member of the largest party), Bar-Yehuda was made Minister of Internal Affairs, and Moshe Carmel became Minister of Transportation. However, the party were ultimately responsible for bringing down the government in 1959 when they and fellow coalition partners Mapam voted against the government on the issue of selling arms to West Germany but refused to leave the coalition.

In the 1959 elections the party was reduced to seven seats. They again joined the coalition government until its collapse in 1961, with Ben-Aharon becoming Minister of Transportation. The 1961 elections saw them gain one seat, and become part of all three coalition governments of the fifth Knesset with Yigal Allon becoming Minister of Labour and Ben-Aharon, Bar-Yehuda and Carmel all acting as Minister of Transportation during the session.

For the 1965 elections, the party allied with Mapai to form the Labor Alignment, which won 45 seats. On 23 January 1968, the party merged with Mapai and Rafi to form the Israeli Labor Party and ceased to exist as an individual entity.

Among its hawkish security stances, the party was the strongest supporter of the attack on Syria in the Six-Day War.

== Leaders ==
Leader	Took office	Left office
David Ben-Gurion	1920	1930
Yitzhak Tabenkin	1944 (first time); 1955 (second time)	1949 (first time); 1959 (second time)
Yisrael Galili	1959	1965

== Election results ==
First Ahdut HaAvoda (1920–1930)
Election	Leader	Votes	%	Seats	+/–	Outcome
1920	David Ben-Gurion	N/A	N/A	70 / 314	▲70	coalition
1925	David Ben-Gurion	8,834	N/A	54 / 221	▼16	coalition

Second Ahdut HaAvoda (1944–1949)
Election	Leader	Votes	%	Seats	+/–	Outcome
1944	Yitzhak Tabenkin	17,928	9.04	16 / 173	▲16	coalition

Third Ahdut HaAvoda (1955–1968)
Election	Leader	Votes	%	Seats	+/–	Outcome
1955	Yitzhak Tabenkin	69,475	8.14	10 / 120	▲10	coalition
1959	Yisrael Galili	58,043	5.99	7 / 120	▼3	coalition
1961	Yisrael Galili	66,170	6.57	8 / 120	▲1	coalition
1965	Yisrael Galili	part of the Labor Alignment		8 / 120	0	coalition
