= Victor Shem-Tov =

Israeli politician (1915–2014)

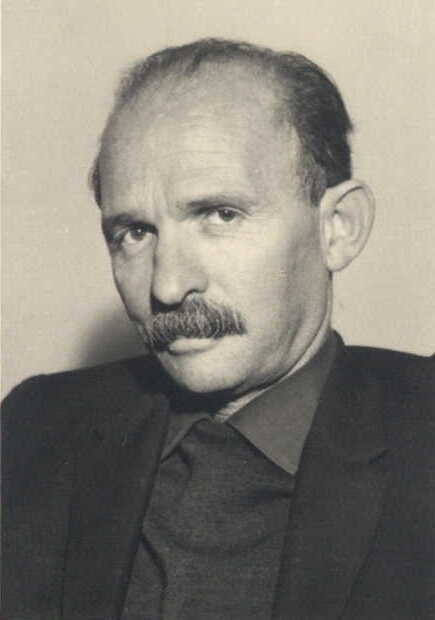
- Shem-Tov during his time in the Knesset

Leader of the Opposition
- De facto 22 October 1984 – 15 March 1988
- Prime Minister: Shimon Peres; Yitzhak Shamir
- Preceded by: Yuval Ne'eman
- Succeeded by: Yair Tzaban

Ministerial roles
- 1969–1970: Minister without Portfolio
- 1970–1977: Minister of Health
- 1974: Minister of Welfare

Faction represented in the Knesset
- 1961–1969: Mapam
- 1969: Alignment
- 1981–1984: Alignment
- 1984–1988: Mapam

Personal details
- Born: 1 February 1915 Samokov, Bulgaria
- Died: 8 March 2014 (aged 99) Jerusalem, Israel

Victor Shem-Tov (Bulgarian: Виктор Шемтов; Hebrew: ויקטור שם-טוב; 1 February 1915 – 8 March 2014) was an Israeli politician who held several ministerial portfolios in the late 1960s and 1970s.

== Biography ==
Born in Bulgaria to a family of Samokov goldsmiths, Shem-Tov mostly lived in the capital Sofia and was a member of the Maccabi youth movement. He emigrated to Mandatory Palestine in 1939, the same year in which he joined Hashomer Hatzair. He became a member of the Jerusalem Workers' Council in 1946, and was chairman of the Bulgarian Immigrants Association between 1949 and 1950.

In 1961 he served on the Histadrut's actions committee. In the same year he was elected to the Knesset on Mapam's list. He retained his seat in the 1965 elections, and was also voted onto Jerusalem's City Council. During the Knesset term Mapam joined the Alignment alliance.

Despite losing his seat in the 1969 elections, Shem-Tov was appointed Minister without Portfolio in Golda Meir's government in December 1969. In July 1970 he became Minister of Health. He also failed to win a seat in the 1973 elections, but retained his place in the cabinet. When Yitzhak Rabin formed a new government in June 1974 following Meir's resignation, he was also appointed Minister of Welfare, though he held the post only until October that year.

After Likud won the 1977 elections, Shem-Tov lost his place in the cabinet, and also failed to win a Knesset seat. However, he did win a seat in the 1981 elections, voted back into the Knesset on the Alignment's list. After he was re-elected in 1984, Mapam broke away from the Alignment to sit as an independent party. Shem-Tov resigned from the Knesset on 15 March 1988, and was replaced by Gadi Yatziv. In 1988 he received the prize "Archivio Disarmo - Golden Doves for Peace".

Shem-Tov died on 8 March 2014 in Jerusalem, aged 99.
