= Mapam =

Mapam מפ״ם
- Mapam's final logo, used from 1987 to 1997
- Leader: Yitzhak Tabenkin (first); Haim Oron (last)
- Founded: January 1948
- Dissolved: 1997
- Merger of: Hashomer Hatzair Workers Party; Ahdut HaAvoda Poale Zion Movement
- Merged into: Meretz
- Headquarters: Tel Aviv
- Newspaper: Al HaMishmar (Hebrew); Al-Mirsad (Arabic); Israel Shtime (Yiddish)
- Youth wing: Hashomer Hatzair; Young Mapam
- Ideology: Labor Zionism; Socialism (Israeli); 1948–1956: Marxism–Leninism; Marxism (Borochovism); 1956–1969: Scientific socialism Marxism (Borochovism); 1969–1997: Democratic socialism
- Political position: 1948–1969: Left-wing to far-left 1969–1997: Left-wing
- International affiliation: Socialist International (1983–1997)
- Alliance: Alignment (1969–1984); Meretz (1992–1997)
- Slogan: הפעם מפם ("This time, Mapam")
- Most MKs: 20 (1949–1951)
- Fewest MKs: 3 (1988–1992; 1996–1997)

Election symbol
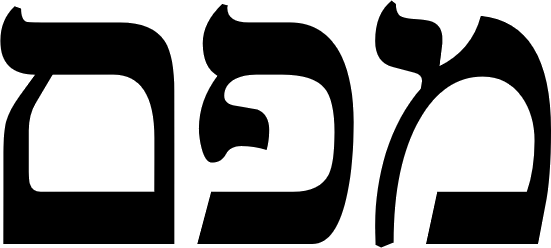
- (1949–1965), (1988)

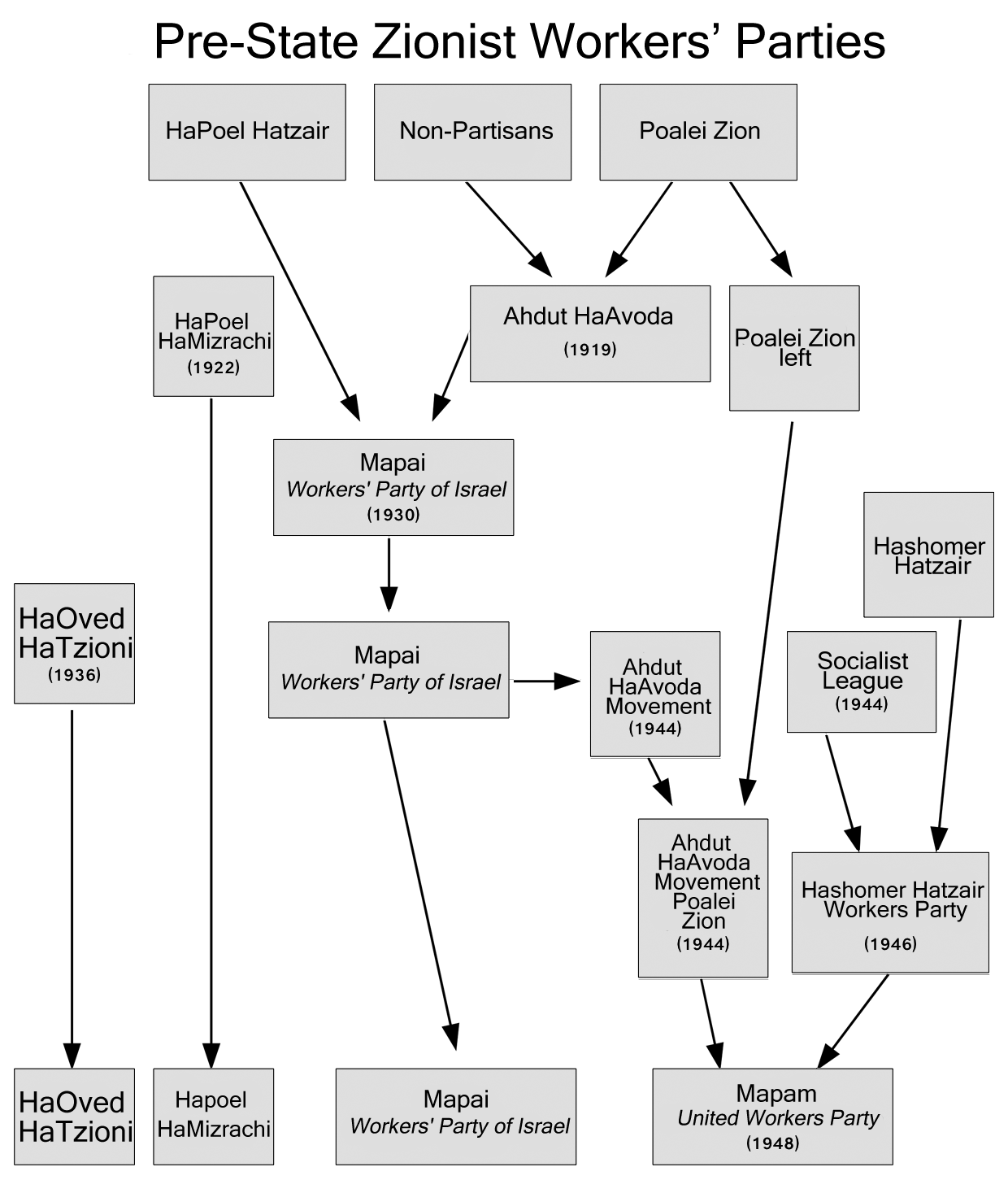
chart of zionist workers parties

Historic logo of Mapam, 1948–1987

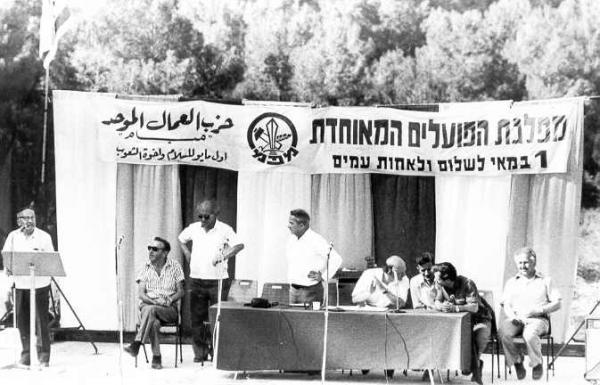
1950s Mapam May Day meeting. Slogan reads '1 of May for Peace and Brotherhood of the Peoples.

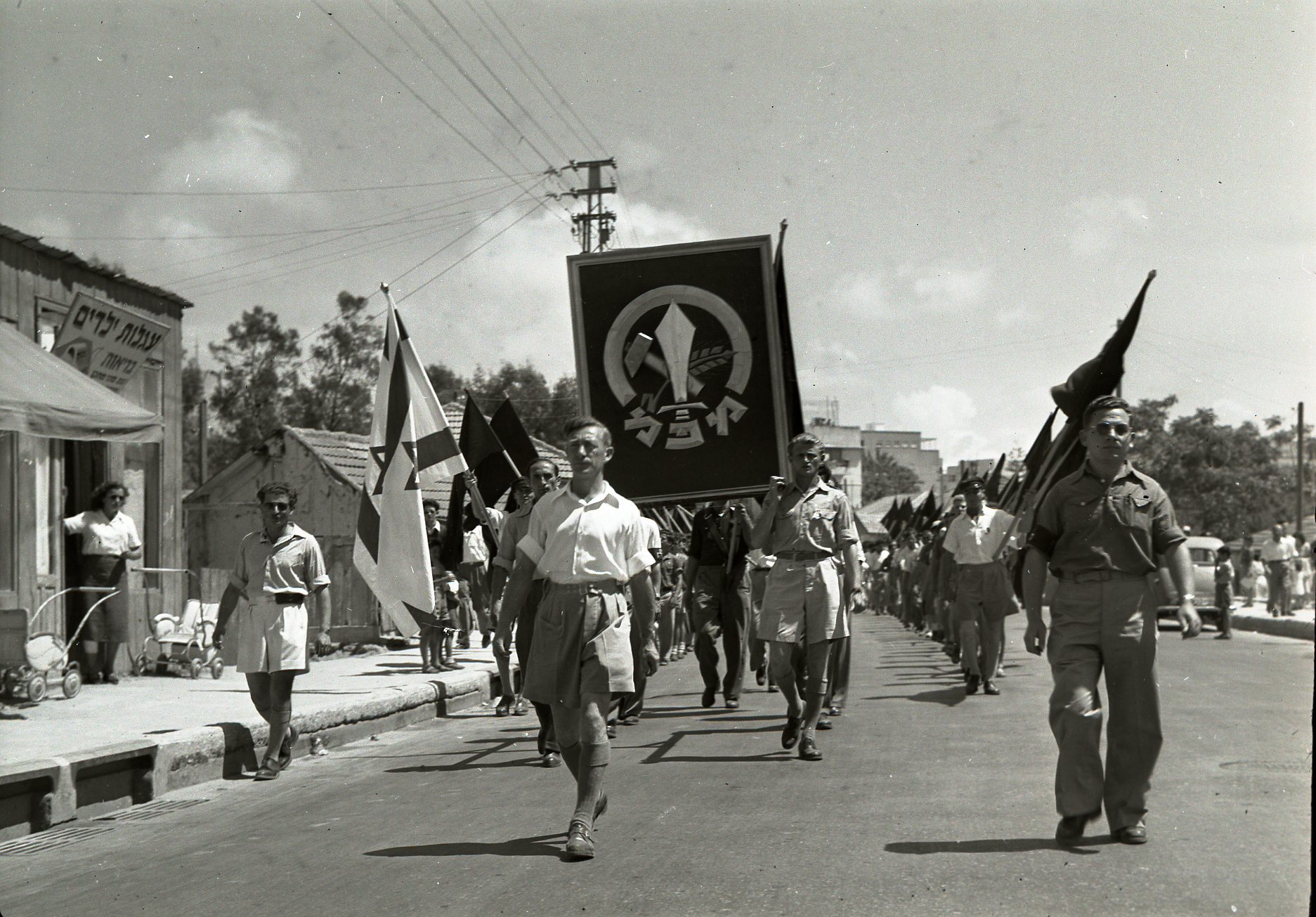
Mapam members at the May Day parade in 1950

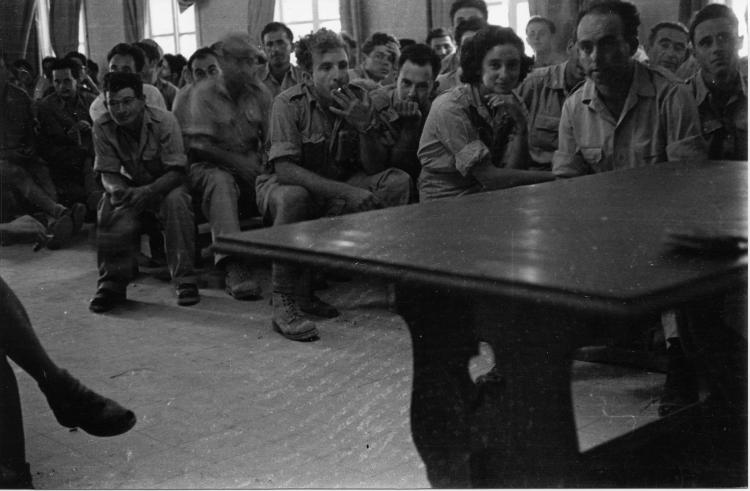
Mapam conference at Kibbutz Givat Brenner in November 1948

Mapam (Note: The party's name (Hebrew: מַפָּ״ם) is a Hebrew abbreviation for Mifleget HaPoalim HaMeuhedet (מִפְלֶגֶת הַפּוֹעֲלִים הַמְּאוּחֶדֶת) lit. 'United Workers Party') was a Labor Zionist and democratic socialist political party in the State of Israel. Established shortly before Israeli independence in January 1948 as a merger between the Hashomer Hatzair Workers Party, the Socialist League, and the Ahdut HaAvoda Poale Zion movement, it initially represented a Marxist form of Labor Zionism and was distinctive because of its critical support for the Soviet Union. It was once the second largest political force in Israel, drawing support from both the kibbutz and the urban working class movements, and initially benefited from popularity among the military elite.

Due to growing geopolitical tensions with the USSR in the 1950s and 1960s, the party suffered multiple splits and distanced itself from the Eastern Bloc, joining the Labor Party's Alignment in 1969, abandoning its earlier positions and moving towards democratic socialism.

Mapam left the Alignment in 1984, when the Labor Party joined a national unity government with the right-wing Likud. It moved to a more peaceful stance on the Israeli–Palestinian conflict, supporting a two-state solution with the creation of an independent Palestinian state.

Following a poor showing in the 1988 elections, and the perceived need for a united left-wing Zionist party, it merged with the Ratz and Shinui parties to form the social-democratic Meretz in 1992, with Mapam dissolving altogether in 1997.

== History ==
=== Foundation ===
Mapam was established in January 1948 by the merger of the kibbutz-based Hashomer Hatzair Workers Party, the non-kibbutz-based Socialist League, and the Ahdut HaAvoda Poale Zion Movement. The party's orientation was more Marxist and left-wing than that of the larger Mapai party, and it was closely associated with the Kibbutz Artzi Federation of the Hashomer Hatzair movement. It also continued a Hashomer Hatzair-affiliated publication as the Al HaMishmar newspaper. From 1951 to 1979, the party also published Al-Mirsad ("Observation Post"), an Arabic-language newspaper similar in name to its Hebrew counterpart. It also published the Yiddish-language Yisroel Shtimme Israel Shtime from 1956 to late in 1997.

The new party was part of the 1948 provisional government with a policy toward Arabs that differed from that of Prime Minister David Ben-Gurion. Its executive committee promoted Jewish–Arab coexistence, opposed the expulsion of civilians and supported the Palestinian right of return after the Nakba. Aharon Cohen, head of the party's Arab Affairs Department, authored the policy statement "Our Policy Towards Arabs During the War" in June 1948, emphasising these principles. The party opposed the destruction of Arab villages and cabinet member Aharon Zisling raised related concerns in government meetings. Ben-Gurion criticised Mapam's stance, citing the Battle of Mishmar HaEmek and saying: "They faced a cruel reality ... [and] saw that there was [only] one way and that was to expel the Arab villagers and burn the villages. And they did this, and they were the first to do this."

Mapam initially opposed establishing settlements on depopulated Arab land, though this conflicted with the settlement activities of Kibbutz Artzi, which was ideologically aligned with the party. Of 12 new settlements created during May and June 1948, six were Mapam-related groups. In August 1948, proposals were put forward for the creation of 32 new settlements, 27 of which were beyond the proposed United Nations partition line. A compromise policy was adopted, allowing new settlements on the condition that "surplus land" would remain for the possible return of displaced Arabs. Over time, the party shifted its stance the right of return, eventually supporting restrictions tied to the end of hostilities and to individuals deemed "peace-minded". With the explosion of opposition to the Government's proposal to the United Nations in July 1949 that 100,000 Palestinians might be allowed to return, the issue of return quietly dropped.

The gulf between policy makers in the executive and Mapam members who dominated the leadership of the armed forces was revealed following the military operations in the autumn of 1948. In early November the editor of Al HaMishmar, Eliezer Pra'i, received a letter describing events at al-Dawayima. There followed a meeting of the Political Committee on 11 November 1948, which was briefed by recently ousted Chief of Staff of the Haganah, Yisrael Galili, about the killing of civilians during Operations Yoav and Hiram. Cohen led a call for an independent inquiry. The problem for Mapam was that the commanders of these operations were senior Mapam members Yitzhak Sadeh and Moshe Carmel. It was agreed to accept Ben-Gurion's internal inquiry. In December 1948 party co-leader Meir Ya'ari publicly criticised the Israel Defense Forces for using the expulsion of civilians as an "imperative of strategy". This was probably directed at Mapam member Yigal Allon, who had been chief of operations during Operation Danny.

In the 1949 Constituent Assembly elections, Mapam won 19 seats, becoming the second-largest party in the Knesset after Mapai. At the time Mapam did not permit non-Jews to become members and instead sponsored an Arab satellite list, the Popular Arab Bloc, which failed to pass the 1% electoral threshold. Although Mapam held coalition talks with Ben-Gurion, it was excluded from the first government.

In the years following Israel's independence, Mapam benefitted from having comprised the majority of the Palmach, the elite forces of the Haganah during the 1948 Palestine war.

During the first Knesset, Mapam gained an additional seat when Eliezer Preminger joined after leaving Maki and then setting up his own party, the Hebrew Communists.

In the 1951 elections Mapam was reduced to 15 seats. That Knesset included Rostam Bastuni, the first Arab to represent a Zionist party.

=== Internal crises ===
In February 1952, David Livschitz, who joined through Ahdut HaAvoda, was expelled from Mapam due to a controversy with the Hashomer Hatzair faction. His ally, fellow ex-Ahdut HaAvoda member Hannah Lamdan, also resigned from the party. They formed the Independent Ahdut HaAvoda faction. After a brief period of trying to form a party, it was absorbed by Mapai in early 1954.

The 1952 Slánský trial severely shook the party's faith in the Soviet Union. The show trials, in which mostly Jewish leaders of the Communist Party of Czechoslovakia were purged, falsely implicated Mapam's envoy in Prague, Mordechai Oren, as part of a Zionist conspiracy.

The ideological shift led to several splits. On 26 December 1952, Mapam's Council convened to vote on motions where the far-left of the party found themselves in the minority. Adolf Berman, Ya'akov Riftin and Moshe Sneh were dismissed from their positions of power in the party, which they unsuccessfully appealed the decision, after which Berman and Sneh accused Mapam of being controlled by 'Mapai agents for the benefit and enjoyment of the bourgeoisie'. On 28 January 1953, Mapam voted to expel Berman, Sneh and Bastuni for their 'fundamental opposition to the socialist Zionist principles' of the party, for trying to 'undermine the party's institutions' and for supporting the ruling of the Prague Trials. On 2 February, the three defectors formed the Left Faction, quickly renamed as the Left Socialist Party. It proclaimed that relations with the USSR were more important than the continuation of the Zionist project, and Sneh himself stated he had moved on from Zionism towards communism. Bastuni returned to Mapam a month after the new party was formed while the Left Socialist Party merged into Maki in 1954.

Afterwards, the former Ahdut HaAvoda reformed and left Mapam, taking four MKs with them, though the Knesset speaker did not recognize the group as an independent party during the Knesset session. This also displeased the USSR. By the end of the second Knesset, Mapam's strength had dropped to seven seats. The party won nine seats in the 1955 elections and having distanced itself from the Soviet Union, joined Ben-Gurion's coalition governments.

Following these events and Nikita Khrushchev's 1956 speech On the Cult of Personality and Its Consequences, Mapam ceased to support the USSR, and it began to moderate its Marxist-Zionist policies toward democratic socialism.

In 1959 Mapam and Ahdut HaAvoda voted against the government's decision to sell arms to West Germany, collapsing the government and leading to Ben-Gurion's brief resignation.

In the 1959 elections the party retained its nine seats, and despite their previous differences, were included in Ben-Gurion's coalition. In the 1961 elections it again won nine seats, but this time was not part of the governing coalition. The 1965 elections saw Mapam lose a seat, dropping to eight mandates, but enter the coalition government.

=== Alignment ===
In 1969 Mapam entered into an alliance with the Israeli Labor Party, forming the Alignment, which won 56 of 120 Knesset seats in the 1969 elections, the highest total ever achieved by a single electoral list. At the time, Soviet commentators called Mapam "one of the most reactionary ones among the left-socialist parties".

By the 1970s, some former left-wing Mapam members, including Walid Haj Yahia, Yair Tzaban, Gadi Yatziv, associated themselves with the dovish left-wing, and were founding members of the Left Camp of Israel (Sheli) in 1977, which was pitted against Mapam by its own members as well as political commentators. Sheli chairman Meir Pa'il accused Mapam of 'riding' the increasingly moderate Alignment in order to not 'struggle' in elections. Sheli quickly began to disintegrate due to factional struggles and the Lebanon War, with Haj Yahia, Tzaban and Yatziv returning to Mapam.

Mapam briefly broke away from the Alignment during the eighth Knesset (following the 1973 Israeli legislative election), but returned shortly afterward. Mapam cemented its democratic socialist turn by joining the Socialist International in 1983.

The party then remained part of the Alignment until after the 1984 elections, when it broke away due to anger over Shimon Peres's decision to form a national unity government with Likud, and began to support a two-state solution. Mapam left the Alignment with six MKs, but in July 1988, this was reduced to five when Muhammed Wattad defected to Hadash, as he was unsatisfied with Mapam's lack of Arab representation.

=== Decline and merger ===
In their last ever solo campaign, for the 1988 election, Mapam campaigned on the increasing cost of housing, on the economic crisis that the Alignment presided over, and the urgent need for a peace deal. Before the campaigns, talks to form a Mapam-Ratz joint list failed. When Ratz signed a surplus vote agreement with the Alignment, Shem-Tov accused them of wanting to "remove Mapam from the political scene", to which Ratz leader Shulamit Aloni responded by saying that "Mapam's panic is understandable. It is a spoiled party, rich in assets and jobs, which fears any young, fresh organization without vested economic interests that comes to fight with clean hands." She also highlighted the inevitability of the two parties becoming allies, comparing Mapam to the biblical character Saul throwing his spear at David.

Despite Mapam's perceived organisational advantage as a veteran party, opinion polls in the weeks preceding the election predicted them only winning two seats, while Ratz ascended in the polls, with a maximum prediction of eight seats.

In the election, Mapam won 2.5% of the vote and 3 seats, with Amira Sartani and Gadi Yatziv losing their seats. Although Mapam had won one more seat than expected in the polls, this was its worst ever finish. Due to the First Intifada overshadowing the election, it was thought that many left-wing voters flocked to Ratz, who clearly outlined their support for full withdrawal from the West Bank and Gaza Strip, a policy area that Mapam failed to establish a clear opinion on

Mapam had contemplated a merger with other left-wing forces, namely Ratz, as early as 1985. During the 1989 local elections, Mapam, Ratz and the liberal Shinui collaborated, forming joint lists in some localities. In 1992, the election threshold was raised to 1.5%, a number which Mapam had already struggled to reach in 1988. To avoid elimination in that year's election, Mapam, Ratz and Shinui (who were also dangerously close to the new threshold) formed the nationwide Meretz alliance. While Mapam's socialism was at odds with Shinui's economic liberalism and upper-middle class appeal, the three parties united because of their similar views on the peace process and secularism. Although the leaders of all three constituent parties were the focus in Meretz's campaign, Ratz's Shulamit Aloni became the leader of the new alliance. Furthermore, Meretz did not inherit the anti-capitalist politics of Mapam.

Meretz became the third-largest Knesset party in the 1992 elections and was admitted into Yitzhak Rabin's government. Four Mapam members were elected into the Knesset, with Yair Tzaban becoming Minister of Immigrant Absorption. Al HaMishmar ceased publication in 1995, and in 1997 Mapam formally merged into Meretz along with Ratz and part of Shinui, ceasing to exist as an independent political organization.

== Ideology ==
From its founding, Mapam identified itself with Labor Zionist principles. In its first years, the party identified closely with Joseph Stalin's leadership of the Soviet Union, and principles of Marxism–Leninism. The party advocated for the purge of capitalists and the establishment a worker-led state.

The Hashomer Hatzair faction identified with the Eastern Bloc more readily than the Ahdut HaAvoda-Poale Zion Left faction. Furthermore, Hashomer Hatzair supported territorial concessions to Arabs or including them in a bi-national state, while the Ahdut HaAvoda faction, especially Tabenkin himself, supported the idea of Greater Israel.

After the departure of Ahdut HaAvoda-Poale Zion Left, Mapam continued to identify with Borochovist Marxism, and to advocate for an Israeli 'road to socialism'. The party adopted a stance of neutralism in the Cold War. However, following the Six-Day War and the Soviet Union's perceived support for the Arab countries, Mapam began to oppose the USSR.

While in the Alignment, Mapam continued to criticise social democracy for retaining a capitalist class. It also condemned the authoritarian nature of communist-led countries. The party continued to advocate for a socialist society based on equality, self-management and solidarity, with a democratically planned economy. The party advocated support for the Jordanian annexation of the West Bank to create a joint Jordanian-Palestinian state to co-exist with an Israeli state along the Green Line.

In 1983, Mapam joined the Socialist International, an organisation dominated by social democratic parties. After leaving the Alignment, Mapam described itself as a joint Jewish-Arab 'democratic socialist' party. Furthermore, the party positioned itself within the peace camp, supporting negotiations with the Palestine Liberation Organization. Many members hoped for a resulting two-state solution, although this was not concrete party policy at the time of the 1988 election.

Throughout Mapam's existence, it claimed to embody the kibbutz values of self-management and voluntarism.

== Leaders ==
Leader	Took office	Left office
Yitzhak Tabenkin	1949	1951
Meir Ya'ari	1951	1974
Meir Talmi	1974	1981
Victor Shem-Tov	1981	1988
Yair Tzaban	1988	1996
Haim Oron	1996	1997

== Election results ==
Election	Leader	Votes	%	Seats	+/–	Status
1949	Yitzhak Tabenkin	64,018	14.7 (#2)	19 / 120	New	Opposition
1951	Meir Ya'ari	86,095	12.5 (#3)	15 / 120	▼4	Opposition
1955	Meir Ya'ari	62,401	7.3 (#6)	9 / 120	▼3	Government
1959	Meir Ya'ari	69,468	7.2 (#4)	9 / 120	0	Government
1961	Meir Ya'ari	75,654	7.5 (#5)	9 / 120	0	Opposition
1965	Meir Ya'ari	79,985	6.6 (#5)	8 / 120	▼1	Government
1969	Meir Ya'ari	Part of Alignment		7 / 120	▼1	Government
1973	Meir Talmi	Part of Alignment		7 / 120	0	Government
1977	Meir Talmi	Part of Alignment		4 / 120	▼3	Opposition
1981	Victor Shem-Tov	Part of Alignment		7 / 120	▲3	Opposition
1984	Victor Shem-Tov	Part of Alignment		6 / 120	▼1	Opposition
1988	Yair Tzaban	56,345	2.5 (#9)	3 / 120	▼3	Opposition
1992	Yair Tzaban	Part of Meretz		4 / 120	▲1	Government
1996	Haim Oron	Part of Meretz		3 / 120	▼1	Opposition

== Knesset members ==
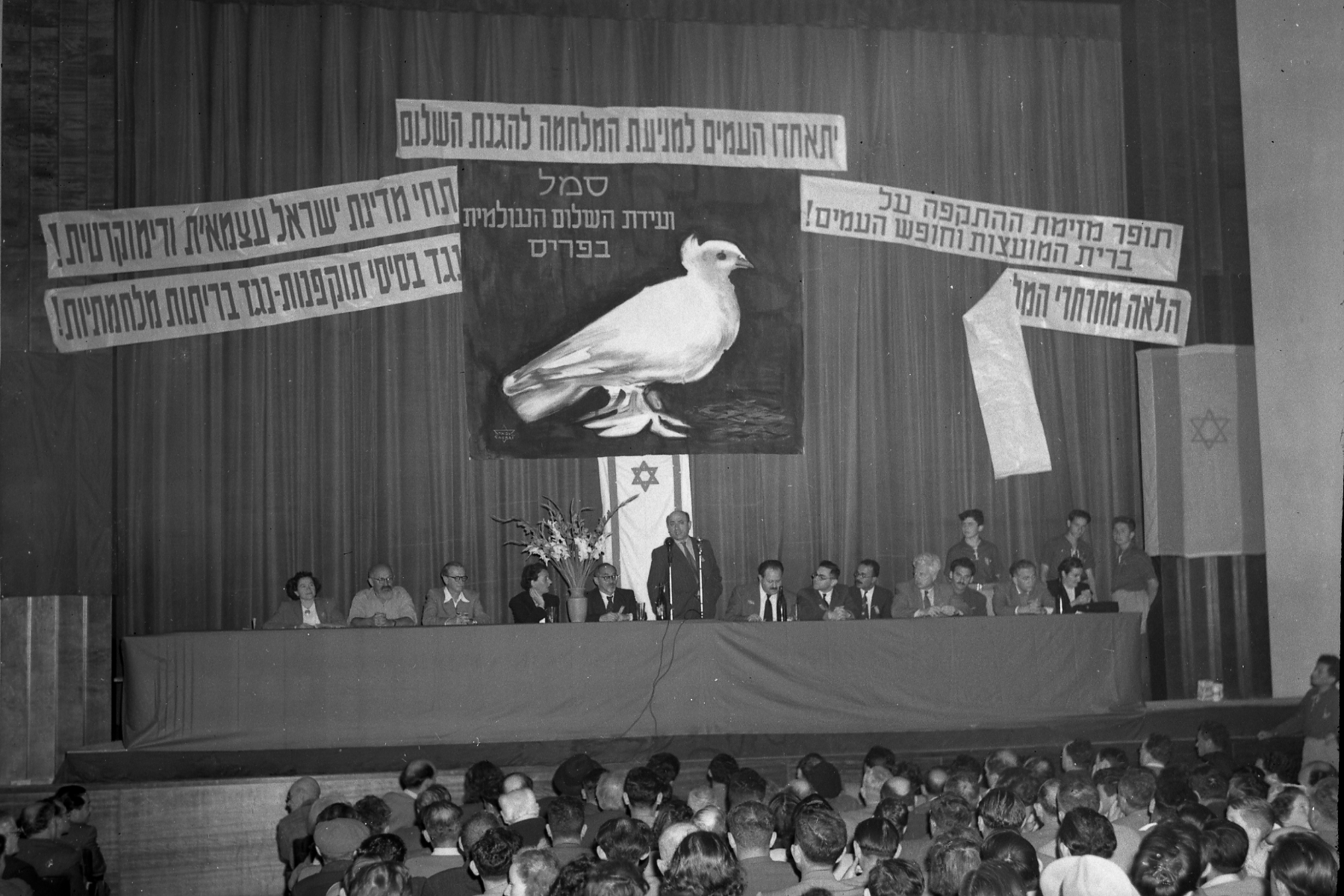
Mapam conference in 1949

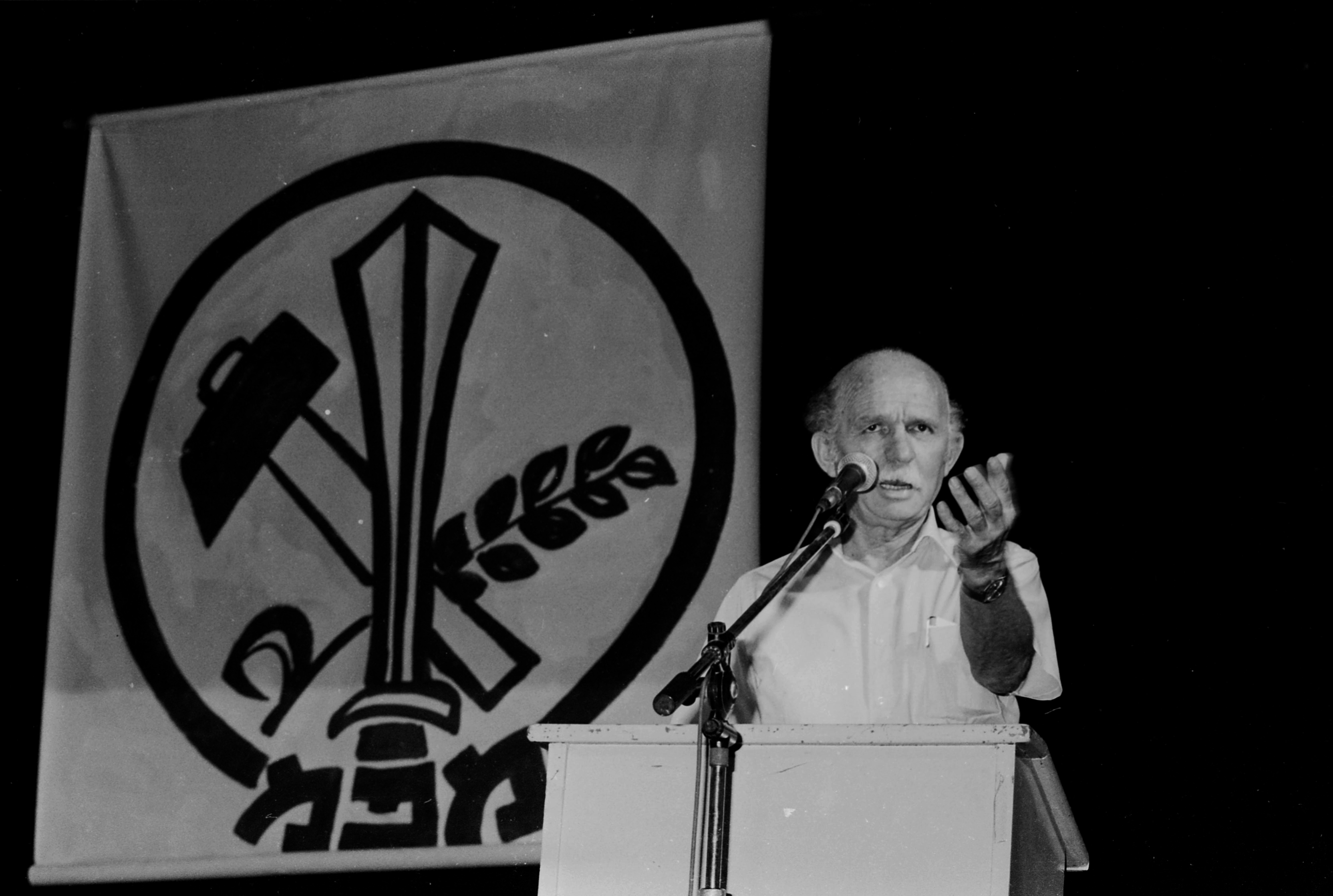
Leader Victor Shem-Tov speaks at a party meeting in 1984 where it was decided to leave the Alignment.

Knesset (MKs out of 120) (popular vote)	Knesset Members
1 (1949–1951) (19) (14.7%)	Moshe Aram, Menachem Bader, Dov Bar-Nir (replaced by Menachem Ratzon on 10 April 1951), Yisrael Bar-Yehuda, Yitzhak Ben-Aharon, Mordechai Bentov, Yisrael Galili, Ya'akov Hazan, Fayge Ilanit, Hannah Lamdan, Nahum Nir, Eliezer Peri, Berl Repetur, Ya'akov Riftin, Hanan Rubin, Moshe Sneh, Yitzhak Tabankin (replaced by David Livschitz on 12 April 1951), Meir Ya'ari, Aharon Zisling, Eliezer Preminger (joined from the Hebrew Communists on 15 August 1949)
2 (1951–1955) (15) (12.5%)	Rostam Bastuni, Mordechai Bentov, Ya'akov Hazan, Eliezer Peri, Ya'akov Riftin, Hanan Rubin, Meir Ya'ari, Moshe Aram, (Note: Left party to establish Ahdut HaAvoda on 23 October 1954) Yisrael Bar-Yehuda, Yitzhak Ben-Aharon, Aharon Zisling, Avraham Berman, (Note: Left party to establish the Left Faction on 20 February 1952) Moshe Sneh, Hannah Lamdan, (Note: Left party to establish the Faction independent of Ahdut HaAvoda on 20 January 1953, before joining Mapai on 13 January 1954.) David Livschitz
3 (1955–1959) (9) (7.3%)	Yisrael Barzilai, Mordechai Bentov, Ya'akov Hazan, Ya'akov Riftin, Hanan Rubin, Emma Talmi, Meir Ya'ari, Haim Yehuda, Yitzhak Yitzhaky (replaced by Yussuf Hamis on 21 September 1955)
4 (1959–1961) (9) (7.2%)	Yisrael Barzilai, Mordechai Bentov, Yussuf Hamis, Ya'akov Hazan, Ya'akov Riftin, Hanan Rubin, Emma Talmi, Meir Ya'ari, Haim Yehuda (replaced by Yosef Kushnir on 10 July 1960)
5 (1961–1965) (9) (7.5%)	Yisrael Barzilai, Mordechai Bentov, Yussuf Hamis, Ya'akov Hazan, Ya'akov Riftin, Hanan Rubin (replaced by Yosef Kushnir), Victor Shem-Tov, Emma Talmi, Meir Ya'ari
6 (1965–1969) (8) (6.6%)	Reuven Arazi, Ya'akov Hazan, Natan Peled, Shlomo Rosen, Victor Shem-Tov, Emma Talmi, Meir Yaari, Abd el-Aziz el-Zoubi (all merged into the Alignment)
7 (1969–1974) (6) (part of Alignment)	Reuven Arazi, Haika Grossman, Abd el-Aziz el-Zoubi, Dov Zakin, Ya'akov Hazan, Meir Ya'ari, Shlomo Rosen
8 (1973–1977) (6) (part of Alignment)	Yehuda Dranitzki, Aharon Efrat, Haika Grossman, Eliezer Ronen, Meir Talmi, Dov Zakin, Abd el-Aziz el-Zoubi (replaced by Haviv Shimoni of the Labor Party on 14 February 1974)
9 (1977–1981) (4) (part of Alignment)	Haika Grossman, Moshe Amar, Naftali Feder, Meir Talmi, Emri Ron (replaced Haim Yosef Zadok of the Labor Party on 2 January 1978)
10 (1981–1984) (7) (part of Alignment)	Elazar Granot, Muhammed Wattad, Dov Zakin, Naftali Feder, Yair Tzaban, Emri Ron, Victor Shem-Tov
11 (1984–1988) (6) (part of Alignment)	Elazar Granot, Haika Grossman, Amira Sartani, Victor Shem-Tov (replaced by Gadi Yatziv on 15 March 1988), Yair Tzaban, Muhammed Wattad (left to join Hadash on 12 July 1988)
12 (1988–1992) (3) (2.5%)	Hussein Faris, Haim Oron, Yair Tzaban
13 (1992–1996) (4) (part of Meretz)	Haim Oron, Walid Haj Yahia, Yair Tzaban, Anat Maor
14 (1996–1997) (3) (part of Meretz)	Haim Oron, Walid Haj Yahia, Anat Maor (all merged into Meretz)

== See also ==
- Labor Zionism
- Hashomer Hatzair movement
