= Socialist League of Palestine =

Socialist League of Palestine הליגה הסוציאליסטית של פלשתינה
- Founded: 1936
- Merged into: Hashomer Hatzair Workers Party
- Ideology: Socialism; Labor Zionism
- Political position: Left wing

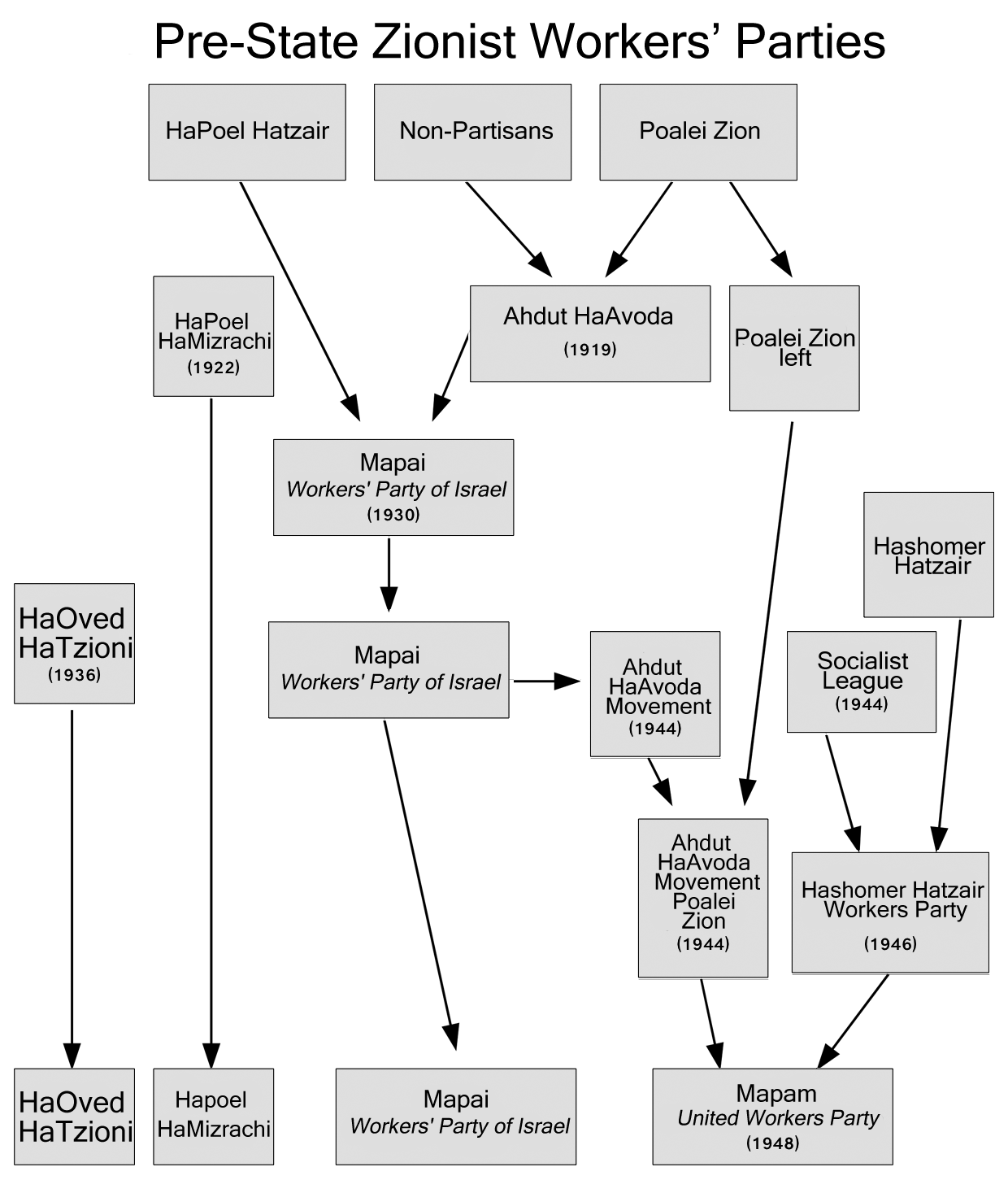
chart of zionist workers parties

The Socialist League of Palestine was a political organization in Mandate Palestine. Established in 1936, it was connected to the left-Zionist Hashomer Hatzair movement. The Socialist League functioned as the urban ally of the Kibbutz Artzi movement. In 1946, the Socialist League and Kibbutz Artzi movement founded the Hashomer Hatzair Workers Party (one of the fore-runners of MAPAM, itself a forerunner of Meretz in turn).
