= Meir Talmi =

Israeli politician (1909–1994)

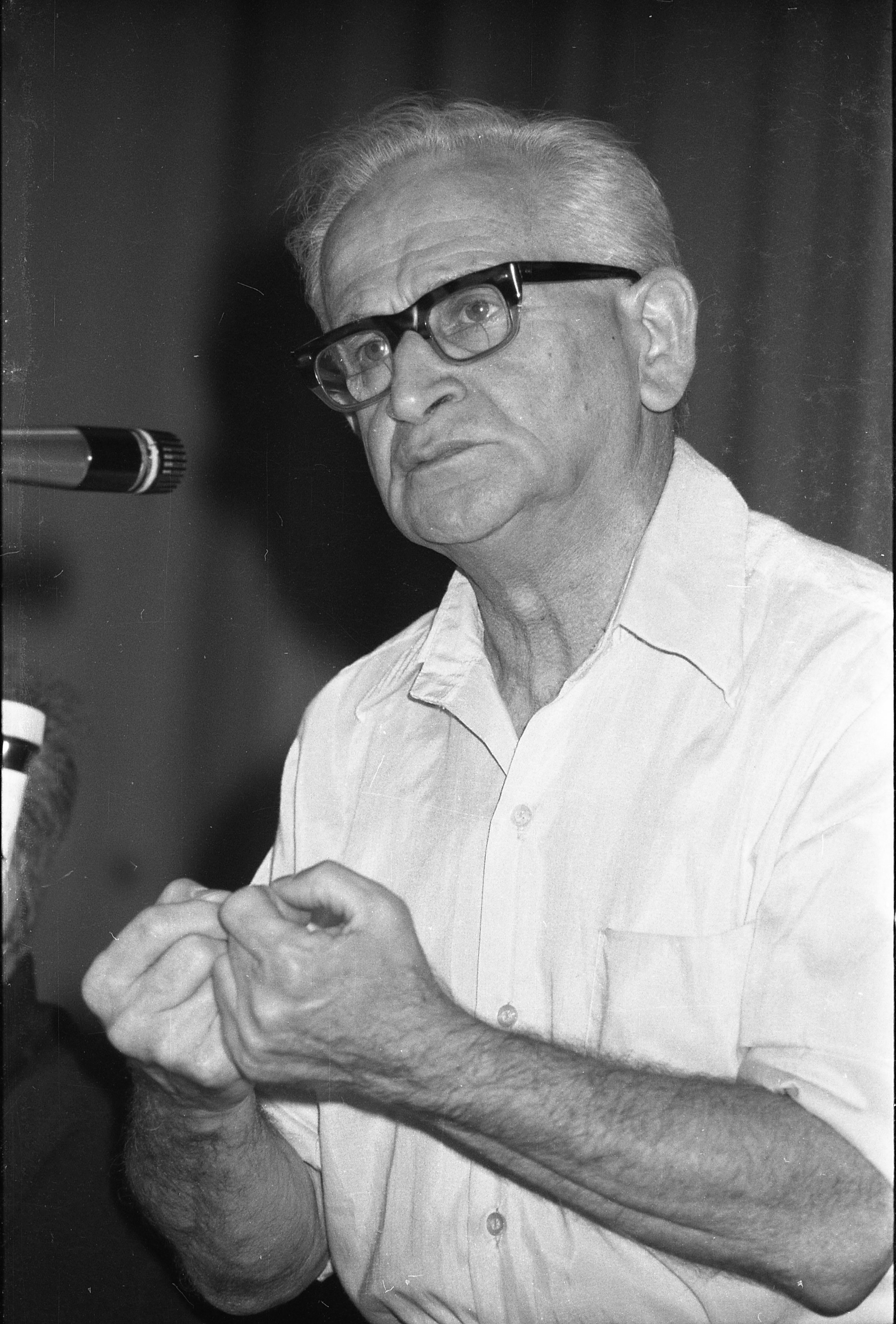
- Talmi in 1977

Faction represented in the Knesset
- 1974–1977: Alignment
- 1977: Mapam
- 1977–1981: Alignment

Personal details
- Born: 1909 Warsaw, Russian Empire
- Died: 18 November 1994 (aged 84–85)

Meir Talmi (Hebrew: מאיר תלמי; 1909 – 18 November 1994) was an Israeli politician who served as a member of the Knesset for the Alignment and Mapam between 1974 and 1981.

== Biography ==
Born in Warsaw in the Russian Empire (today in Poland), Talmi joined Hashomer Hatzair during his youth and was a member of the national leadership in Poland. He met his wife, Emma Levine, later also a Knesset member, when she visited Poland as an emissary of the movement. They later had three children, Yigal (born 1934), Yehuda (1940) and Binyamin (1946). In 1932 he emigrated to Mandatory Palestine, and became a member of kibbutz Mishmar HaEmek the following year. He started working in the Kibbutz Artzi movement, later becoming its secretary. He also joined Mapam and became the party's secretary general.

In 1973 he was elected to the Knesset on the Alignment list, an alliance of Mapam and the Labor Party. On 10 April 1977 Mapam broke away from the Alignment, but rejoined two days later. Talmi was re-elected in 1977 on the Alignment list, but lost his seat in the 1981 elections.

He died in 1994.
