= Hashomer Hatzair Workers Party =

Hashomer Hatzair Workers Party מפלגת פועלים השומר הצעיר
- Leader: Meir Ya'ari; Ya'akov Hazan
- Founded: 1946
- Merger of: Kibbutz Artzi; Socialist League of Palestine
- Merged into: Mapam
- Newspaper: Al HaMishmar
- Ideology: Marxism; Labor Zionism; Socialism

Election symbol
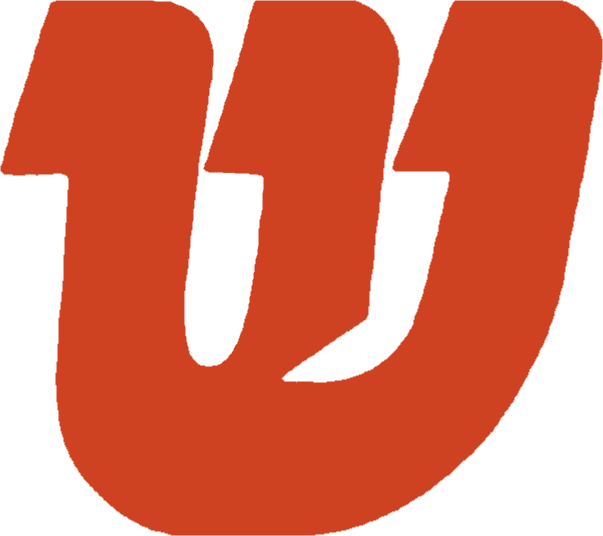

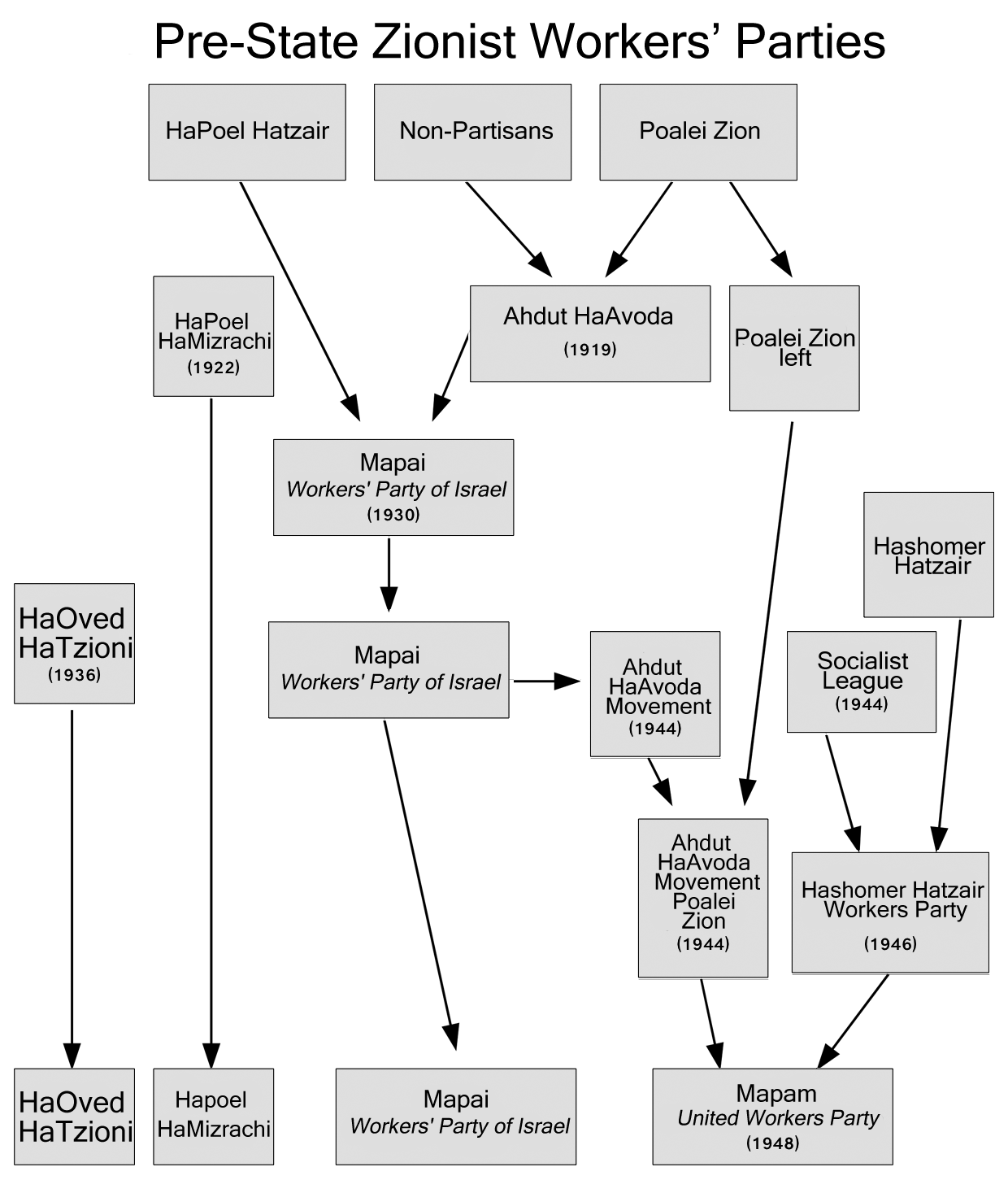
chart of zionist workers parties

1947 poster of party, celebrating the 30th anniversary of the October Revolution.

The Hashomer Hatzair Workers Party of Palestine (Hebrew: מִפְלֶגֶת פּוֹעָלִים הַשׁוֹמֵר הַצָעִיר בְּאֶרֶץ יִשְׂרָאֵל Mifleget Poalim Hashomer Hatzair be'Eretz Yisrael) was a Marxist-Zionist political party in the British Mandate of Palestine, connected to the Hashomer Hatzair movement.

== History ==
At the time of its foundation, in 1946, the party had around 10,000 members, two-thirds of whom hailed from the Kibbutz Artzi movement. The remainder came from the urban-based Socialist League of Palestine, which was dissolved into the party.

The Hashomer Hatzair movement had positioned itself politically between the moderate mainstream Mapai and the radical communists since the 1920s. The movement had however been reluctant to form a political party, since its leaders had felt that entering into party politics could push the movement into ideological deviations. The movement had tried to seek unity with Mapai and Ahdut HaAvoda before forming a party of its own, but those merger talks had failed as the other parties rejected the bi-nationalist positions of Hashomer Hatzair.

In contrast with Mapai, the main Labour Zionist party in Palestine at the time, the Hashomer Hatzair Workers Party put heavier emphasis on class struggle. The party could not achieve unity in action with the Palestine Communist Party, as the Hashomer Hatzair Workers Party supported aliyah whilst the communists had ambiguous positions on the issue.

The Hashomer Hatzair Workers Party was the sole Zionist political organization in Palestine at the time that recognized the national rights of the Palestinian Arabs. The party advocated a bi-national state, to be shared between Jews and Arabs. The party was repeatedly criticized by other Zionist groups for their bi-national position, accusing the party of breaking the united Zionist front. The party opposed partitioning Palestine, instead preferring converting the British Mandate into an international trusteeship. In the longer perspective, a 'Palestinian Commonwealth' with Jewish majority would be established. The party maintained links with Ihud, a small circle of Jewish intellectuals who shared the bi-national vision of the party.

In 1948 the party merged with Ahdut HaAvoda-Poalei Zion, forming the United Workers Party (MAPAM).

The party's newspaper was Al HaMishmar which subsequently transferred its affiliation to MAPAM.
