= 'Akbara =

'Akbara عكبرة
- Village
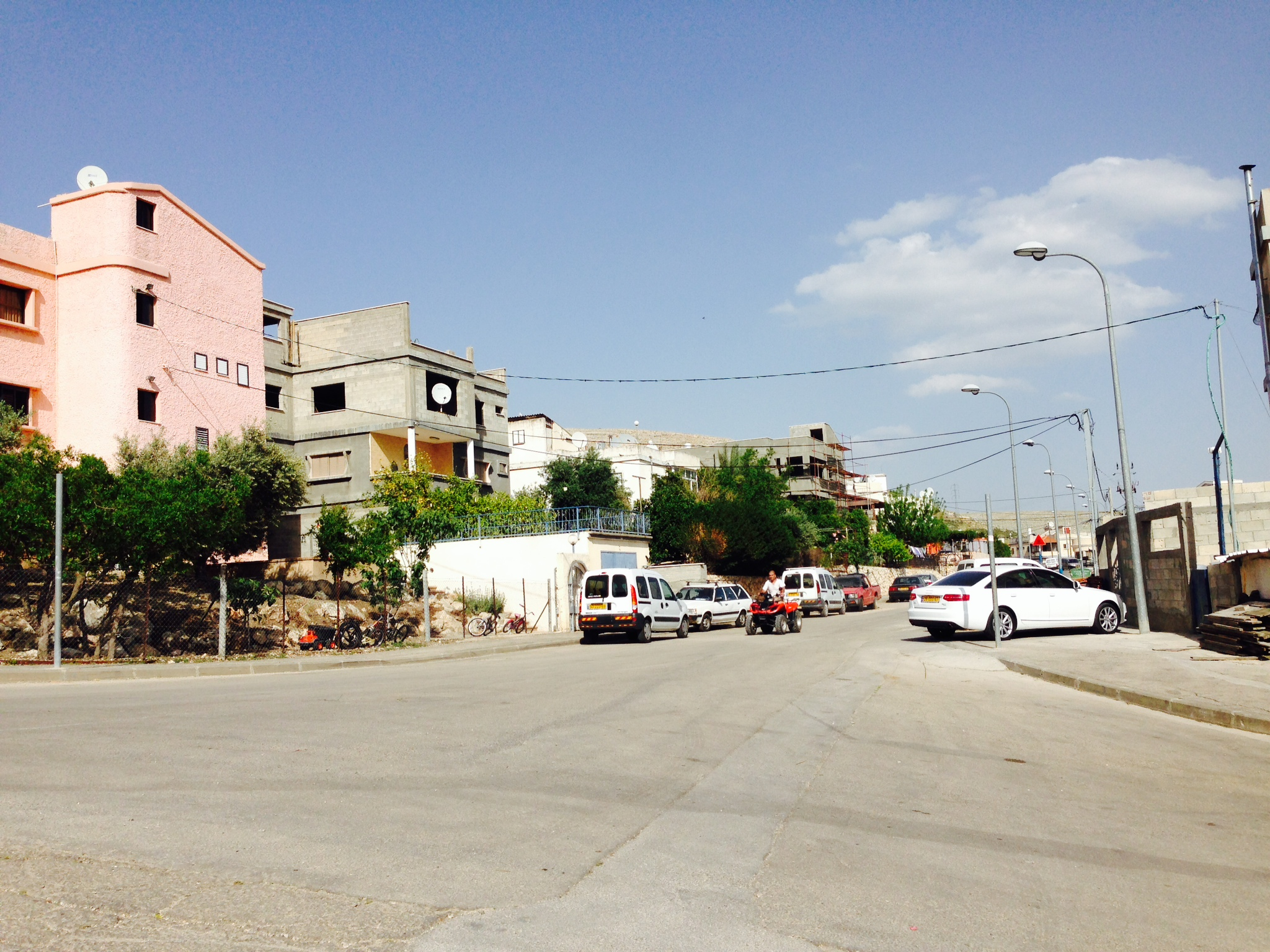
- Modern village of Akbara
- Etymology: possibly from male jerboa
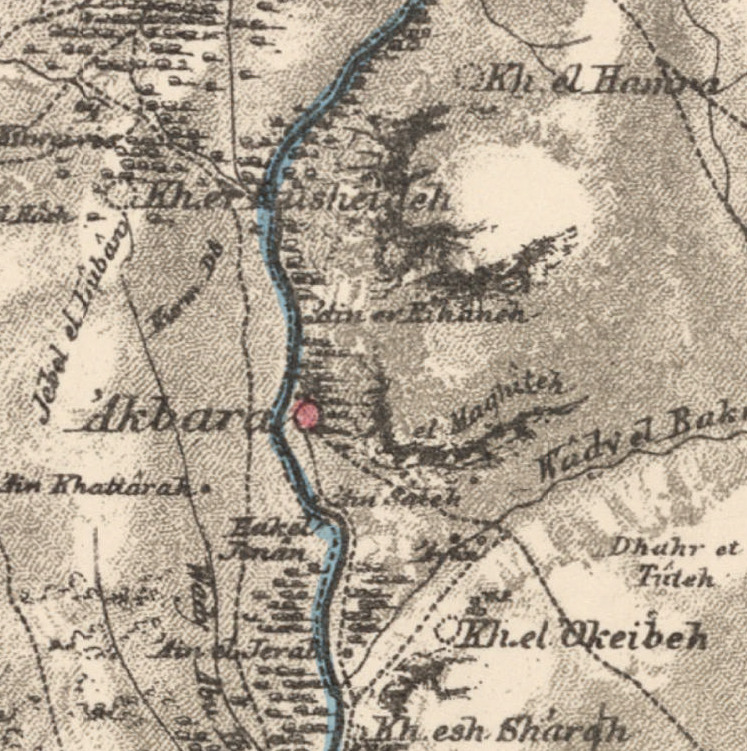
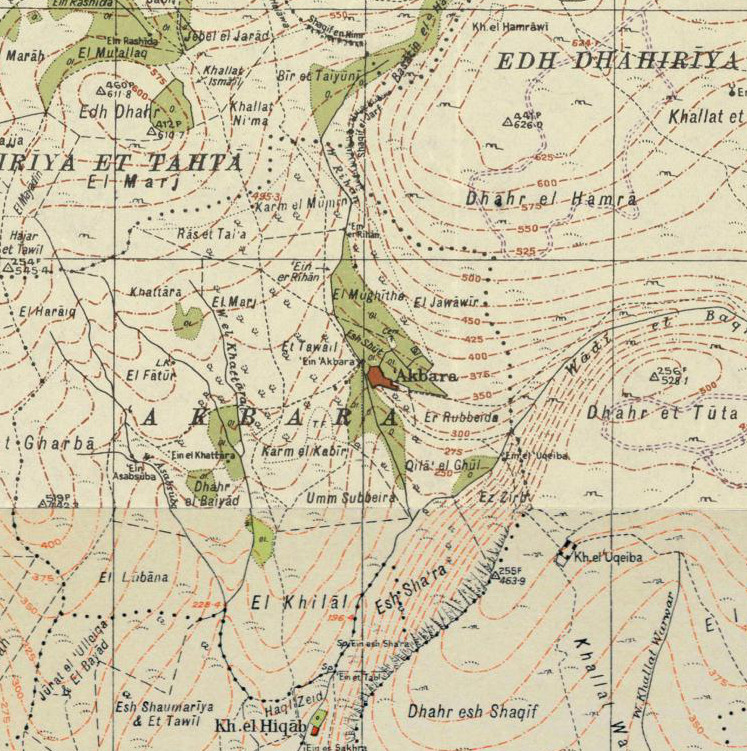
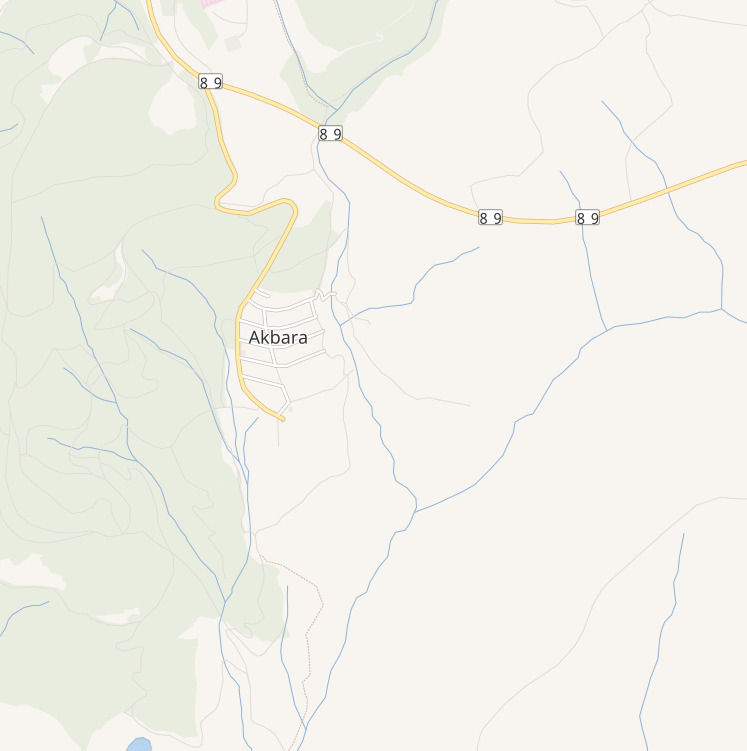
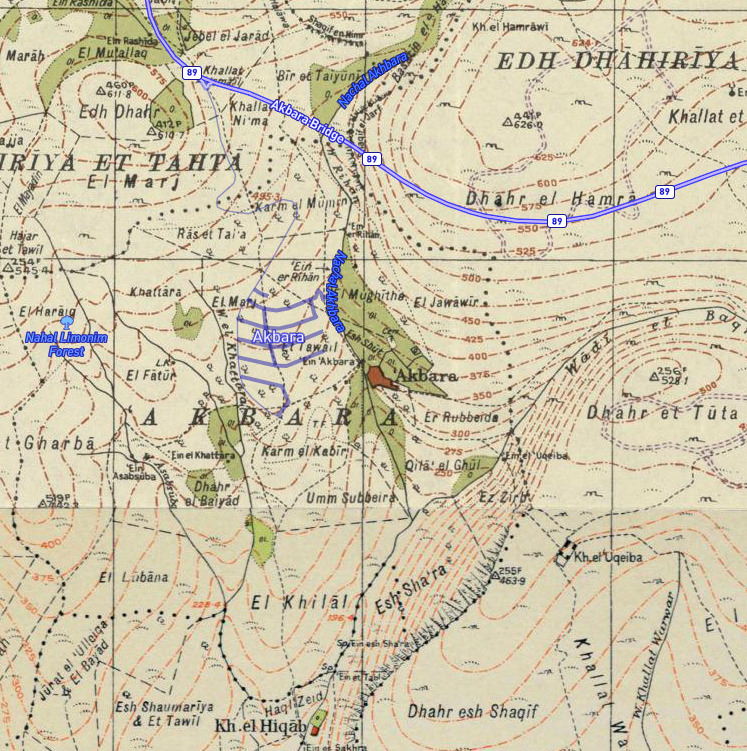
- 1870s map 1940s map modern map 1940s with modern overlay map A series of historical maps of the area around 'Akbara (click the buttons)

- Location within Mandatory Palestine
- Coordinates: 32°56′22″N 35°29′58″E
- Palestine grid: 197/260
- Geopolitical entity: Mandatory Palestine
- Subdistrict: Safad
- Date of depopulation: 10 May 1948

Area
  - Total: 3,224 dunams (3.224 km^{2}; 1.245 sq mi)

Population (1945)
  - Total: 390
- Cause(s) of depopulation: Military assault by Yishuv forces

'Akbara (Arabic: عكبرة) is an Arab village in the Israeli municipality of Safed, which included in 2010 more than 200 families. It is 2.5 km south of Safed City. The village was rebuilt in 1977, close to the old village destroyed in 1948 during the 1947–1949 Palestine war.

== Location ==
The village of 'Akbara was situated 2.5 km south of Safad, along the two sides of a deep wadi that ran north–south. Southeast of the village lay Khirbet al-'Uqeiba, identified as the Roman village Achabare, or Acchabaron. This khirba was a populated village as late as 1904.

== History ==
=== Second Temple ===
The first mention of 'Akbara is during the Second Temple period by Josephus Flavius who noted the rock of Acchabaron (Ακχαβαρων πετραν) among the places in the Upper Galilee he fortified as a preparation for the First Jewish Revolt, while leading rebel forces against the Romans in Galilee. This site is identified with caves situated along the cliffs south of 'Akbara.

The nearby Khirbet al-'Uqeiba was first excavated during the Mandate period, and was shown to contain remains such as building foundations, hewn stones, and wine presses. Cisterns, tombs, oil press and the walls of ancient synagogues have also been found. Foerster identifies the ruins as the "early Galilean type" synagogue. According to Liebner, a 1965 letter in the IAA composed by antiquities inspector N. Tfilinski notes a Hebrew inscription on a building stone found at the site. The current location of the stone is unknown.

Above the settlement, a 135 m high vertical cliff is located. There are one hundred and twenty-nine natural and man-made caves interconnected by passages in the cliff. According to tradition, those caves were used for shelter by Jews during their war with Romans. During archeological excavations, coins from Dor and Sepphoris were found in the caves, dating to the Roman emperor Trajan period.

=== Talmud ===
Akbara/Akbari/Akbora/Akborin is mentioned several times in Rabbinic literature as early as second half of the third century CE. According to some traditions Rabbi Yannai disciples lived in 'Akbara forming an agricultural community; R. Yannai established a bet midrash there. The earliest mention of this bet midrash is in the context of discussions between Rabbi Yohanan and sages of 'Akbara. The Talmud school of Rabbi Jose bar Abin was also in Akbara. Several of the rabbis mentioned in the tractate Pirkei Avot lived in 'Akbara. Akbara is mentioned as the burial place of several Talmudic sages: Rabbi Nehurai, Rabbi Yannai, and Rabbi Dostai, his son, buried "in the gardens" "by the spring". According to tradition, the body of Rabbi Elazar ben Simeon was laying for twenty two years in his widow's garret in Akbara since he told her not to allow his colleagues to bury him. Rabbi Elazar ben Simeon feared to be dishonoured due to his aid to the Romans.

=== Caliphates and Crusaders ===
The local Jewish community is attested during the Fatimid rule from 969 to 1099 by the Cairo Geniza. Samuel ben Samson visited 'Akbara during his 1210 Palestine pilgrimage and he described the tomb of Rabbi Meir he had found there. In 1258 Jacob of Paris visited Akbara and found there, according to Pirkei Avot, the tomb of Rabbi Nehurai.

=== Ottoman Empire ===
'Akbara was incorporated into the Ottoman Empire in 1517. Moshe Basola visited the village in 1522 and said that he had found there a "destroyed synagogue, 3 cubits high remaining on two sides". Later in 1968 the remains of the synagogue were identified by Foester. In the census of 1596, the village was part of the nahiya ("subdistrict") of Jira, which was a part of Liwa Safad, with a population of 36 households and 1 bachelor, all Muslims. It paid taxes on a number of crops and produce, including wheat, barley, summer crops, olives, occasional revenues, goats, beehives, and a press which was either used for processing grapes or olives; a total of 6,115 akçe. 6/24 of the revenue went to a waqf.

In 1648, Turkish traveler Evliya Tshelebi visited Galilee and reflected on the history of Akbara cliff caves:

"The children of Israel escaped the plague and hid in these caves. Then Allah sent them a bad spirit which caused them to perish within the caves. Their skeletons, heaped together, can be seen there to this day."

In 1838, it was noted as a village in the Safad district, while in 1875 the archeologist Victor Guérin visited, and described it thus:

"The ruins of Akbara cover a hillock whose slopes were formerly sustained by walls forming terraces; the threshing floors of an Arab village occupy the summit. Round these are grouped the remains of ancient constructions now overthrown." "The village lies on the east of the wady. It is dominated by a platform on which foundations can be traced of a rectangular enclosure called el Kuneiseh, measuring thirty paces in length by twenty-three in breadth. It stands east and west, and was firmly constructed of good cut stones. The interior is at present given up to cultivation. This enclosure seems to have been once a Christian church."

In 1881, the PEF's Survey of Western Palestine (SWP) described Akbara as a village of stone and adobe with about 90 inhabitants who cultivated olive and fig trees.

A population list from about 1887 showed Akbara to have about 335 inhabitants, all Muslims.

=== British Mandate ===
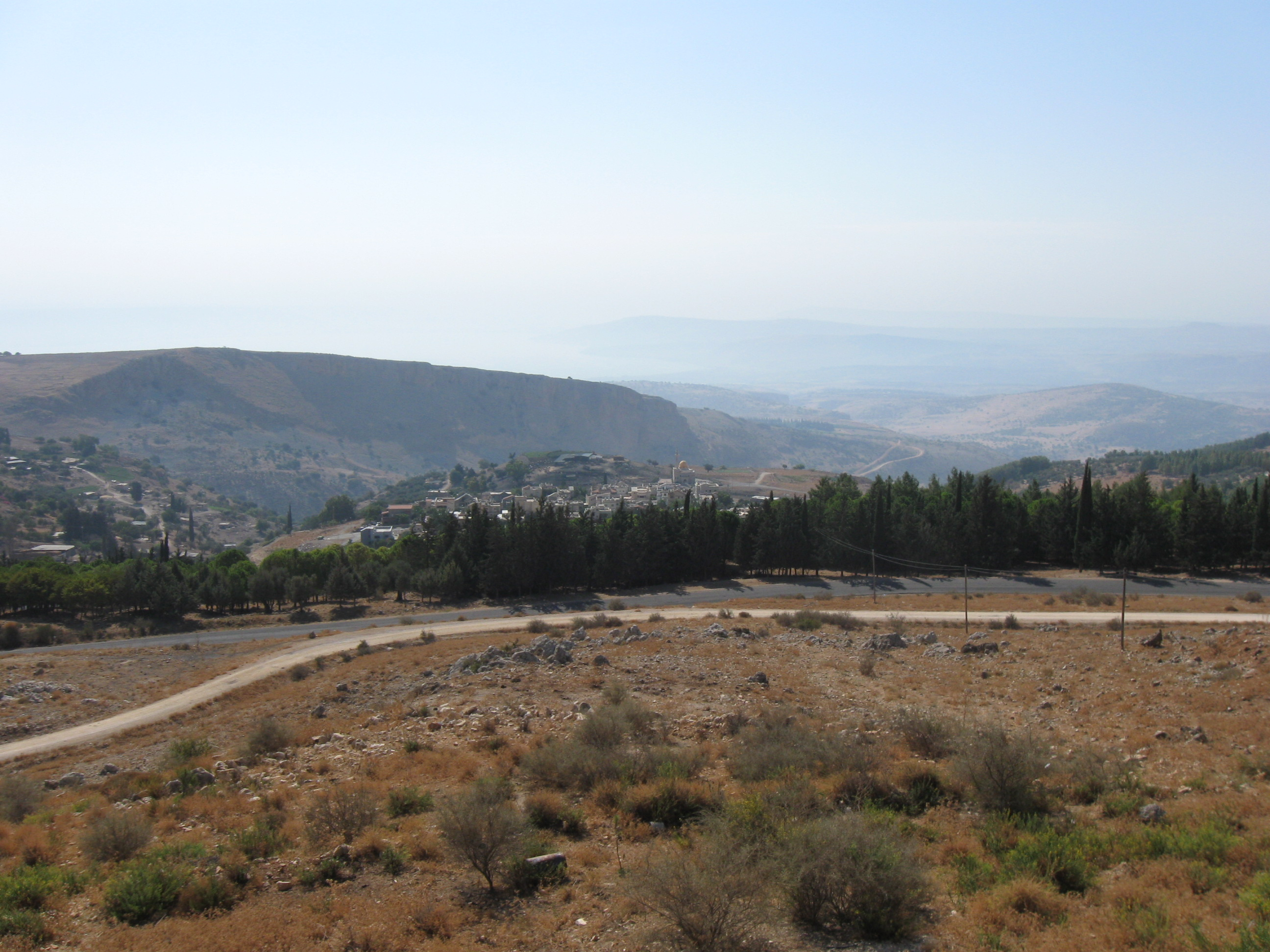
'Akbara, as seen from adjacent hill

In the 1922 census of Palestine conducted by the British Mandate authorities, Akbara had a population of 147; all Muslims, increasing in the 1931 census to 275, still all Muslims, in a total of 49 houses.

During this period the village houses were made of masonry. In the 1945 statistics the population was 390 Muslims, and the total land area was 3,224 dunums; 2,222 dunums was used for cereals, 199 dunums were irrigated or used for orchards, and 6 dunams were built-up (urban) land.

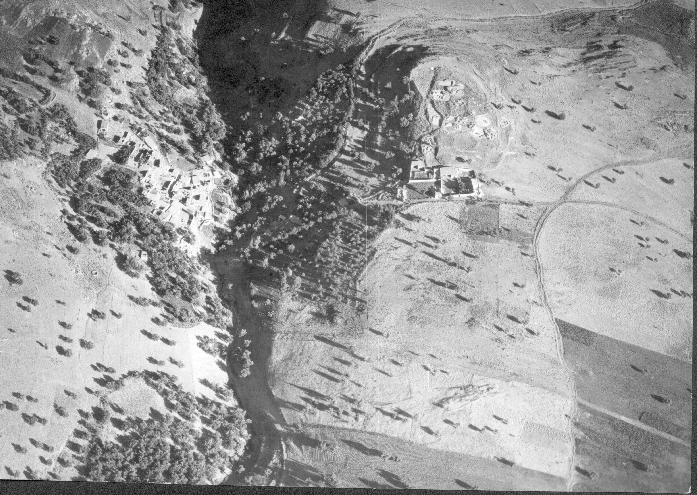
'Akbara before its conquest on 9 May 1948

=== Israel ===
During the siege of Safad 'Akbara was targeted for occupation in line with Plan Dalet. The Hagana attack was launched on 9 May and completed by the Palmach's first battalion. It was found that many of the villagers had fled due to news of Deir Yassin and 'Ein al Zeitun, the village was then blown up and destroyed.

On 25 May 1948, during Operation Yiftah, under the command of Yigal Allon, Galilee was cleared of its Palestinian Arab population. Following the 25 May exodus of al-Khisas, the last 55 villagers who had remained in their homes for just over a year were "transferred" by Israeli forces despite having friendly relations and collaboration with Jewish settlements in the area. During the night of 5/6 June 1949, the village of al-Khisas was surrounded by trucks and the villagers were forced into the trucks "with kicks, curses and maltreatment," in the words of a Mapam Knesset member, Elizer Peri, quoted by Morris:

"The remaining villagers said that they had been 'forced with their hands to destroy their dwellings,' and had been treated like 'cattle.' They were then dumped on a bare, sun-scorched hillside near the village of 'Akbara where they were left 'wandering in the wilderness, thirsty and hungry.' They lived there under inhuman conditions for years afterwards," along with the inhabitants of at least two other villages (Qaddita and al-Ja'una) expelled in similar circumstances.

The expellees remained at ’Akbara for eighteen years until agreeing to resettlement in Wadi Hamam.

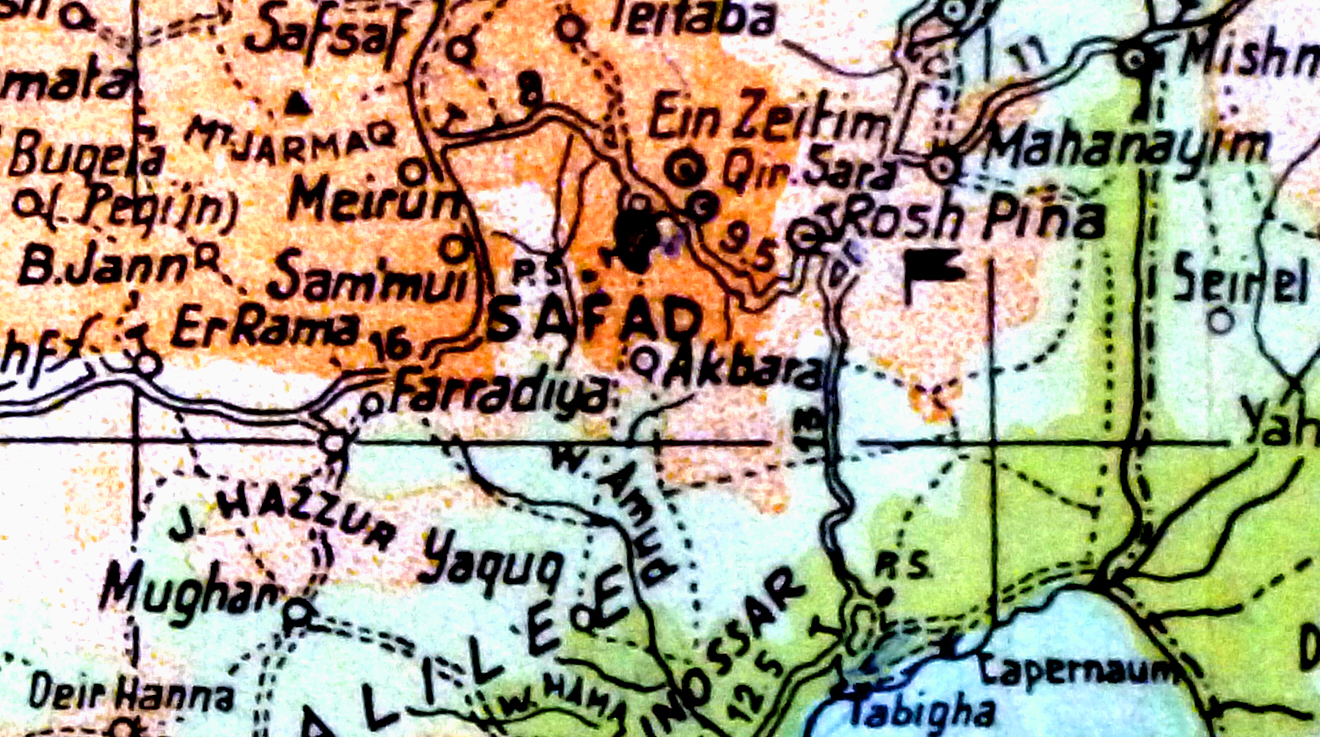
'Akbara, 1946

Salman Abu-Sitta, author of the Atlas of Palestine, estimated that the number of Palestinian refugees from 'Akbara in 1998 was 1,852 people.

Of what remains of 'Akbara's built structures, Walid Khalidi wrote in 1992 that "the original inhabitants of the village were replaced by 'internal' refugees from Qaddita villages several kilometers north of Safd. Since 1980, however, these internal refugees have been gradually relocated to the nearby, planned village of 'Akbara, 0.5 km west of the old village site. As a precondition of the relocation, each family was required to demolish its home in the former village. Today, fifteen of the old houses still stand on the site, in addition to the school. The new village of 'Akbara was placed under the administration of the city of Safad in 1977. It is now a neighbourhood of the city of Safed.

== See also ==
- List of massacres committed during the 1948 Arab-Israeli war

== Bibliography ==
- Barron, J.B., ed. (1923). Palestine: Report and General Abstracts of the Census of 1922. Government of Palestine.
- Benvenisti, M. (2002). Sacred Landscape: The Buried History of the Holy Land Since 1948. University of California Press. ISBN 978-0-520-23422-2.
- Conder, C.R.; Kitchener, H.H. (1881). The Survey of Western Palestine: Memoirs of the Topography, Orography, Hydrography, and Archaeology. Vol. 1. London: Committee of the Palestine Exploration Fund. (p. 205)
- Dauphin, C. (1998). La Palestine byzantine, Peuplement et Populations. BAR International Series 726 (in French). Vol. III : Catalogue. Oxford: Archeopress. ISBN 0860549054.
- Department of Statistics (1945). Village Statistics, April, 1945. Government of Palestine.
- Gelber, Y. (2006). Palestine 1948: War, Escape And The Emergence Of The Palestinian Refugee Problem. Sussex Academic Press. ISBN 1-84519-075-0.
- Guérin, V. (1880). Description Géographique Historique et Archéologique de la Palestine (in French). Vol. 3: Galilee, pt. 1. Paris: L'Imprimerie Nationale.
- Hadawi, S. (1970). Village Statistics of 1945: A Classification of Land and Area ownership in Palestine. Palestine Liberation Organization Research Center.
- Hütteroth, W.-D.; Abdulfattah, K. (1977). Historical Geography of Palestine, Transjordan and Southern Syria in the Late 16th Century. Erlanger Geographische Arbeiten, Sonderband 5. Erlangen, Germany: Vorstand der Fränkischen Geographischen Gesellschaft. ISBN 3-920405-41-2.
- Khalidi, W. (1992). All That Remains:The Palestinian Villages Occupied and Depopulated by Israel in 1948. Washington D.C.: Institute for Palestine Studies. ISBN 0-88728-224-5.
- Leibner, Uzi (2009). Settlement and History in Hellenistic, Roman, and Byzantine Galilee: An Archaeological Survey of the Eastern Galilee. Mohr Siebeck. ISBN 978-3-16-149871-8.
- Mills, E., ed. (1932). Census of Palestine 1931. Population of Villages, Towns and Administrative Areas. Jerusalem: Government of Palestine.
- Moore, Dahlia; Aweiss, Salem (2004). Bridges Over Troubled Water: A Comparative Study Of Jews, Arabs, and Palestinians. Praeger/Greenwood. ISBN 0-275-98060-X.
- Morris, B. (2004). The Birth of the Palestinian Refugee Problem Revisited. Cambridge University Press. ISBN 978-0-521-00967-6.
- Nazzal, Nafez (1978). The Palestinian Exodus from Galilee 1948. Beirut: The Institute for Palestine Studies. pp. 43–45. ISBN 9780887281280.
- Palmer, E.H. (1881). The Survey of Western Palestine: Arabic and English Name Lists Collected During the Survey by Lieutenants Conder and Kitchener, R. E. Transliterated and Explained by E.H. Palmer. Committee of the Palestine Exploration Fund.
- Rhode, H. (1979). Administration and Population of the Sancak of Safed in the Sixteenth Century (PhD). Columbia University. Archived from the original on 2020-03-01.
- Robinson, E.; Smith, E. (1841). Biblical Researches in Palestine, Mount Sinai and Arabia Petraea: A Journal of Travels in the year 1838. Vol. 3. Boston: Crocker & Brewster.
- Rogan, E.; Shlaim, A. (2007). The War for Palestine: Rewriting the History of 1948. Cambridge University Press. ISBN 978-0-521-87598-1.
- Schumacher, G. (1888). "Population list of the Liwa of Akka". Quarterly Statement - Palestine Exploration Fund. 20: 169–191.
- Tsafrir, Y.; Leah Di Segni; Judith Green (1994). (TIR): Tabula Imperii Romani: Judaea, Palaestina. Jerusalem: Israel Academy of Sciences and Humanities. ISBN 965-208-107-8.
