= Al-Ja'una =

Al-Ja'una الجاعونة Jaauneh
- Village
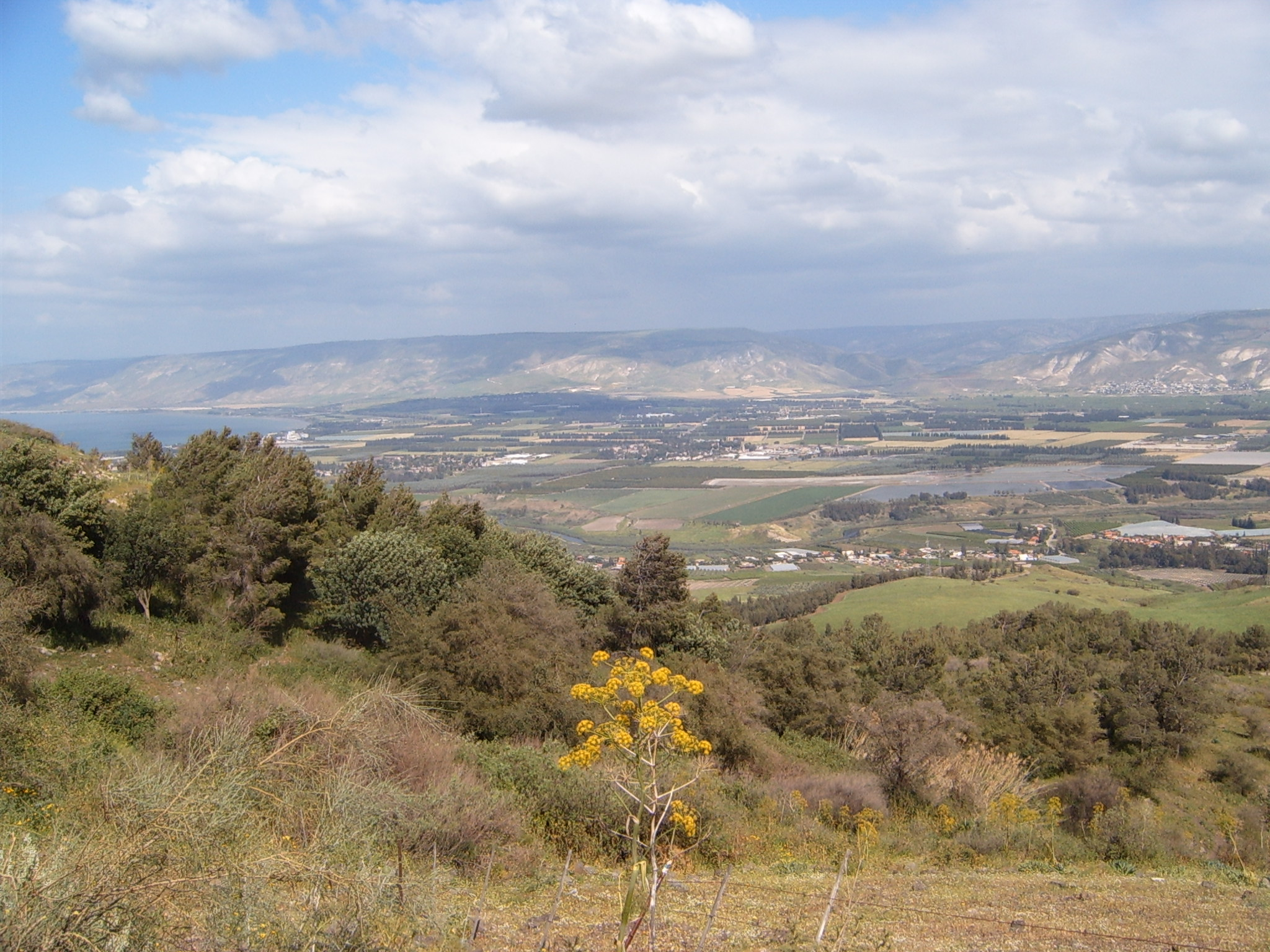
- The village overlooked the Jordan Valley
- Etymology: from personal name
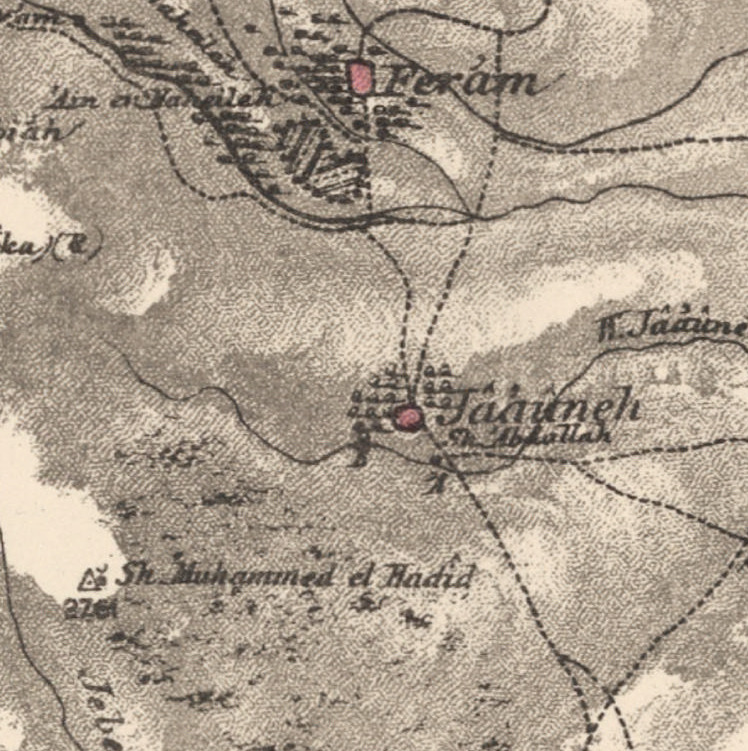
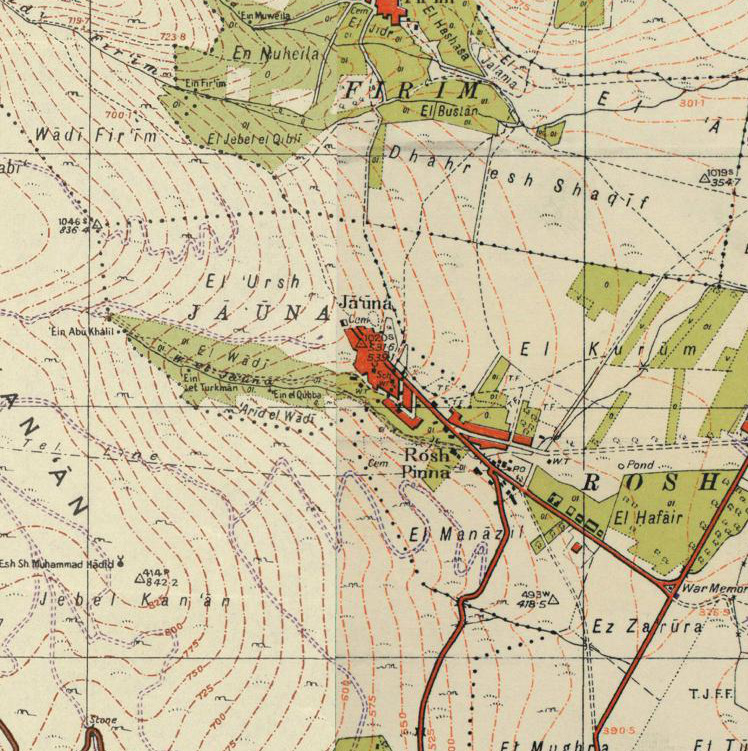
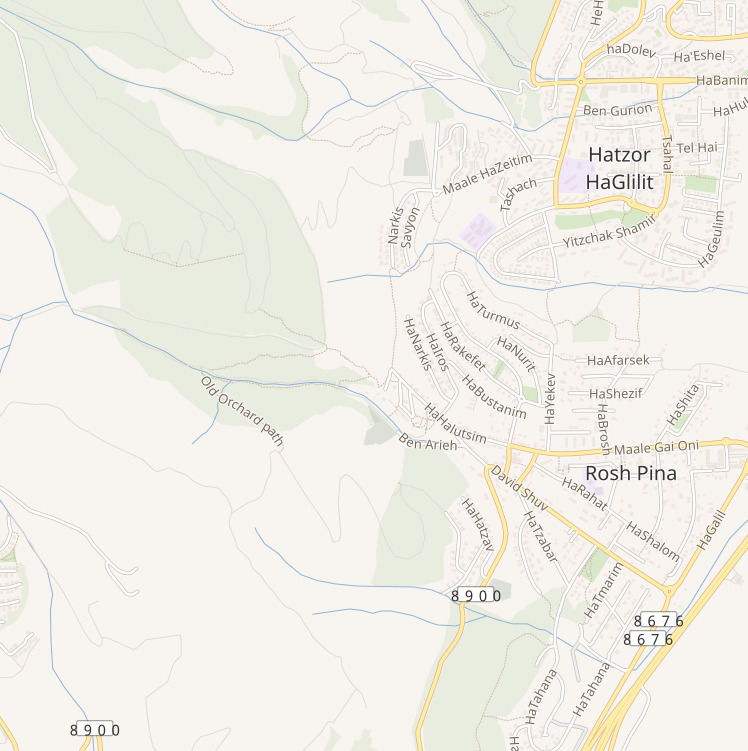
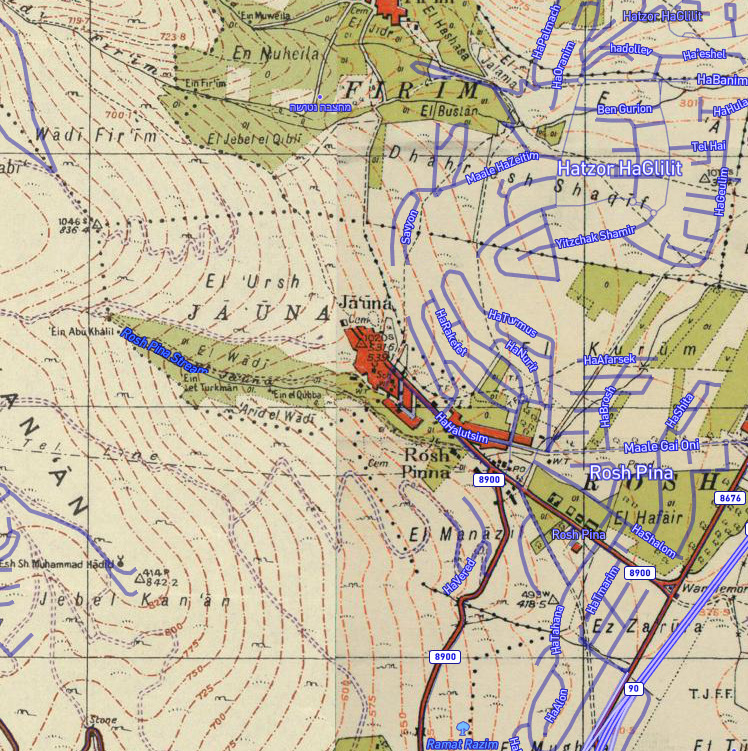
- 1870s map 1940s map modern map 1940s with modern overlay map A series of historical maps of the area around Al-Ja'una (click the buttons)

- Location within Mandatory Palestine
- Coordinates: 32°58′18″N 35°31′58″E
- Palestine grid: 200/264
- Geopolitical entity: Mandatory Palestine
- Subdistrict: Safad
- Date of depopulation: 9 May 1948

Area
  - Total: 839 dunams (83.9 ha; 207 acres)

Population (1945)
  - Total: 1,150
- Cause(s) of depopulation: Forced removal
- Current Localities: Rosh Pinna

Al-Ja'una or Ja'ouna (Arabic: الجاعونة), was a Palestinian village situated in Galilee near Hula Valley (al-Houleh Plateau), overlooking the Jordan Valley. The village lay on a hillside 450–500 meters above sea level, 5 kilometers east of Safed near a major road connecting Safad with Tabariya (Tiberias). The village had its Arab residents expelled by Zionist forces in 1948 and was thereafter resettled by Jews, becoming a part of the Israeli settlement of Rosh Pinna.

== History ==
Broken pillars and a capital have been found here.

=== Ottoman era ===
Al-Ja'una was mentioned in the 1596 Ottoman census as being a village in the nahiya (subdistrict) of Jira, in the Safad Sanjak, with 27 households and 4 bachelors, an estimated population of 171. All the villagers were Muslim. The villagers paid a fixed tax rate of 25% on various agricultural products, such as wheat, barley, olives, goats, beehives, and a powered mill; a total of 2,832 akçe. 1/12 of the revenue went to a Muslim charitable institution.

The village appeared under the name of Gahoun on the map that Pierre Jacotin compiled during Napoleon's invasion of 1799.

In 1838, it was noted as el-Ja'uneh, a Muslim village, located in the el-Khait district.

In 1875, Victor Guérin found that Al-Ja'una had 200 Muslim inhabitants.

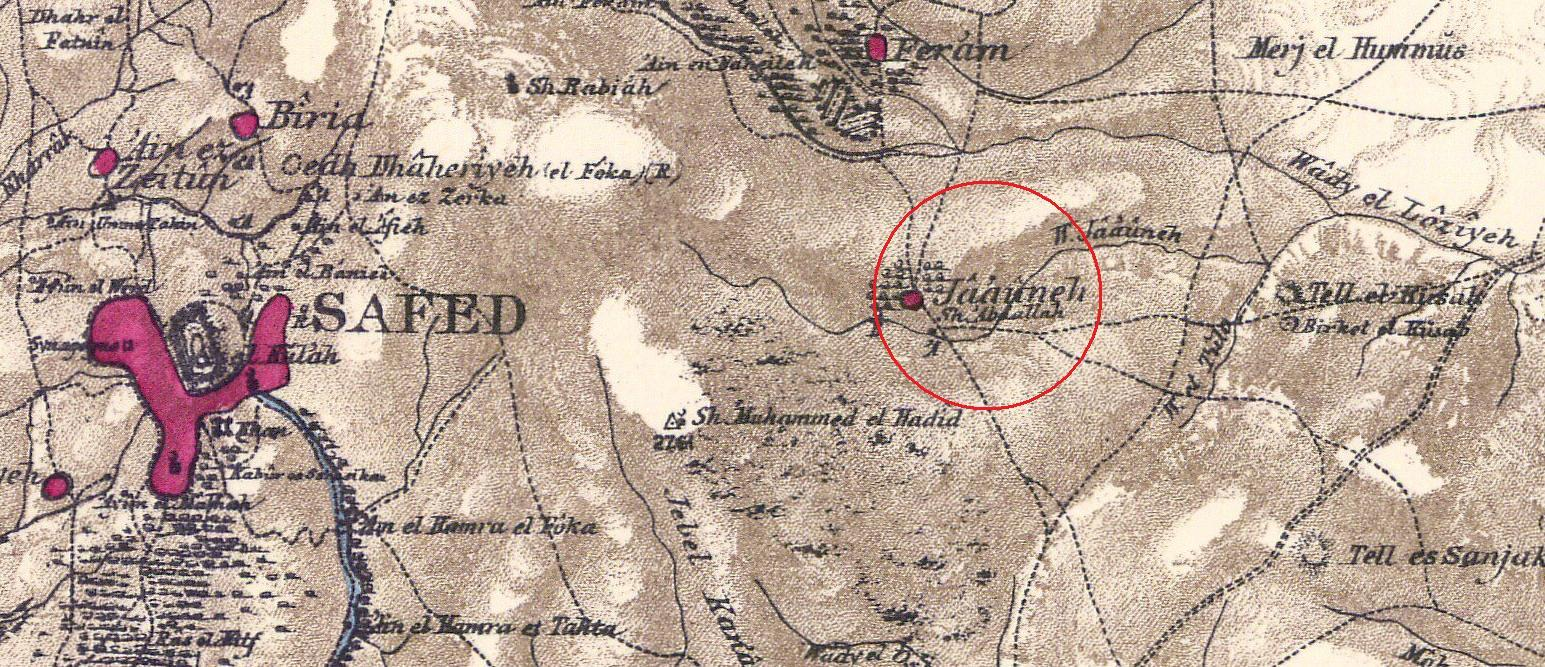
Al-Ja'una in a map of the Palestine Exploration Fund, 1880

In 1881 the PEF's Survey of Western Palestine described it as a stone village of 140-200 residents who grew figs and olives. There were two springs in a wadi, south of the village. A mosque and an elementary school for boys was established in the village in Ottoman times.

The settlement of Rosh Pinna is located to the southeast of the village site. It was first established in 1878 on land purchased from the villagers of al-Ja'una but has expanded over the years to include part of the former village land of Al-Ja'una.

Laurence Oliphant visited Rosh Pinna and Al-Ja'una in 1886, and wrote:

Jauna, which was the name of the village to which I was bound, was situated about three miles (5 km) from Safad, in a gorge, from which, as we descended it, a magnificent view was obtained over the Jordan valley, with the Lake of Tiberias lying three thousand feet below us on the right, and the waters of Merom, or the Lake of Huleh, on the left. The intervening plain was a rich expanse of country, only waiting development. The new colony had been established about eight months, the land having been purchased from the Moslem villagers, of whom twenty families remained, who lived on terms of perfect amity with the Jews.

A population list from about 1887 showed Ja’auneh to have about 930 inhabitants; 555 Muslims and 375 Druze.

=== British Mandate era ===
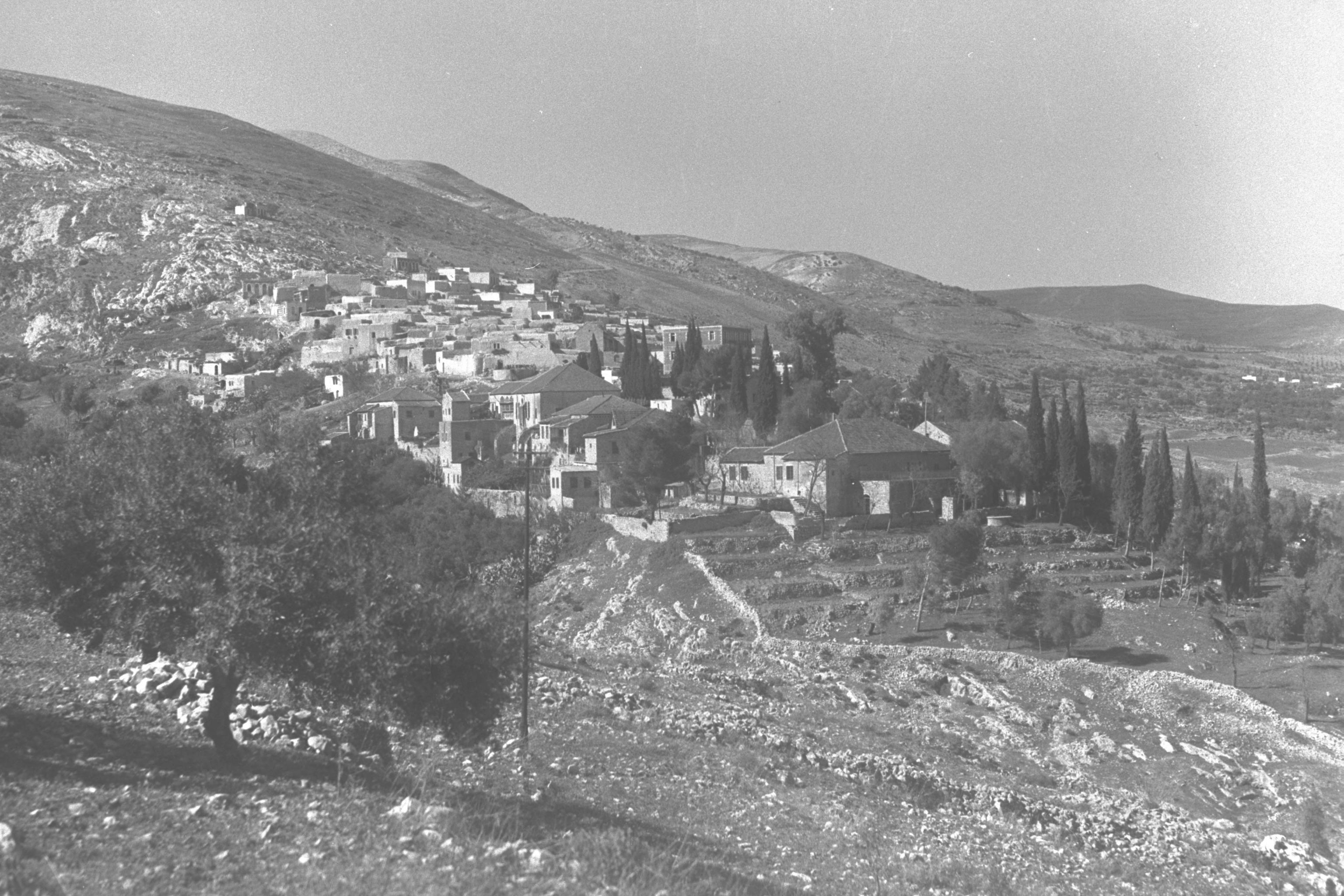
a-Ja’una 1937

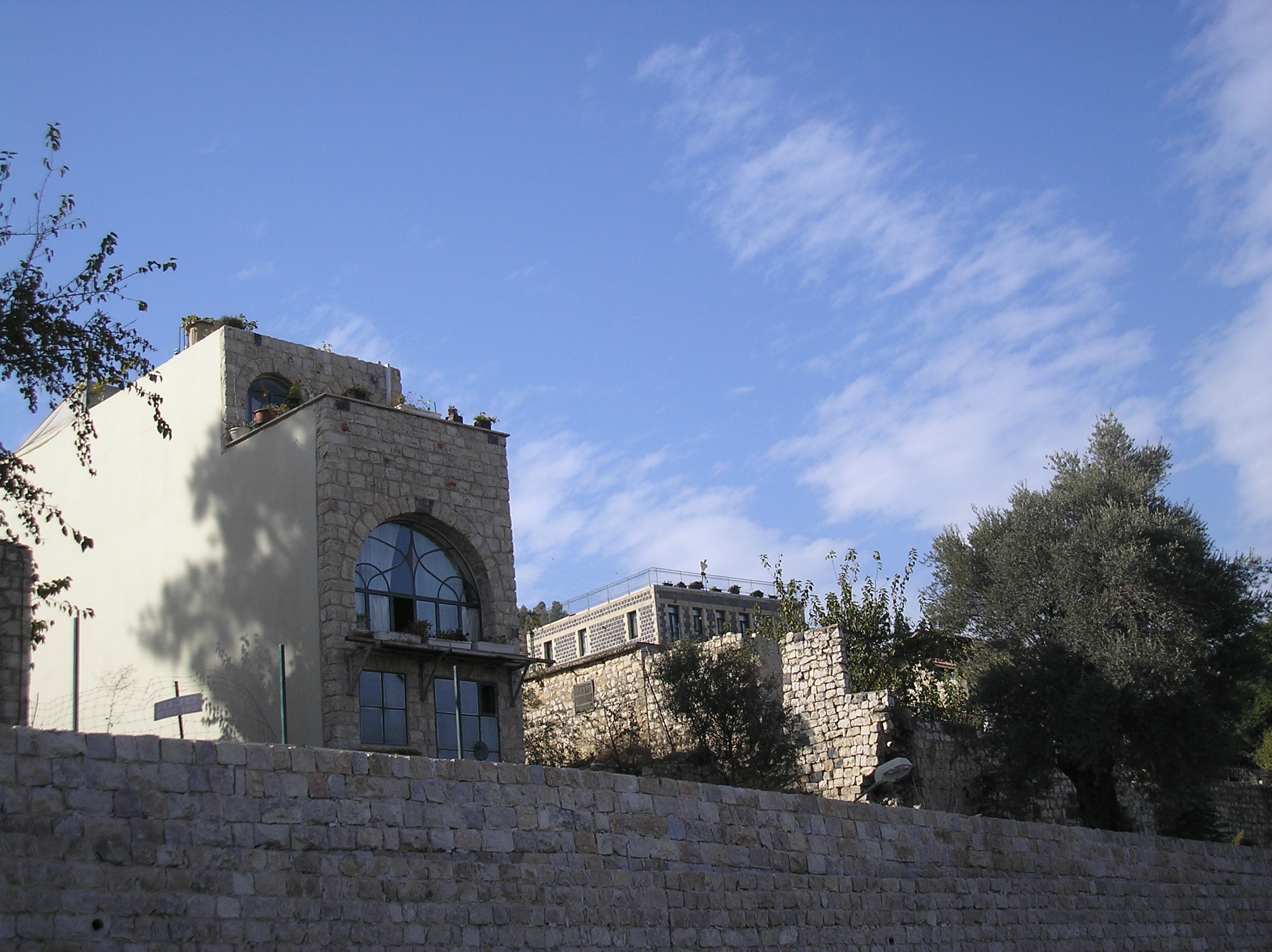
To the right: the top of "The American House", built by an Al-Ja'una villager who had worked in America

In the 1922 census of Palestine, conducted by the British Mandate authorities, Ja'uneh had a population of 626; all Muslims, increasing in the 1931 census to 799, still all Muslims, in a total of 149 houses.

Felix Salten visited Rosh Pinna in 1924 and noted also Al-Ja'una in his travel book Neue Menschen auf alter Erde:

Right next to Rosh Pin[n]a, the Arab village Dzha’une. These early settlers still employ Arab workers, a practice that naturally had to cease within the new rebuilding movement. The Arabian children of Dzha’une all go to school that has been built for them by the settlement [of Rosh Pinna] and they are taught Hebrew there.

In the 1945 statistics the population was 1,150 Muslims, and the total land area was 839 dunums; 824 of which were owned by Arabs, 7 by Jews, and 8 public. Of this, 172 dunums were plantations and irrigable land, 248 used for cereals, while 43 dunams were built-up (urban) land.

=== 1948 Palestine war, depopulation, and aftermath ===
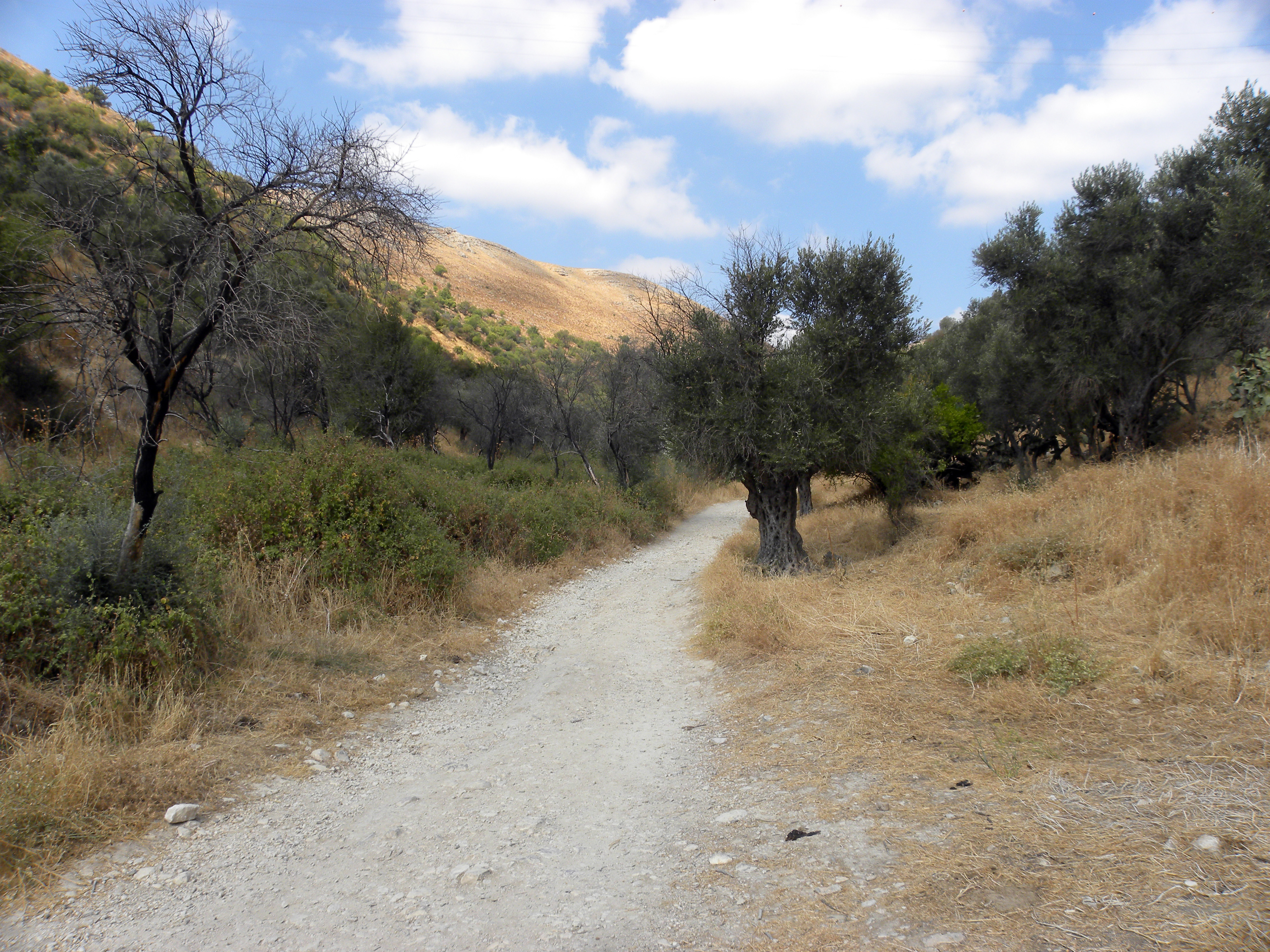
The old road leading to Safad

The village was forcibly depopulated during the 1948 Arab–Israeli War. According to Israeli historian Benny Morris, the evacuation of the residents took place either in late April, or on 9 May, coinciding with the final attack on Safad.

At midnight on 5–6 June 1949, the remaining villagers in Al-Ja'una (together with those of Al-Khisas and Qaytiyya) were surrounded by Israeli Defence Force units, who then forced the villagers into trucks "with brutality—with kicks, curses and maltreatment...." (according to Knesset member and Al HaMishmar editor Eliezer Peri) and left them on a hill near 'Akbara. When questioned about the expulsions, David Ben-Gurion responded that there was "sufficient" military justification. 'Akbara served as a "dumping spot" for the "remainders" from various depopulated Palestinian villages, and its conditions were to remain bad for years.

Walid Khalidi, writing in 1992 about the remains of Al-Ja'una, stated: "The settlement of Rosh Pinna occupies the village site. Many of the houses remain; some are used by the residents of the settlement; other stone houses have been abandoned and destroyed."

== See also ==
- List of towns and villages depopulated during the 1947–1949 Palestine war
- Abdallah Al-Asbah

== Bibliography ==
- Barron, J. B., ed. (1923). Palestine: Report and General Abstracts of the Census of 1922. Government of Palestine.
- Conder, C.R.; Kitchener, H. H. (1881). The Survey of Western Palestine: Memoirs of the Topography, Orography, Hydrography, and Archaeology. Vol. 1. London: Committee of the Palestine Exploration Fund.
- Department of Statistics (1945). Village Statistics, April, 1945. Government of Palestine.
- Guérin, V. (1880). Description Géographique Historique et Archéologique de la Palestine (in French). Vol. 3: Galilee, pt. 2. Paris: L'Imprimerie Nationale.
- Hadawi, S. (1970). Village Statistics of 1945: A Classification of Land and Area ownership in Palestine. Palestine Liberation Organization Research Center. Archived from the original on 2018-12-08.
- Hütteroth, W.-D.; Abdulfattah, K. (1977). Historical Geography of Palestine, Transjordan and Southern Syria in the Late 16th Century. Erlanger Geographische Arbeiten, Sonderband 5. Erlangen, Germany: Vorstand der Fränkischen Geographischen Gesellschaft. ISBN 3-920405-41-2.
- Karmon, Y. (1960). "An Analysis of Jacotin's Map of Palestine" (PDF). Israel Exploration Journal. 10 (3, 4): 155–173, 244–253. Archived from the original (PDF) on 2019-12-22.
- Khalidi, W. (1992). All That Remains:The Palestinian Villages Occupied and Depopulated by Israel in 1948. Washington D.C.: Institute for Palestine Studies. ISBN 0-88728-224-5.
- Mills, E., ed. (1932). Census of Palestine 1931. Population of Villages, Towns and Administrative Areas. Jerusalem: Government of Palestine.
- Morris, B. (2004). The Birth of the Palestinian Refugee Problem Revisited. Cambridge University Press. ISBN 978-0-521-00967-6.
- Oliphant, L. (1887). Haifa, or Life in Modern Palestine.
- Palmer, E. H. (1881). The Survey of Western Palestine: Arabic and English Name Lists Collected During the Survey by Lieutenants Conder and Kitchener, R. E. Transliterated and Explained by E.H. Palmer. Committee of the Palestine Exploration Fund. (p. 71)
- Rhode, H. (1979). Administration and Population of the Sancak of Safed in the Sixteenth Century. Columbia University. Archived from the original on 2020-03-01.
- Robinson, E.; Smith, E. (1841). Biblical Researches in Palestine, Mount Sinai and Arabia Petraea: A Journal of Travels in the year 1838. Vol. 3. Boston: Crocker & Brewster.
- Schumacher, G. (1888). "Population list of the Liwa of Akka". Quarterly Statement - Palestine Exploration Fund. 20: 169–191.
