= Yosef Harish =

Israeli Attorney General (1923–2013)

- יוסף חריש

Attorney General of Israel
- In office 1986–1993
- Preceded by: Yitzhak Zamir
- Succeeded by: Michael Ben-Yair

Personal details
- Born: 15 September 1923 Jerusalem, Mandatory Palestine
- Died: 6 November 2013 (aged 90) Tel Aviv, Israel
- Education: Hebrew University of Jerusalem
- Occupation: Jurist

Yosef Harish (Hebrew: יוסף חריש; 15 September 1923 – 6 November 2013) was an Israeli jurist who served as the country's Attorney General between 1986 and 1993.

== Biography ==
Born in Jerusalem on 15 September 1923, Harish was educated in a yeshiva. He joined the Haganah, and volunteered for the British Army during World War II. He was arrested during Operation Agatha in 1946 and spent six months in an internment camp, before later serving as an officer in the 1948 Arab-Israeli War.

He studied for bachelor's and master's degrees in law at the Hebrew University of Jerusalem, and began working as a magistrate. He became a judge in the Tel Aviv District court in 1969, and later became its vice-president. In 1986 Harish was appointed Attorney General. His predecessor Yitzhak Zamir had resigned after refusing to abandon an investigation into the activities of the head of Israel's GSS. A year later Harish set up the Landau Commission to investigate methods used by the GSS.

He left the post on 1 November 1993 and was replaced by Michael Ben-Yair.

Harish died on 6 November 2013. At the time of his death, he resided in the Ramat Aviv area of Tel Aviv.
