= Al-Dawayima massacre =

1948 Israeli killing of Palestinian civilians

- Part of 1948 Arab–Israeli War
- Location: 31°32′10″N 34°54′43″E; Al-Dawayima
- Date: October 29, 1948
- Target: Palestinian civilians
- Deaths: 80-200+ civilians
- Perpetrator: Israel Defense Forces

The al-Dawayima massacre was the killing of Palestinian civilians by the Israeli army (IDF) that took place in the town of al-Dawayima on October 29, 1948, during the 1948 Arab–Israeli War. The incident occurred after the town was occupied by the IDF's 89th Commando Battalion during Operation Yoav, encountering little resistance.

Benny Morris has estimated that hundreds of people were killed. Lieutenant-General John Bagot Glubb, the British commander of Jordan's Arab Legion stated the numbers were much smaller, citing a UN report for a figure of 30 women and children killed. A follow-up report delivered to the United Nations by a delegation from the Arab Refugee Congress reported that the Arab Legion had had an interest in underplaying the extent of the massacre, which was, it claimed, worse than the Deir Yassin massacre, in order to avoid further panic and refugee flight. The village mukhtar Hassan Mahmoud Ihdeib, in a sworn statement, estimated the number of victims as 145.

== Background ==
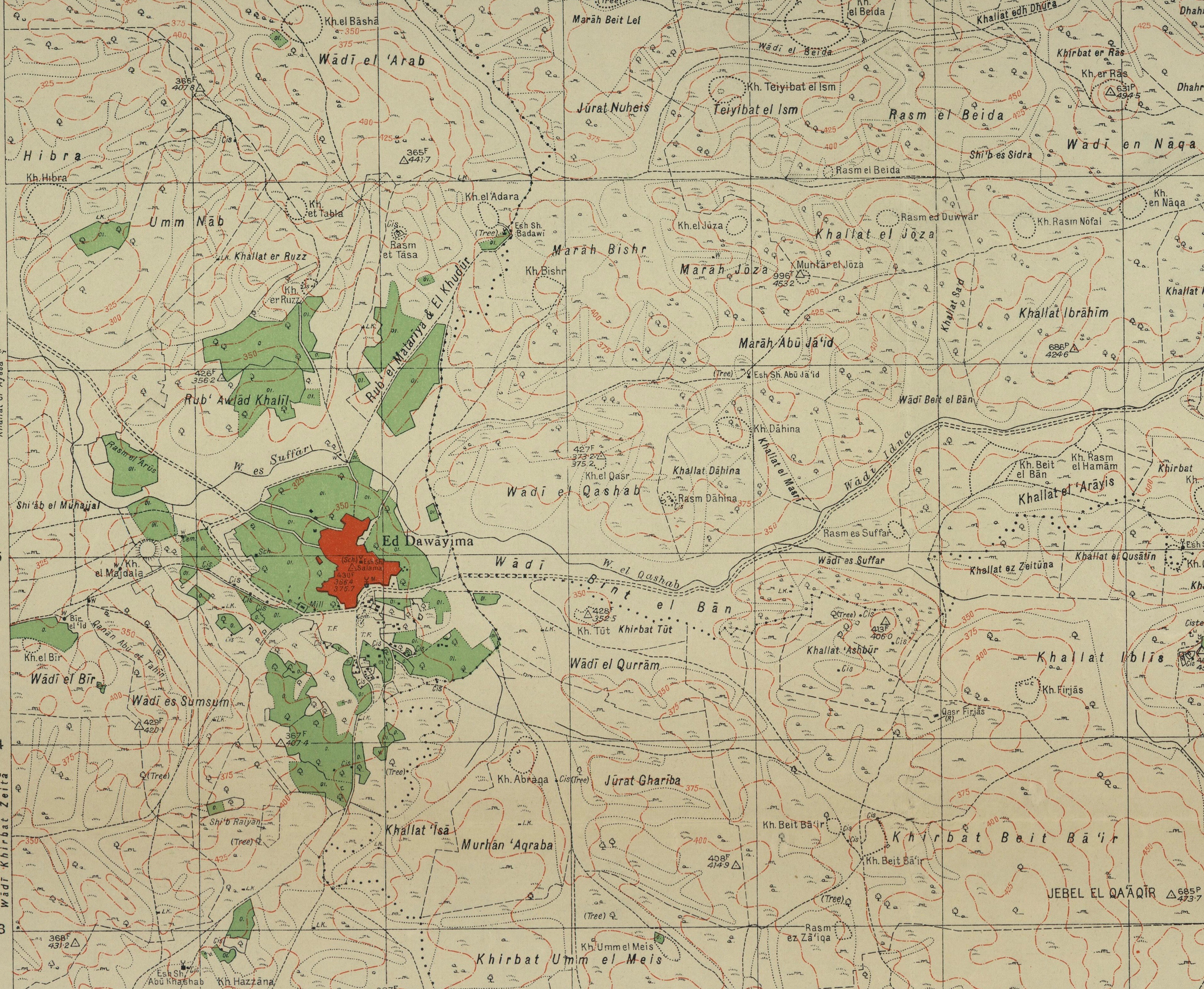
Al-Dawayima 1933

Prior to the attack the village had a population of 6,000, with some 4,000 of that number being recently displaced refugees. The Haganah intelligence service (HIS) considered the village to be 'very friendly'. Dawayima was situated a few kilometres west of Hebron.

Historian Michael Palumbo wrote that the 89th Commando Battalion was "composed of former Irgun and Stern Gang terrorists." (Note: Michael Palumbo, 1987, The Palestinian Catastrophe: The 1948 Expulsion of a People from Their Homeland. "This town was taken by a company of the 89th Commando Battalion which was composed of former Irgun and Stern Gang terrorists.")

== Massacre ==
=== The village mukhtar's account ===
According to the village headman, Hassan Mahmoud Ihdeib, half an hour after midday prayers, the village was approached by three groups of troops, from the West, North and South: 20 armoured cars on the Qubeiba-Dawaymeh road, a second group along the Beit Jibrin-Dawaymeh road, and another set of armoured cars approaching from Mafkhar-Dawaymeh. He stated that no call to surrender was announced, and that no resistance took place. Firing began at a distance of 1/2 kilometer as the semi-circular arc of forces closed in. The Israeli troops fired indiscriminately for over an hour, during which time many fled, and two Palestinian groups took refuge respectively in the Mosque and a nearby cave called Iraq El Zagh. On returning the day with other villagers, 60 bodies were found in the mosque, mostly of elderly men. Numerous corpses of men, women and children, lay in the streets. 80 bodies of men, women and children were then found in the entrance of the Iraq El Zagh cavern. On making a census, it emerged that 455 persons were missing, 280 men, and the remainder women and children.

=== The event according to Benny Morris ===
Ben-Gurion, quoting General Avner, briefly referred in his war diary to the 'rumours' that the army had 'slaughtered 70–80 persons.' One version of what happened was provided by an Israeli soldier to a Mapam member, who transmitted the information to Eliezer Peri, the editor of the party daily Al HaMishmar and a member of the party's Political Committee. The party member, Sh. (possibly Shabtai) Kaplan, described the witness as 'one of our people, an intellectual, 100 percent reliable.' The village, wrote Kaplan, had been held by Arab 'irregulars' and was captured by the 89th Battalion without a fight. 'The first [wave] of conquerors killed about 80 to 100 men, women, and children. The children they killed by breaking their heads with sticks. There was not a house without dead,' wrote Kaplan. Kaplan's informant, who arrived immediately afterwards in the second wave, reported that Arab men and women who remained were then shut away in houses 'without food or water.' Sappers arrived to blow up the houses.

One commander ordered a sapper to put two old women in a certain house ... and to blow up the house with them. The sapper refused ... The commander then ordered his men to put the old women in the house and the evil deed was done. One soldier boasted that he had raped a woman and then shot her. One woman, with a newborn baby in her arms, was employed to clean the courtyard where the soldiers ate. She worked a day or two. In the end they shot her and her baby.

The letter by Kaplan was published in full in Haaretz in February 2016. The original of the letter was removed from the archive where it has previously been available.

Benny Morris writes:

According to one 89th Battalion veteran, Avraham Vered, the village houses “were filled with the loot of the Etzion Bloc [i.e. Kfar Etzion massacre]. The Jewish fighters who attacked Dawayima knew that … the blood of those slaughtered cries out for revenge; and that the men of Dawayima were among those who took part in the massacre." Avraham Vered added another motive for revenge, the fact that the village was in the Hebron hills, some of whose villagers had been responsible for the 1929 Hebron massacre.

The soldier-witness, according to Kaplan, said

cultured officers ... had turned into base murderers and this not in the heat of battle ... but out of a system of expulsion and destruction. The less Arabs remained—the better. This principle is the political motor for the expulsions and the atrocities.

From the sworn Statement given by the Mukhtar of Dawaymeh village, Hassan Mahmaod Ihdeib.

Hassan Mahmaod Ihdeib reported that half an hour after the midday prayer on Friday, 28 October 1948, Hassan heard the sound of shooting from the Western side of the village, On investigation, Hassan observed a troop of some twenty armoured car approaching the village on the Qubeiba – Dawaymeh road and a second troop approaching along the Bayt Jibrin–Dawaymeh road and other armoured vehicles approaching from the direction of Mafkhar-Dawaymeh. The village had only twenty guards, They were posted on the Western side of the village, When the armoured cars were within half a kilometre from the village, they opened fire from automatic weapons and mortars and advanced on the village in a semi-circular movement, thereby surrounding the village on the Western, Northern and Southern sides, A section of the armoured cars entered the village with automatic weapons blazing — Jewish troops jumped put of the armoured cars and spread out through the streets of the village firing promiscuously at anything they saw. The villagers began to flee the village while the older ones took shelter in the Mosque and others in a nearby cave called Iraq El Zagh. The shooting continued for about an hour. The following day, the Mukhtar met with the villagers and agreed to return to the village that night to find out the fate of those that had stayed behind. He reports that in the Mosque there were the bodies of some sixty persons, most of them were, men of advanced age who had taken shelter in the Mosque. His father was among them, He saw a large number of bodies in the streets, bodies of men, women and children, He then went to the Cave of Iraq El Zagh, He found at the mouth of the cave the bodies of eighty five persons, again men, women and children, The Mukhtar then carried out a census of the inhabitants of the village and found that a total of 455 persons was missing of whom 280 were men and the rest women and children, There were other casualties among the refugees, the number of which the Mukhtar was unable to determine, The Mukhtar explicitly states that the village had not been called upon to surrender and that the Jewish troops had not met with any resistance.

Morris has estimated "hundreds" of people were killed, he also reports on the IDF investigation, which concluded around 100 villagers had been killed, and cites an account by a Mapam member, based on an interview with an Israeli soldier, who reported 80 to 100 men, women and children killed.

According to a February 26, 2026 Haaretz investigation, filmmaker Neta Shoshani presented testimony in her film concerning the massacre at al-Dawayima in the Lachish region, describing it as material that had drawn historians’ attention in the past but was later concealed by the Defense Ministry’s security body (MALMAB). The report cites a letter from a Mapam member identified as “S. Kaplan” to Al HaMishmar editor Eliezer Peri, relaying an alleged eyewitness account attributed to a soldier named Meir Efron. In the letter, Kaplan wrote that Efron arrived in the village immediately after its capture, that there had been no battle or resistance, and that the first troops killed “80 to 100” Arabs, including women and children. The letter further reveals that a commander ordered two elderly Arab women to be placed in a house and blown up, that a soldier boasted of raping an Arab woman and then shooting her, and that an Arab woman holding a newborn was employed for cleaning for a day or two before she and the infant were shot.

=== Further details ===
Ilan Pappe states that the village was guarded by 20 men who were paralysed by fright when they saw the Israeli troops, and that the semi-circular pincer movement was designed to allow the 6,000 residents the possibility of fleeing eastwards. The massacre took place when the expected wave of flight failed to take place. He also adds that Amos Kenan took part in the assault.

Saleh Abdel Jawad estimates the total deaths were "between 100 and 200".

== Aftermath ==
=== UN inspection team ===
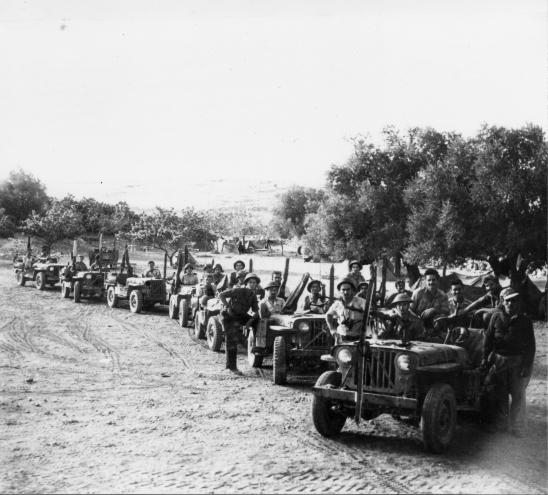
Members of the 89th Battalion outside Beit Guvrin, during Operation Yoav, October 1948

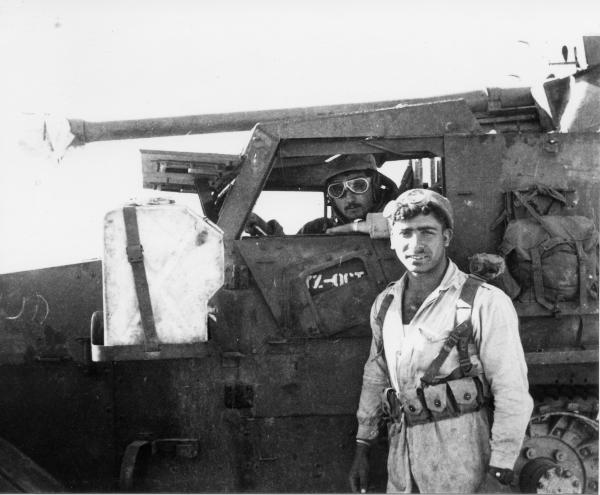
Members of the 89th Battalion during Operation Yoav, October 1948

Yigal Allon cabled Général Yitzhak Sadeh to check "the 'rumours' that the 89th Battalion had 'killed many tens of prisoners on the day of the conquest of al-Dawayima', and to respond". On the 5 November, probably worried about a UN investigation, Allon then ordered Sadeh to instruct the unit:

that is accused of murdering Arab civilians at Dawayima to go to the village and bury with their own hands the corpses of those murdered.

Although unbeknownst to Allon, the 89th had cleaned up the site of the massacre on 1 November 1948.

On 7 November, UN inspectors visited the scene of the village to investigate accusations of a massacre, the accusation being made by the Egyptians and refugees from the village. The team found "several demolished buildings and one corpse but no other physical evidence of a massacre". The UN team did however take a witness statement from the village mukhtar.

In a November 8, 1948, letter to Alexander Cadogan of the United Kingdom, as then-president of the UN Security Council, the Israeli government denied any massacre had occurred in the village. Aubrey S. Eban, Israel's representative at the United Nations, claimed Al-Dawayima "had been completely abandoned by its civilian population before it was occupied by Israeli forces in the operations which followed the Egyptian truce violation on October 14th." Eban further claimed none of the "atrocity stories" reported by the Arab League concerning Israeli conduct "has proved to have had the least substance or foundation."

Isser Be'eri, the commander of the IDF intelligence service, who conducted an independent investigation, concluded that 80 people had been killed during the occupation of Al-Dawayima and that 22 had been captured and executed subsequently. Be'eri recommended prosecution of the platoon OC, who had confessed to the massacre, but notwithstanding his recommendations no one was put on trial or punished.

On 14 November the Israeli cabinet instructed Prime Minister David Ben-Gurion to also launch an investigation. Its findings remain secret.

=== Reactions ===
The American consul in Jerusalem, William Burdett, who had received news about the massacre reported on November 16 to Washington "Investigation by UN indicates massacre occurred but observers are unable to determine number of persons involved."

News of the massacre reached village communities in the western Hebron and Judean foothills "possibly precipitating further flight".

However,

The reason why so little is known about this massacre which, in many respects, was more brutal than the Deir Yassin massacre, is because the Arab Legion feared that if the news was allowed to spread, it would have the same effect on the morale of the peasantry that Deir Yassin had, namely to cause another flow of Arab refugees.

== See also ==
- Killings and massacres during the 1948 Palestine war
- 1948 Palestinian expulsion and flight

== Bibliography ==
- Benvenisti, Meron (2002). Sacred Landscape: The Buried History of the Holy Land Since 1948. University of California Press. ISBN 0-520-23422-7
- Morris, Benny (2004). The Birth of the Palestinian Refugee Problem Revisited. Cambridge: Cambridge University Press. ISBN 0-521-00967-7
- Khalidi, Walid (1991). "ALL THAT REMAINS: The Palestinian Villages Occupied and Depopulated by Israel in 1948", The Institute of Palestine Studies, Washington, D.C. ISBN 0-88728-224-5
