= Yitzhak Zamir =

- יצחק זמיר
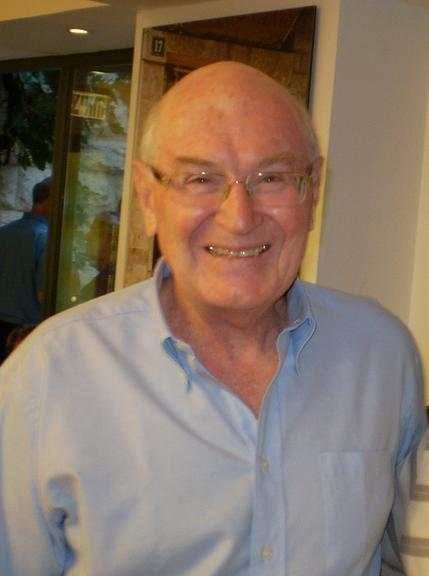
- Yitzhak Zamir

Attorney General of Israel
- In office 1978–1986
- Preceded by: Aharon Barak
- Succeeded by: Yosef Harish

Justice of the Supreme Court of Israel
- In office 1994–2001

Personal details
- Born: April 15, 1931 (age 95) Warsaw, Poland
- Relations: Asaf Zamir (nephew)
- Education: Hebrew University of Jerusalem, University of London
- Occupation: Jurist
- Known for: Investigating the GSS during the Kav 300 affair, Dean of the Hebrew University and University of Haifa Law Faculties
- Awards: Tzeltner's Award for the research of law, Emil Grunzweig Human Rights Award, Israel Prize for law, Emet Prize for excellence in law

Yitzhak Zamir (Hebrew: יצחק זמיר; born April 15, 1931) is a professor of public law and Dean of the Hebrew University of Jerusalem's Faculty of Law, a former Attorney General of Israel, first Dean of the University of Haifa's Law Faculty, and a former Judge of the Supreme Court of Israel.

== Biography ==
Zamir was born in Warsaw in Poland on April 15, 1931, and immigrated with his parents to Palestine at the age of three. Zamir was educated in Herzliya before serving in the Israeli Air Force. When finishing his military service, Zamir went to study economics and political science. Later Zamir changed his major to law at the Hebrew University. Zamir did his internship at the Supreme Court under the supervision of Justice Yoel Zussman (later Chief Justice). In 1959 Zamir received his license to practice law. Zamir received his doctorate certificate from the University of London.

Zamir taught public law at the Hebrew University, becoming dean of the law faculty in the years 1975–1978.

From 1978 to 1986 Zamir served as the Israeli Attorney General. During this period, Zamir is remembered for his fight to investigate the GSS during the Kav 300 affair, after two terrorists caught alive were secretly murdered by GSS officer Ehud Yatom (brother of Danny Yatom). Zamir demanded from Moshe Arens, then Minister of Defense, to appoint a committee to investigate the accusations. On May 18, 1986, Zamir demanded to prosecute Avraham Shalom, head of the GSS. Prime Minister Shimon Peres refused and removed Zamir from office, replacing him with Joseph Harish.

In the Years 1988-1991 Zamir was president of the Journalist Council. In December 1991, Zamir quit his job claiming that he is not trusted and has not authority, as he had no power to place sanctions over journalists who broke the ethical code.

In 1991 Zamir was appointed as the first Dean of the newly established Faculty of Law in the University of Haifa, and served there until 1994.

In 1994 he was appointed as a Supreme Court Judge until the year 2001, when reached the age of 70.

In 2001 he was head of the Jerusalem Center for Ethics, and between 2003 and 2007 was head of the committee in charge of creating ethical rules for the Knesset members.

He is the uncle of Asaf Zamir, Israeli politician and diplomat.

== Awards ==
- In 1986, Zamir was awarded the Tzeltner's Award for the research of law.
- In 1986, he received the Emil Grunzweig Human Rights Award.
- In 1997, he was awarded the Israel Prize for law (1997).
- In 2014, he was awarded the Emet Prize for excellence in law.

== See also ==
- List of Israel Prize recipients
