= Qaddita =

Qaddita قدّيتا Kaditta
- Village
- Etymology: from personal name
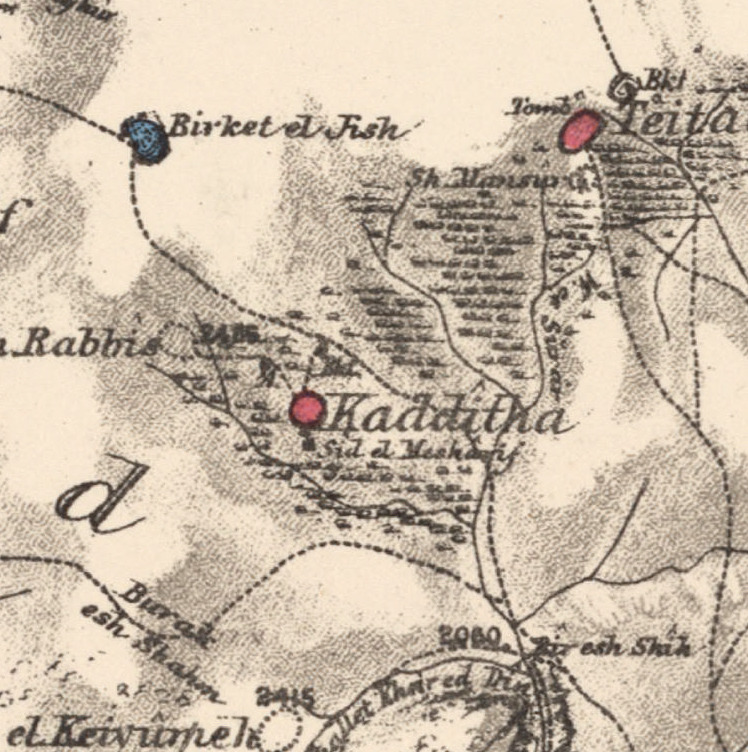
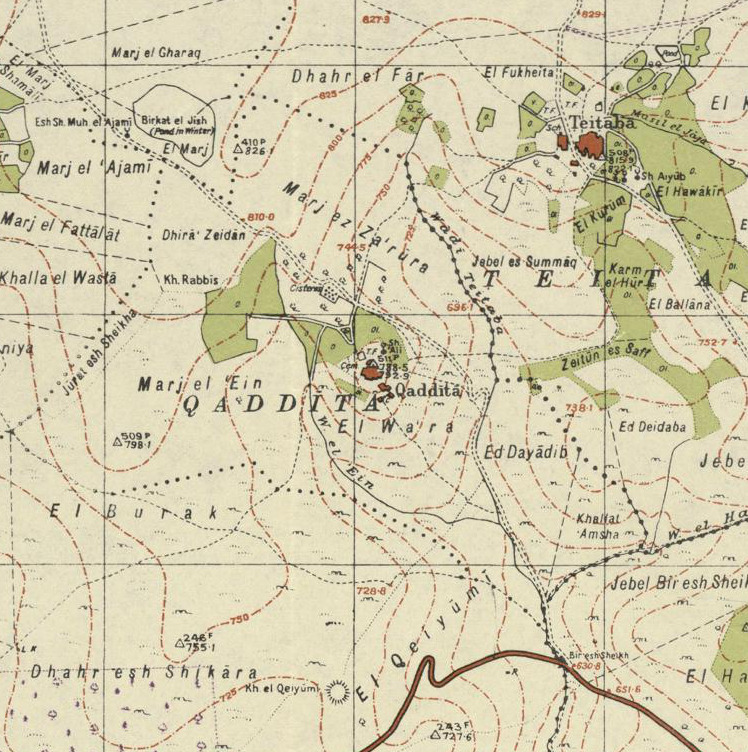
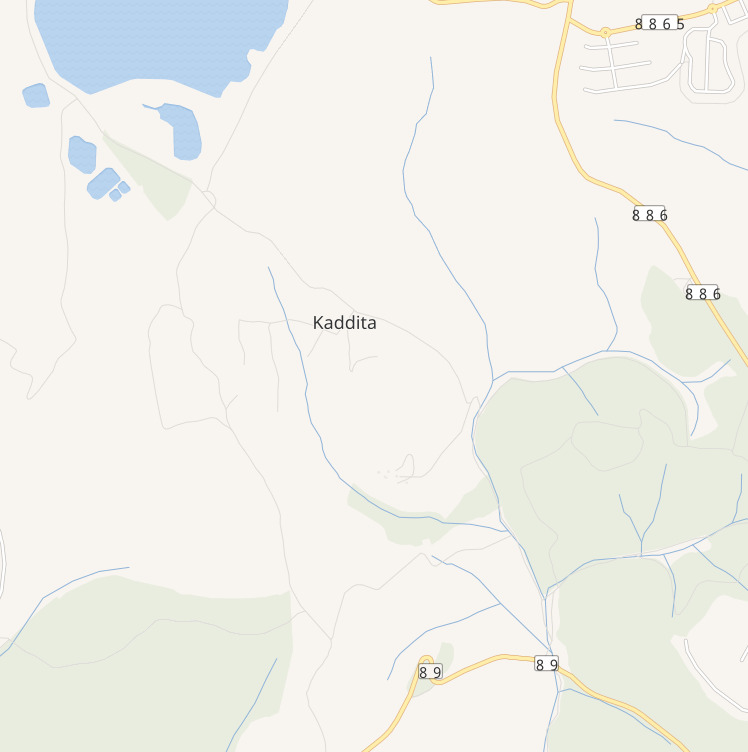
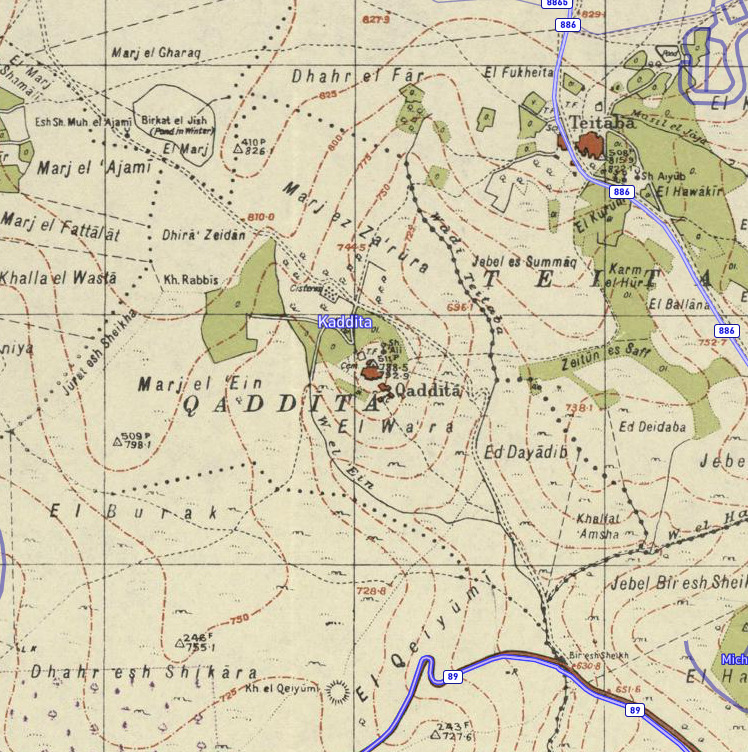
- 1870s map 1940s map modern map 1940s with modern overlay map A series of historical maps of the area around Qaddita (click the buttons)

- Location within Mandatory Palestine
- Coordinates: 33°00′17″N 35°28′5″E
- Palestine grid: 194/267
- Geopolitical entity: Mandatory Palestine
- Subdistrict: Safad
- Date of depopulation: May 11, 1948

Area
  - Total: 2,441 dunams (2.441 km^{2}; 0.942 sq mi)

Population (1945)
  - Total: 240
- Cause(s) of depopulation: Influence of nearby town's fall
- Current Localities: Kadita

Qaddita (Arabic: قدّيتا, transliteration: Qaddîtâ) was a Muslim Arab village of 240, located 4.5 kilometers (2.8 mi) northwest of Safad. It was captured and depopulated in the 1948 Arab-Israeli War, with some of its inhabitants expelled or fleeing to nearby 'Akbara where they live as internally displaced persons and others to refugee camps in Lebanon or Syria.

== History ==
It is possible that the name "Qaddita" is an Arabic distortion of the Aramaic word kaddish.

=== Ottoman era ===
Qaddita was under the Ottoman Empire in 1517, and by 1596 it was administrated by the nahiya ("subdistrict") of Jira, part of Sanjak Safad. The population was 27 households, an estimated 149 inhabitants, all Muslims. They paid a fixed tax rate of 25% on wheat, barley, vineyards, beehives, and goats; a total of 4,030 akçe.

The village appeared under the name of Kadis on the map that Pierre Jacotin compiled during Napoleon's invasion of 1799.

The village was reported to be totally destroyed in the devastating Galilee earthquake of 1837. In 1838, Robinson noted: "Kadita has many vineyards and fig trees in its neighbourhood, and was greatly injured by the earthquake". He also noted it as a village located in the Safad district.

In 1875, Victor Guérin found "only ten houses, inhabited by as many Moslem families. Cisterns cut in the rock prove that it is the site of an ancient place."

In 1881, the PEF's Survey of Western Palestine (SWP) described Kadditha: "a mud and stone village, containing about 200 Muslems, situated on the slope of a hill, with gardens of figs. There is a birket and spring."

A population list from about 1887 showed Kadditha to have about 315 inhabitants; all Muslims.

=== British Mandate era ===
Under the rule of the British Mandate in Palestine, Qaddita expanded north and south, its houses were clustered together, and built of stone. In the 1922 census of Palestine, Qaddita had a population of 110; all Muslims, increasing in the 1931 census to 170, still all Muslims, in a total of 32 houses.

Its economy was based on animal husbandry and crop cultivation, mainly grains, figs, pomegranates, and grapes as well as olives which by 1943 covered 77 dunams. In the 1945 statistics the population was 240 Muslims, and the total land area was 2,441 dunums; Of this, 150 dunums was plantations and irrigable land, 1,452 cereals, while 31 dunams were built-up (urban) land.

=== 1948, and after ===
Like many other Arab villages in the eastern Galilee, Qaddita was evacuated a day after Safad fell to the Jewish forces during Operation Yiftach on May 10. Some villagers were evicted to the village of Akbara, south of Safad, where they, according to Walid Khalidi, lived under harrowing circumstances. No Jewish towns were built on village lands. Khalidi describes the remains of the village being "tombs from the cemetery and stone rubble from the destroyed homes".

== See also ==
- Kadita
- Hamaam

== Bibliography ==
- Barron, J. B., ed. (1923). Palestine: Report and General Abstracts of the Census of 1922. Government of Palestine.
- Conder, C.R.; Kitchener, H.H. (1881). The Survey of Western Palestine: Memoirs of the Topography, Orography, Hydrography, and Archaeology. Vol. 1. London: Committee of the Palestine Exploration Fund.
- Department of Statistics (1945). Village Statistics, April, 1945. Government of Palestine.
- Guérin, V. (1880). Description Géographique Historique et Archéologique de la Palestine (in French). Vol. 3: Galilee, pt. 2. Paris: L'Imprimerie Nationale.
- Hadawi, S. (1970). Village Statistics of 1945: A Classification of Land and Area ownership in Palestine. Palestine Liberation Organization Research Centre.
- Hütteroth, W.-D.; Abdulfattah, K. (1977). Historical Geography of Palestine, Transjordan and Southern Syria in the Late 16th Century. Erlanger Geographische Arbeiten, Sonderband 5. Erlangen, Germany: Vorstand der Fränkischen Geographischen Gesellschaft. ISBN 3-920405-41-2.
- Karmon, Y. (1960). "An Analysis of Jacotin's Map of Palestine" (PDF). Israel Exploration Journal. 10 (3, 4): 155–173, 244–253. Archived from the original (PDF) on 2019-12-22.
- Khalidi, W. (1992). All That Remains: The Palestinian Villages Occupied and Depopulated by Israel in 1948. Washington D.C.: Institute for Palestine Studies. ISBN 0-88728-224-5.
- Mills, E., ed. (1932). Census of Palestine 1931. Population of Villages, Towns and Administrative Areas. Jerusalem: Government of Palestine.
- Morris, B. (2004). The Birth of the Palestinian Refugee Problem Revisited. Cambridge University Press. ISBN 978-0-521-00967-6.
- Palmer, E. H. (1881). The Survey of Western Palestine: Arabic and English Name Lists Collected During the Survey by Lieutenants Conder and Kitchener, R. E. Transliterated and Explained by E.H. Palmer. Committee of the Palestine Exploration Fund.
- Robinson, E.; Smith, E. (1841). Biblical Researches in Palestine, Mount Sinai and Arabia Petraea: A Journal of Travels in the year 1838. Vol. 3. Boston: Crocker & Brewster.
- Rhode, H. (1979). Administration and Population of the Sancak of Safed in the Sixteenth Century. Columbia University. Archived from the original on 2020-03-01.
- Schumacher, G. (1888). "Population list of the Liwa of Akka". Quarterly Statement - Palestine Exploration Fund. 20: 169–191.
