= Moshe Ben-Ze'ev =

Israeli jurist

- משה בן זאב

Attorney General of Israel
- In office 1963–1968
- Preceded by: Gideon Hausner
- Succeeded by: Meir Shamgar

Personal details
- Born: 8 December 1911; Luninets, Russian Empire
- Died: 25 June 1995 (aged 83); Jerusalem, Israel

Moshe Ben-Ze'ev (Hebrew: משה בן זאב; 8 December 1911 – 25 June 1995) was an Israeli jurist who served as Attorney General between 1963 and 1968.

== Legal career ==
Ben-Ze'ev was born in 1911 in Luninets in the Russian Empire (now in Belarus). He emigrated to Mandatory Palestine in 1935.

In the 1950s he worked as a judge in a Haifa District court and had close ties with the ruling Mapai party. In early 1963 he replaced Gideon Hausner as Attorney General after Hausner resigned to enter politics.

After concluding his term as Attorney General, Ben-Ze'ev opened a private practice with Aryeh Kamar. In 1980 he headed a commission to investigate abuse of civil servants who had exposed corruption.

Ben-Ze'ev died in Jerusalem in June 1995 and was buried at the Mount of Beatitudes.
