= Kadita =

Ecological village in northern Israel

Kadita: כדיתה (Hebrew)
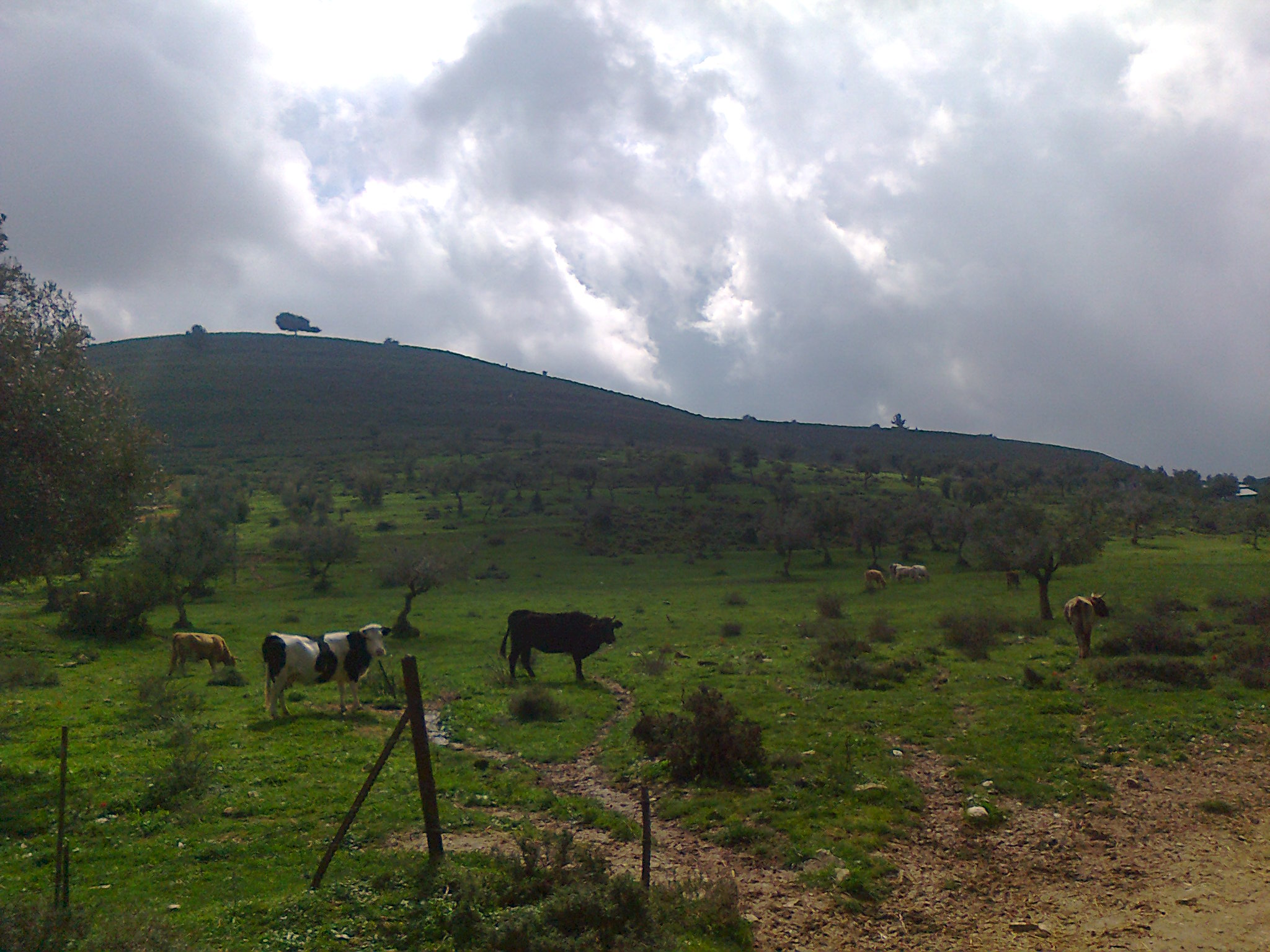

- Location within Northeast Israel Location within Israel
- Coordinates: 33°00′18″N 35°27′50″E
- Country: Israel
- District: Northern
- Subdistrict: Safed
- Council: Merom HaGalil
- Affiliation: Agricultural Union
- Founded: 1991
- Population (2024): 191

Kadita (Hebrew: כדיתה) is an unrecognised community settlement in northern Israel. Located in the Upper Galilee, it falls under the jurisdiction of Merom HaGalil Regional Council. In 2024 it had a population of 191.

== History ==
In 1988 four families received land from the Israel Land Administration in return for giving up their land on Mount Meron. The site had previously been the Arab village of Qaddita, whose residents fled during the 1948 Arab–Israeli War. Rabbi Tarfon was buried in the area.

In 1991 an association was formed to build an ecovillage at the site, and received the support of Housing Minister Ariel Sharon. Twenty families settled on the land and temporary homes were built. Another 14 families arrived in 2000. However, the Israel Land Administration viewed the residents as squatters, issued evacuation orders and demolished temporary buildings on several occasions.
