= The Schapera inquiry =

1948 Israeli government inquiry

The Shapira inquiry, November 1948, was an internal Israeli government inquiry following reports that the IDF had harmed civilians during military operations in Galilee and the South.

== Background ==
In the Autumn of 1948 the Israeli army launched two major offensives, Operation Hiram in the Galilee and Operation Yoav in the South. On 29 October David Ben-Gurion wrote in his diary that there were rumors of 70–80 people being "slaughtered" by the army. On 3 November Yigal Allon ordered OC of the 8th Brigade, General Yitzhak Sadeh, to investigate reports that the 89th Battalion had killed "many tens" of prisoners at Al-Dawayima.

On 7 November the Cabinet appointed a three-man committee of inquiry: Labour and Construction Minister Mordechai Bentov (Mapam), Justice Minister Felix Rosenblüth (Progressive Party), Immigration and Health Minister Hayim Moshe Shapira (Hamizzrahi – National Religious Party).

On 8 November Eliezer Pra'i, a newspaper editor, received a letter describing the same event which he passed onto Aharon Cohen, a senior member of Mapam, one of the junior partners in the Provisional Government.

At a cabinet meeting on 14 November the committee, having encountered a lack of cooperation from the army, asked for more powers. This was rejected by the cabinet and Shapira resigned. Ben-Gurion then proposed, under threat of his resignation, a one-man investigation. The cabinet voted that "the Prime Minister investigates the charges concerning the army's behavior towards Arabs in Galilee and the South." Ben-Gurion appointed Attorney-General Ya'akov Shimshon Shapira to head the investigation, staffed by three army officers.

Shapira's instructions were:

"You are requested herein ... to investigate if there were attacks by ... the army on Arab inhabitants in the Galilee and the South, not in conformity with the accepted rules of war ... What were the attacks ...? To what degree was the army command, low and high, responsible for these acts, and to what degree was the existing discipline in the army responsible for this and what should be done to rectify matters and to punish the guilty?"

== The findings ==
The inquiry's findings remain classified.
