= Attorney General of Israel =

Chief legal officer of the State of Israel

Attorney General
- היועץ המשפטי לממשלה; Hayoetz Hamishpati Lamemshala

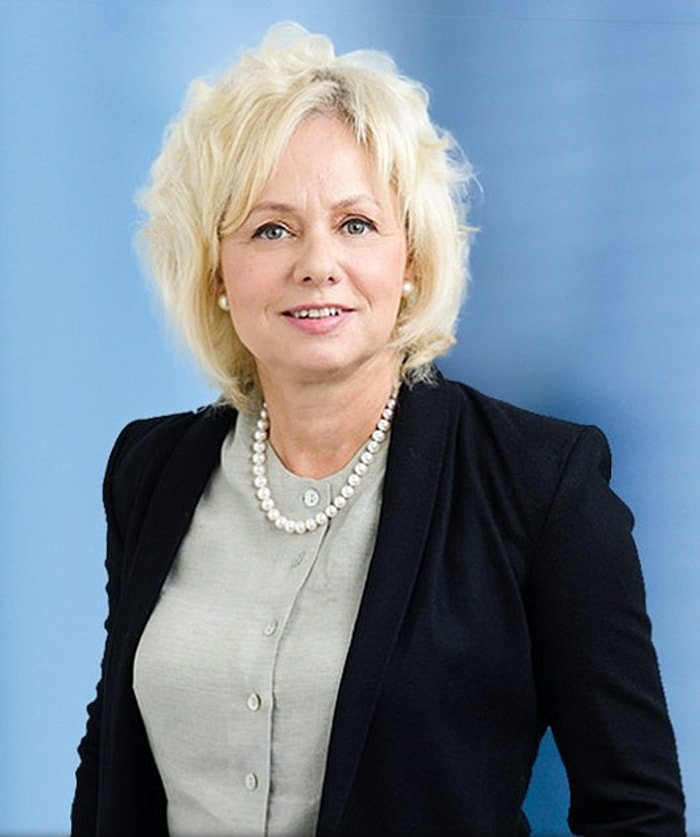
- Incumbent; Gali Baharav-Miara since 7 February 2022
- Appointer: Cabinet of Israel
- Term length: Six years, single term
- Inaugural holder: Ya'akov Shimshon Shapira
- Formation: 1948
- Website: http://www.justice.gov.il

The attorney general of Israel (Hebrew: היועץ המשפטי לממשלה, Ha-Yo'etz Ha-Mishpati La-Memshala, lit. 'Legal Advisor to the Government') heads the legal system of the executive branch and the public prosecution of the state. The attorney general advises the government on legal matters, represents state authorities in court, advises on the preparation of legal memoranda for the government in general and the justice minister in particular. Likewise they examine and advise upon private member's bills in the Knesset.

Additionally, the attorney general is tasked with protecting the rule of law and, as such, entrusted with protecting the public interest from possible harm by government authorities. It is an independent appointed position, one of the most important and influential in Israeli democracy, and a central institution in the framework of the Israeli legal system. Owing to the common law tradition of the Israeli legal system, the duties of the attorney general are not codified in law and have arisen from precedent and tradition over the years. In February 2022, lawyer Gali Baharav-Miara received unanimous backing from the cabinet to become the first-ever female attorney general.

== Duties ==
The attorney general has four main duties:

1. Head of the public prosecution system
2. Representative of the state in all legal proceedings
3. Chief legal counsel to the government
4. Representative of the public interest in any legal matter

== History ==
In 1997 a commission in the chairmanship of the former president of the Israeli Supreme Court, Meir Shamgar, had been established for examination of the possibilities of the future legislation on the subject of the attorney general, and recommended that the official title of his or her position will be changed from "the legal adviser to the government" to "the chief legal adviser" to reflect his responsibility for ensuring the rule of law in all of the arms of government, and not only as an adviser to the government itself in matters of law. Likewise the commission recommended that the adviser will be appointed by the government according to the recommendations of a public commission, that will include five members: a retired judge of the supreme court, a former justice minister or attorney general, a Knesset member who will be chosen by the Constitutional Affairs committee of the Knesset, an attorney who will be chosen by the national council of the Israel Bar Association, and a legal expert in the subjects of civil and criminal law who will be chosen by the heads of the university law schools in Israel—in order to ensure the choosing of an appropriate person who possesses the fitting qualifications for the job. This recommendation regarding the selection committee was adopted in August 2000, but the recommendation regarding the title of the position was not adopted.

It is customary that the decision whom to select for the legal adviser position out of the list of nominees that the public commission recommended is done by the justice minister whose selection is brought to the approval of the government, which usually approves the appointment.

The manner in which the Attorney General carries out the duties assigned to his or her position is derived to a large extent from the personality of the person holding the position. Two of the legal advisers, Aharon Barak and Yitzhak Zamir, who came to the position from academia, were distinguished in the decisiveness that they demonstrated for the guarding of the rule of law in Israel, even when their ideas conflicted with those of the government.

== Deputy positions ==
- Deputy Attorney General for consultation
- Deputy Attorney General for legislation
- Deputy Attorney General for Hebrew (i.e., Jewish) law
- Deputy Attorney General for special assignments
- Deputy Attorney General for civil matters
- Deputy Attorney General for criminal matters
- Deputy Attorney General for fiscal-economic matters

== List of attorneys general ==
Name	Term
Ya'akov Shimshon Shapira	1948–1950
Haim Cohn	1950–1960
Gideon Hausner	1960–1963
Moshe Ben-Ze'ev	1963–1968
Meir Shamgar	1968–1975
Aharon Barak	1975–1978
Yitzhak Zamir	1978–1986
Yosef Harish	1986–1993
Michael Ben-Yair	1993–1997
Roni Bar-On	1997
Elyakim Rubinstein	1997–2004
Menachem Mazuz	2004–2010
Yehuda Weinstein	2010–2016
Avichai Mandelblit	2016–2022
Gali Baharav-Miara	2022–

Comparison with government legal advisors in other countries

The position of binding advice and representational monopoly in Israel is exceptional and even unique by global standards. According to Eitan Levontin, the legal situation in Israel is not a minority opinion, but rather a single opinion.
