= Abdallah al-Asbah =

Palestinian rebel commander (1910–1938)

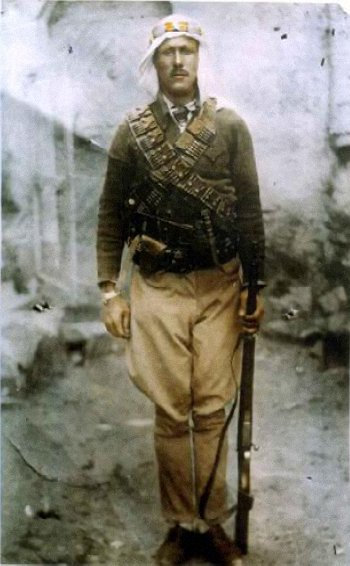
- Portrait of al-Asbah
- Born: 1910; Al-Ja'una, Beirut Vilayet, Ottoman Empire
- Died: March or April 1938 (aged 27–28); Sa'sa' area, Mandatory Palestine
- Other names: Abu al-Abed
- Known for: Local Commander in the 1936–39 Palestine revolt

Abdallah al-Asbah (Arabic: عبد الله الأصبح; 1910 – March/April 1938), also known as Abu al-Abed (أبو العبد), was a Palestinian rebel commander who participated in the 1936–1939 Arab revolt in Palestine. He was killed by British forces near the border with Lebanon. He was born in the village of al-Ja'una near Safad.

== Commander in 1936–39 revolt ==
Al-Asbah was a disciple of Izz ad-Din al-Qassam, a Muslim reformist preacher and anti-colonialist activist. During the 1936–39 revolt in Palestine, al-Asbah led a rebel band of about 15 men who often set up night time checkpoints to ambush British military and Jewish targets before withdrawing to nearby villages and grottoes before the night's end. His rebel band was largely destroyed in a British ambush near the Galilee village of Arraba in mid-1937. Al-Asbah played a key role in reigniting the revolt in late 1937. At that time, he rallied the fellahin (peasants) of the Safad region to fight against the British. Al-Asbah is also known for fighting several battles alongside the Syrian commander Said al-As.

Following a battle in Nabi Yusha', the British Army offered a reward of 1,000 Palestine pounds for Al-Asbah, dead or alive. Around March 1938, the British authorities received information on the location of al-Asbah's hideout and besieged al-Asbah and some of his men at a grotto near the border with Lebanon. After they used up their supplies, the rebels began emerging from the grotto opening fire one by one, all being gunned down by British forces. According to local accounts, al-Asbah was the last rebel killed in this confrontation. He was killed by a shrapnel wound to the head and his body left was on the battlefield for 40 days, with the residents of nearby villages wary of retrieving it and being consequently punished by the authorities. Ultimately, residents from the village of Sa'sa' buried the body in their village and informed his family of his death.

== Commemoration ==
Al-Asbah became a popular figure among the Palestinians of the Galilee following his death for his reputed incorruptibility unlike many other rebel commanders and his refusal to surrender to the British authorities. Local songs were penned for him and were sung at weddings and dabke dances.

Al-Asbah did not have any children. His widow lived in al-Ja'una until the 1948 exodus, when she moved to Yarmouk Camp for Palestinian refugees near Damascus in Syria.

=== List of Battles ===
- Wadi Laymoon Battle (معركة وادي اللیمون)
- Safyieh Battle (معركة الصفیة)
- Jarn Halaweh Battle (معركة جرن حلاوة)
- Wadi Tawahim Battle (معركة وادي الطواحین)
- Al-Nabi Yusha' Battle (معركة النبي یوشع)
- Nweiriyeh Battle (معركة النویریة)
- Jabal Jarmaq Battle (معركة جبل الجرمق)
