= Ya'akov Shimshon Shapira =

Israeli politician (1902–1993)

- יעקב שמשון שפירא
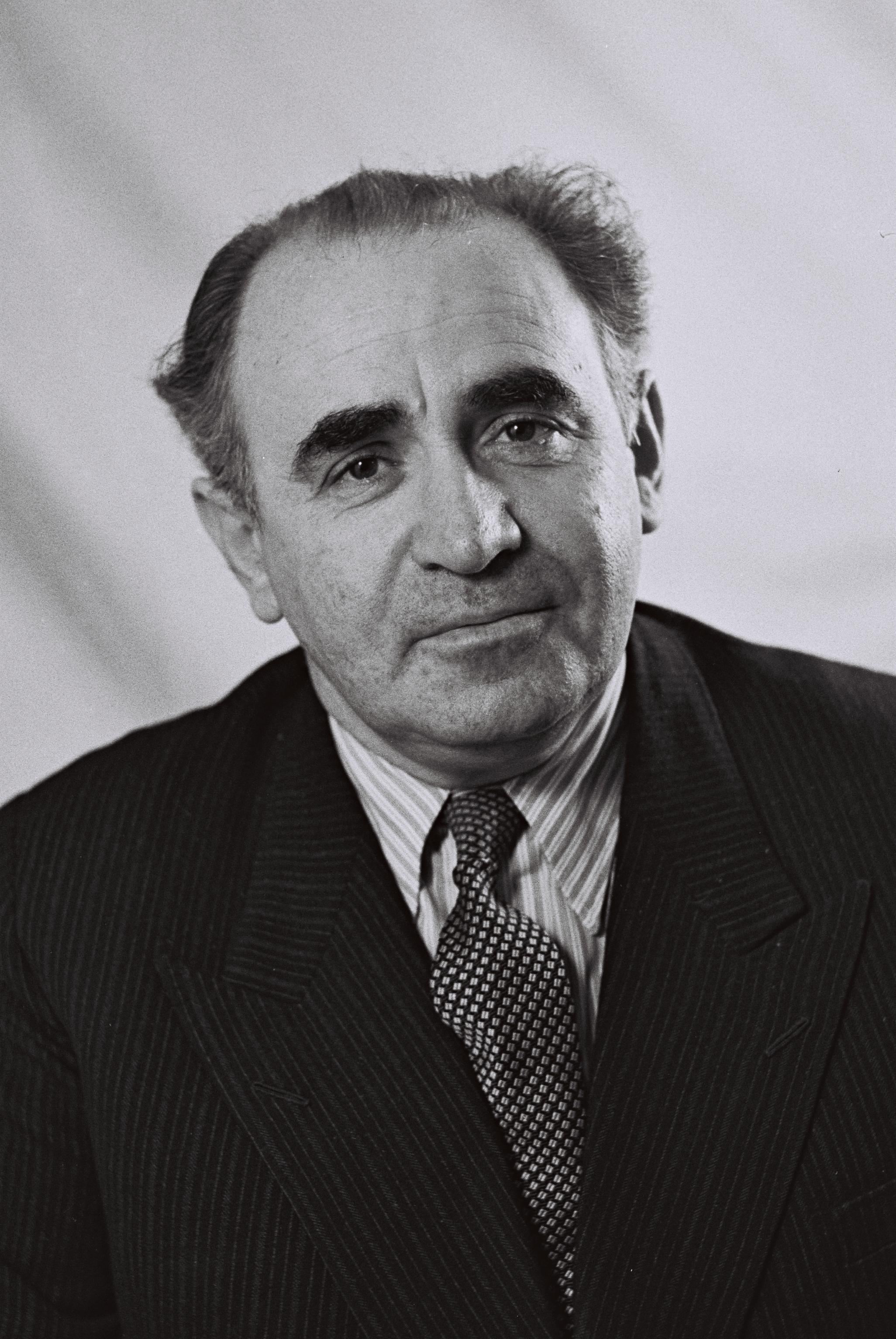

Ministerial roles
- 1966–1972: Minister of Justice
- 1972–1973: Minister of Justice

Faction represented in the Knesset
- 1951–1955: Mapai
- 1969–1974: Alignment

Other roles
- 1948–1950: Attorney General

Personal details
- Born: 4 November 1902 Yelisavetgrad, Russian Empire
- Died: 14 November 1993 (aged 91)

Ya'akov Shimshon Shapira (Hebrew: יעקב שמשון שפירא; 11 April 1902 – 14 November 1993) was an Israeli jurist and Labor Zionist politician.

== Biography ==
Shapira was born in Yelisavetgrad in the Russian Empire (now Kropyvnytskyi, Ukraine) in 1902. He studied in a Yeshiva and later studied medicine at the University of Kharkiv. He was an active Labor Zionist and was incarcerated for his activism from 1923 to 1924. In 1924, he immigrated to the British Mandate of Palestine and joined a "Conquest of Labor" group in Petah Tikva, where he worked as an orchardman. He was one of the founders of kibbutz Giv'at HaShlosha. He was secretary of Ahdut HaAvoda in Jerusalem and a member of the Jerusalem workers' council.

He studied law at the Hebrew University and was certified as a lawyer.

== Legal career ==
In 1934 he moved to Haifa to practice law, and ran an office there until 1948. He represented the Hagana and other groups before the Mandate authorities. After the establishment of the State of Israel he became the Director General of the Justice Ministry, and was Israel's first Attorney General from 1948 to 1950.

In November 1948 he headed an official investigation into allegations of IDF attacks on civilians.

== Political career ==
In 1951, he was elected to the second Knesset for Mapai, and was a member of the House and Constitution, Law and Justice committees. In the third Knesset he was also chairman of the Mapai faction. In 1955, he retired from the Knesset due to allegations that his involvement in the oil business was inappropriate for a workers' party representative. In 1966 to 1973 (except for a short period in 1972 during which he was replaced by Golda Meir), he was Minister of Justice. In 1969, he was elected to the seventh Knesset for the Alignment and was once again a member of the Constitution, Law and Justice committee. As Minister of Justice, he opposed the annexation of East Jerusalem after the Six-Day War, preferring the application of military rule. He also opposed a governmental plan to transfer subject Arabs to other countries, saying: "They are inhabitants of this land, and today you are ruling over it. There is no reason to take Arabs...and transfer them to Iraq". Following the Yom Kippur War, he resigned from the government after his demands to fire Minister of Defense Moshe Dayan were denied.
