= Eliezer Peri =

Israeli politician (1902–1970)

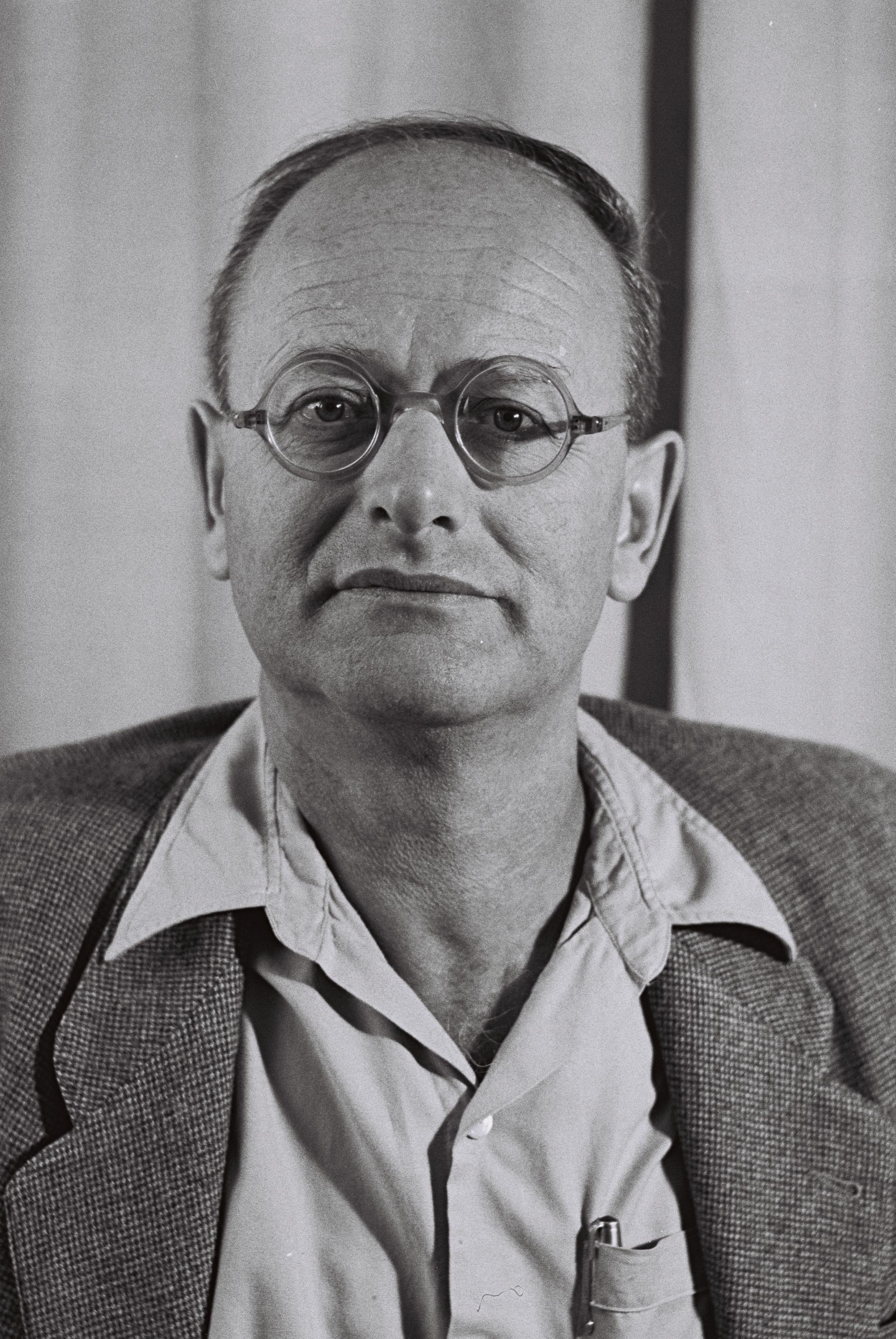
- Peri in 1951

Faction represented in the Knesset
- 1949–1955: Mapam

Personal details
- Born: 2 February 1902 Surochów, Austria-Hungary
- Died: 1 December 1970 (aged 68)

Eliezer Peri (Hebrew: אליעזר פרי; 2 February 1902 – 1 December 1970) was an Israeli politician who served as a member of the Knesset for Mapam between 1949 and 1955.

== Biography ==
Born Eliezer Wilder-Frei in the village of Surochów, near Jarosław, in the Kingdom of Galicia (today in Poland), Peri helped establish a Jewish High School in Lviv, and was one of its first graduates. He joined the Hashomer Hatzair youth group, becoming a member of its leadership and, in 1920, its secretary. Between 1922 and 1925 he studied law and humanities at a teachers' seminary. In 1924 he helped establish the World Federation of Hashomer Hatzair.

In 1926 he emigrated to Mandatory Palestine. In 1929, he became a member of Haifa Workers Council. Amongst the founders of HaKibbutz HaArtzi, he also helped establish kibbutz Merhavia in 1929. In 1930, he started work as an emissary of the Histadrut trade union and Hashomer Hatzair in Europe. Between 1933 and 1949 he served on the Histadrut's council and executive committee.

In 1943 he helped establish the Mishmar newspaper (which later became Al HaMishmar), and was one of its first editors. The following year he became a member of the Assembly of Representatives. In 1948, he helped establish Mapam, and was amongst the party's leadership. On several occasions, as editor of Al HaMishmar, he received letters from soldiers about the Israeli army killing civilians. In early June 1948 he received an account of an old woman and a child being shot; on 8 November he received a detailed description of events at Al Dawayima. This led to the issue being raised in the Mapam Political Committee and from there to the cabinet. The subsequent official inquiry, headed by Shimshon Schapira, remains classified and secret. He was elected to the Knesset on the party's list in 1949, and in August 1949 was involved, for the first time in public, in a short debate about the expulsion of Arabs. He was re-elected in 1951, but lost his seat in the 1955 elections, and in 1969 he left Mapam in protest at its alliance with the Labor Party, joining Ya'akov Riftin's Independent Socialist Zionist Union, which ran unsuccessfully in elections for the Histadrut. He died the following year.
