= Michael Ben-Yair =

Israeli judge

- מיכאל בן יאיר
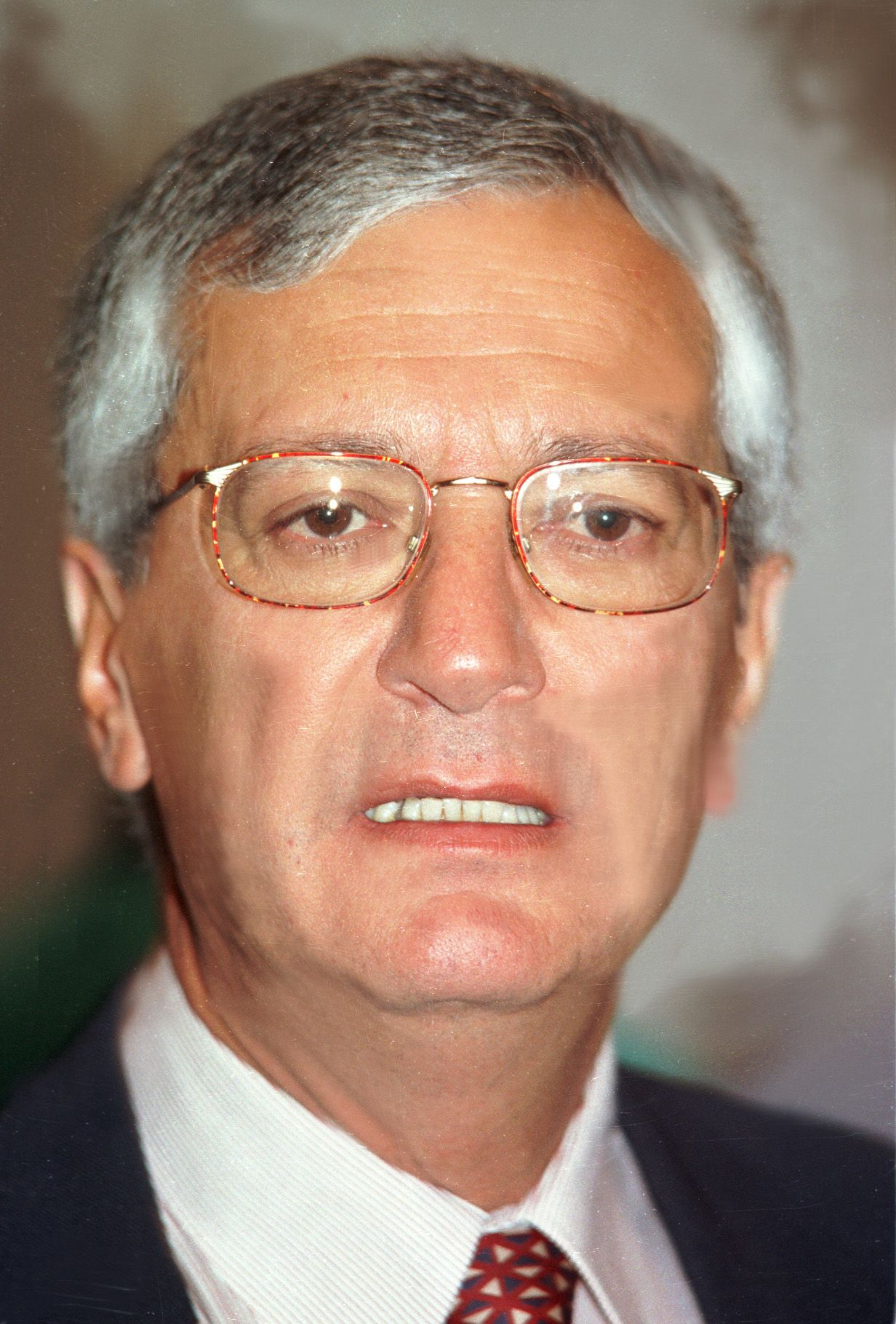

Attorney General of Israel
- In office 1993–1996

Personal details
- Born: 1 September 1942 (age 83) Sheikh Jarrah, Mandatory Palestine
- Occupation: Judge

Michael Ben-Yair (Hebrew: מיכאל בן יאיר; born 1 September 1942) is a former Attorney General of Israel, a position he held from 1993 to 1996, and former acting judge at the Supreme Court of Israel.

== Biography ==
In 1994, while attorney general, Ben-Yair petitioned then Prime Minister Yitzhak Rabin to evict all Jewish settlers living in Hebron, following the attack by Jewish extremist Baruch Goldstein that resulted in 29 deaths and 125 injuries at the Cave of the Patriarchs/Ibrahimi Mosque.

In 2014, Ben-Yair said that Israel had instituted apartheid in the West Bank and called on the European Union to recognize the State of Palestine. In 2019, he co-wrote a letter to The Guardian acknowledging that The UN Independent Commission of Inquiry on the 2018 Gaza protests should be supported in full.

In 2022, Ben-Yair wrote an op-ed in an Irish newspaper agreeing with the then recent Amnesty International report characterizing Israel as an apartheid regime. In 2025, he published a tweet agreeing with the then recent B'Tselem report characterizing Israel as committing genocide in Gaza.

Ben-Yair was raised in Sheikh Jarrah until 1948, where his grandmother, Sarah Jannah, owned a home. In 2019, he discovered that a settler group was charging rent to the Palestinian family that had lived there since the 1960s. For six years, he fought a legal battle to regain ownership and allow the Palestinians to live in the building for a nominal rent. His family successfully regained control in 2025, on the condition that they not sue to recover the rent that was paid.

== See also ==
- Sheikh Jarrah controversy
