= Dorothea Krook-Gilead =

Israeli literary scholar (1920–1989)

- דורותיאה קרוק-גלעד
- Born: Dorothea Krook; 11 February 1920; Riga, Latvia
- Died: 13 November 1989 (aged 69); Ein Harod, Israel
- Citizenship: Latvian, South African, British, Israeli
- Spouse: Zerubavel Gilad
- Awards: Israel Prize

Academic background
- Education: University of Cape Town; Newnham College, Cambridge

Academic work
- Institutions: University of Cambridge; Hebrew University of Jerusalem; Tel Aviv University
- Notable students: Sylvia Plath
- Notable works: Three Traditions of Moral Thought (1959); The Ordeal of Consciousness in Henry James (1962); Elements of Tragedy (1969); John Sergeant and his circle: a study of three seventeenth-century English Aristotelians (1993)

Dorothea Krook-Gilead (Hebrew: דורותיאה קרוק-גלעד; b. 11 February 1920 d. 13 November 1989) was an Israeli literary scholar, translator, and professor of English literature at the University of Cambridge, the Hebrew University of Jerusalem and at Tel Aviv University.

== Biography ==
Krook was born in Riga, Latvia and moved to South Africa at the age of eight. She earned a degree in English literature at the University of Cape Town. In 1946 she was awarded a scholarship to Newnham College, at the University of Cambridge, where she earned her Ph.D. and spent 14 years as a research fellow and assistant lecturer. Among her students there was the poet Sylvia Plath, who wrote that Krook was her ideal of a successful career woman and wonderful human being. While at Newnham, Krook published her first major critical work, Three Traditions of Moral Thought.

In 1960, she emigrated to Israel and began teaching at the Hebrew University of Jerusalem in the Department of English Literature.

Krook married the poet Zerubavel Gilad in 1968 and became a member of Kibbutz Ein Harod. She translated many of his poems into English.

Krook died on 13 November 1989.

== Awards and honours ==
- In 1973, Krook was awarded the Israel Prize in the humanities.
- In 1974, she became a member of the Israel Academy of Sciences and Humanities.

== Published works ==
- Three traditions of moral thought New York, Cambridge University Press, 1959
- The Ordeal of Consciousness in Henry James Cambridge, England 1962
- Elements of tragedy Yale University Press, 1969
- John Sergeant and his circle: a study of three seventeenth-century English Aristotelians (with Beverly C. Southgate) E.J. Brill, 1993

== See also ==
- List of Israel Prize recipients
