= Boris Solotareff =

Russian painter

Self-portrait of the artist, painted around 1920 in Paris.

Boris Solotareff (October 23, 1889 – July 1966) was a Moldovan Russian painter. He was active in Munich, Switzerland, and France, but spent the majority of his career in New York where he became a naturalized American citizen in 1949. Solotareff made use of a variety of styles; according to the Benezit Dictionary of Artists, his "work was in the mainstream of Eastern European Expressionism, with influences of Art Deco from the time when he lived in Paris." Solotareff's paintings have been exhibited widely, including the "Cinquantenaire Du Symbolisme" exhibition at the Bibliothèque Nationale (1936), the Vendome Galleries (New York, 1938), and the "Exhibition of oils and water colors" at the Charles Barzansky Galleries from October 1–20, 1940.

== Biography ==
Born in Bender, in the Bessarabia Governorate of the Russian Empire, Solotareff began his art studies at the Russian art school in Odessa, Ukraine. This went on until he turned 18 in 1907 when the artist moved to Munich, Germany enrolling at the Akademie der Bildenden Künste. After seven years in Munich, Solotareff moved to Lausanne, Switzerland. In the six years he stayed there his style underwent a change from the German Impressionist style that inspired his Munich paintings to one more influenced by Fauvism. In describing two of Solotareff's paintings from that period, "Meadow of Wild Flowers" and "Farm in Lausanne", James Gardner wrote "The paint has been thickly applied in elongated, energetic jabs that sway and pulsate in every direction like schools of fish. But only the surface seems agitated. Farther down there is the deep and reassuring calm that seems best to typify the Russian artist's sanguine disposition".

The year 1920 found Solotareff traveling in France and Italy before settling in Paris where, under the influence of Pablo Picasso and Marie Laurencin, he began to paint in a more neo-classical style. While in Paris, Solotareff was a member of the Salon des Indépendants. In 1937, the artist moved to New York, where he lived and painted for the rest of his life. He worked as a stage designer in the avant-garde Yiddish theater ARTEF (Yiddish: אַרבעטער טעאַטער פֿאַרבאַנד — Arbeter Teater Farband).

== Sources ==
- Charles Barzansky Galleries. (1940). Exhibition of oils and water colors. New York: Charles Barzansky Galleries. OCLC 82503654
- Solotareff, B., Gardner, J., & Borghi & Co. (1990). Boris Solotareff, 1889-1966: A retrospective : September 20-October 20, 1990. New York, NY: Borghi & Co. OCLC 23532316
- "SOLOTAREFF, Boris." Benezit Dictionary of Artists. In Oxford Art Online.
