= Proteagailovca =

- Village
- Interactive map of Proteagailovca
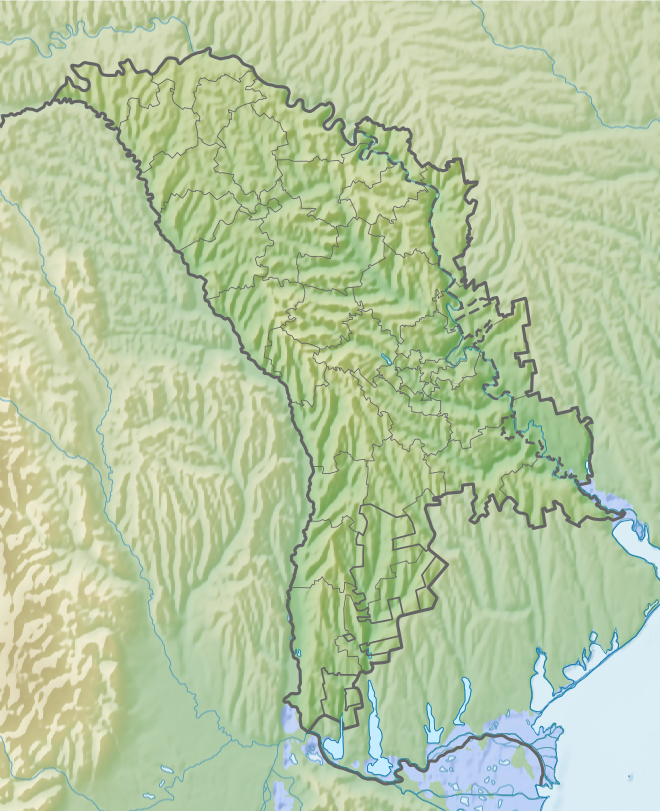
- Location within Transnistria and within Moldova Proteagailovca (Moldova)
- Coordinates: 46°49′N 29°27′E
- Country (de jure): Moldova
- Country (de facto): Transnistria (Note: Transnistria's political status is disputed. It considers itself to be an independent state, but this is not recognised by any UN member state. The Moldovan government and the international community consider Transnistria a part of Moldova's territory.)

Population (2004)
  - Total: 3,142
- Time zone: UTC+2 (EET)
  - Summer (DST): UTC+3 (EEST)
- Climate: Cfb

Proteagailovca (Moldovan Cyrillic and Russian: Протягайловка, romanized: Protyagaylovka; Ukrainian: Протягайлівка, romanized: Protyagaylivka) is a village in the municipality of Bender (Tighina), Moldova. It had a population of 3,142 at the 2004 Census. The locality, although situated on the right (western) bank of the river Dniester, is under the control of the breakaway Transnistrian authorities. Proteagailovca is located immediately to the west of the city, and is the only other locality in the municipality, except the city of Bender itself.

Of the 3,142 inhabitants of Proteagailovca, 1,482 (47.17%) Russians, 658 (20.94%) Ukrainians, 756 (24.06%) are Moldovans, 163 (5.19%) Bulgarians, 25 (0.80%) Gagauzians, 19 (0.60%) Belarusians, 6 (0.19%) Germans, 2 (0.06%) Jews, and 31 (0.48%) others and non-declared.
