= Bender, Moldova =

Bender Tighina
- Municipality
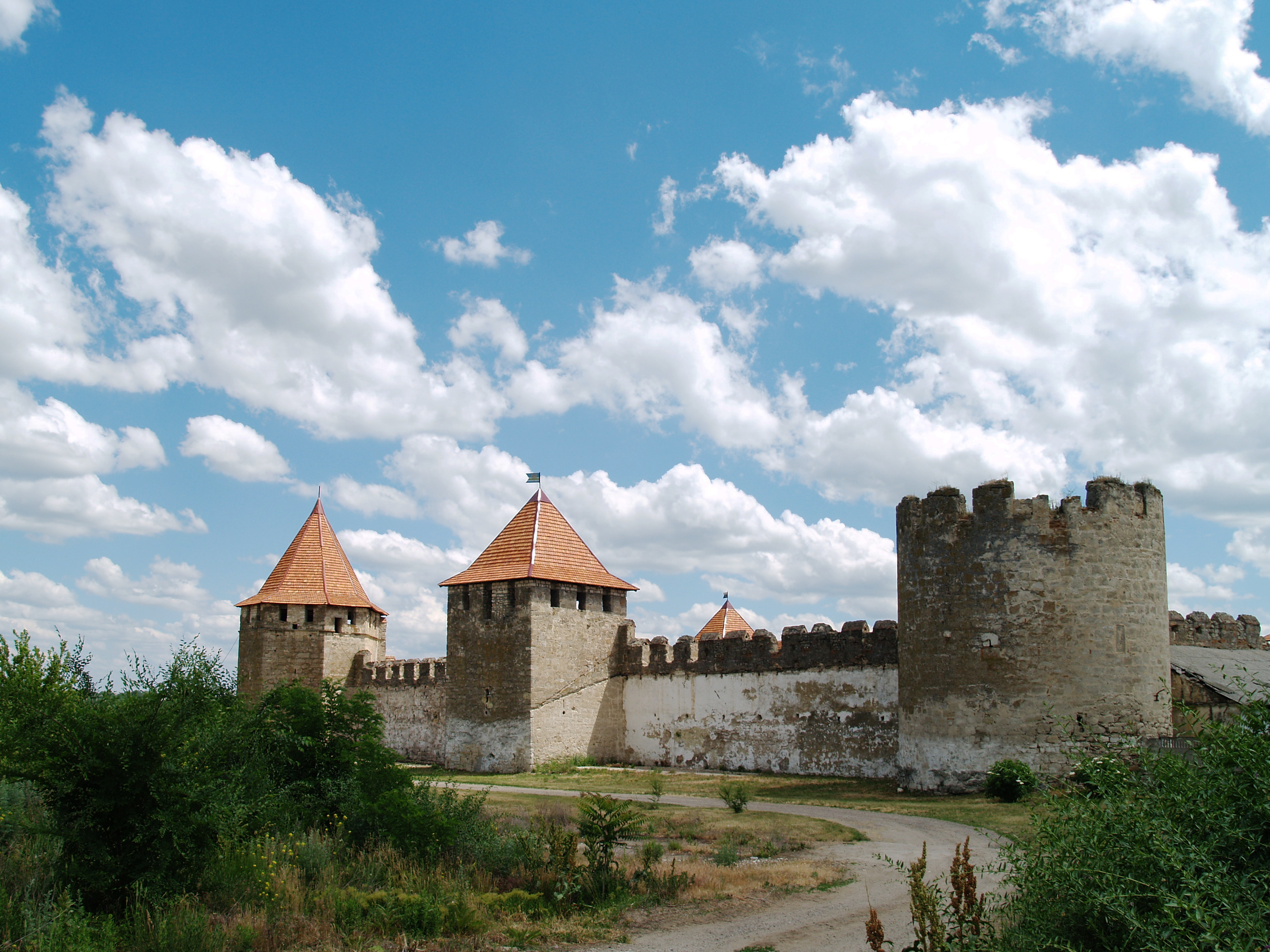
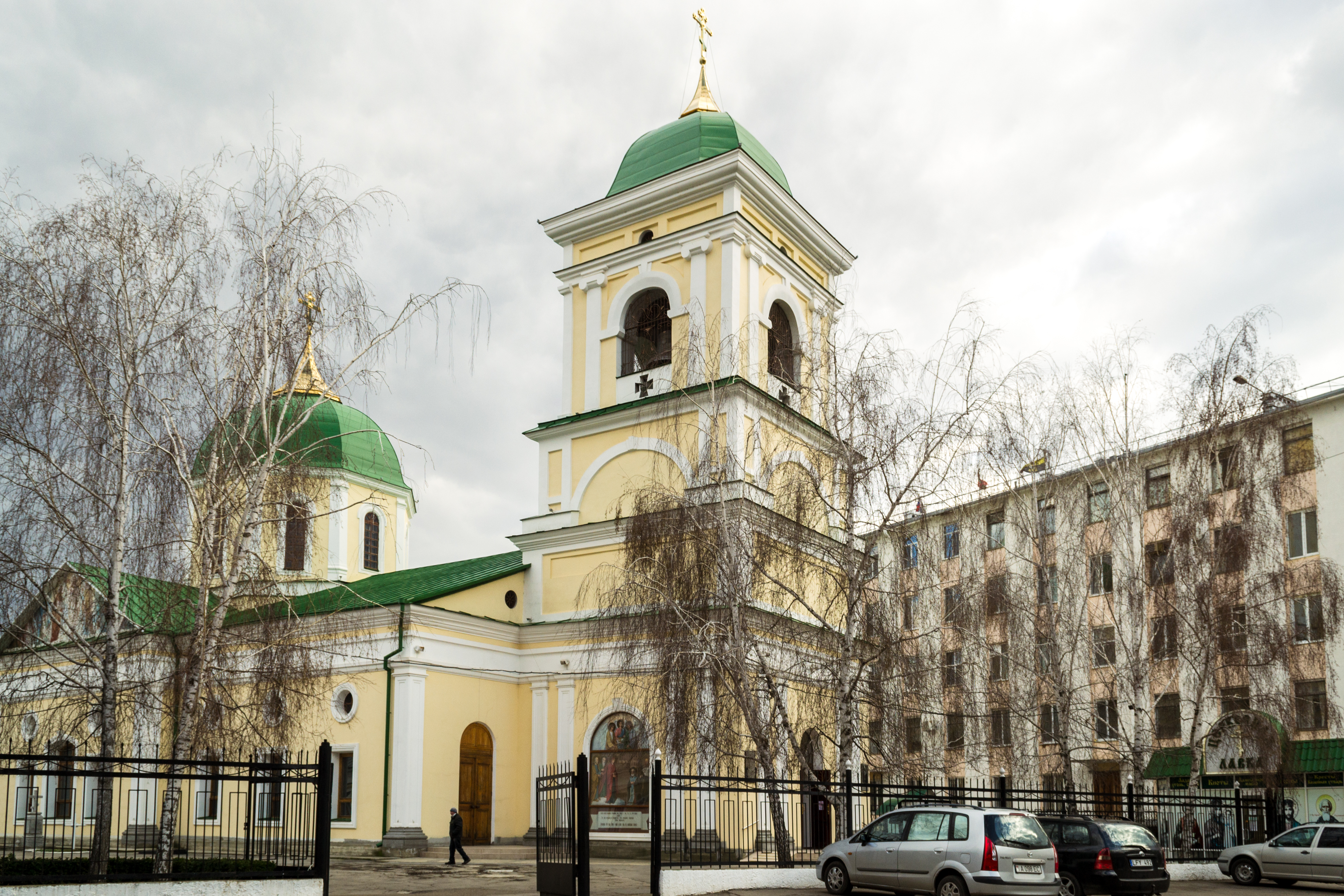
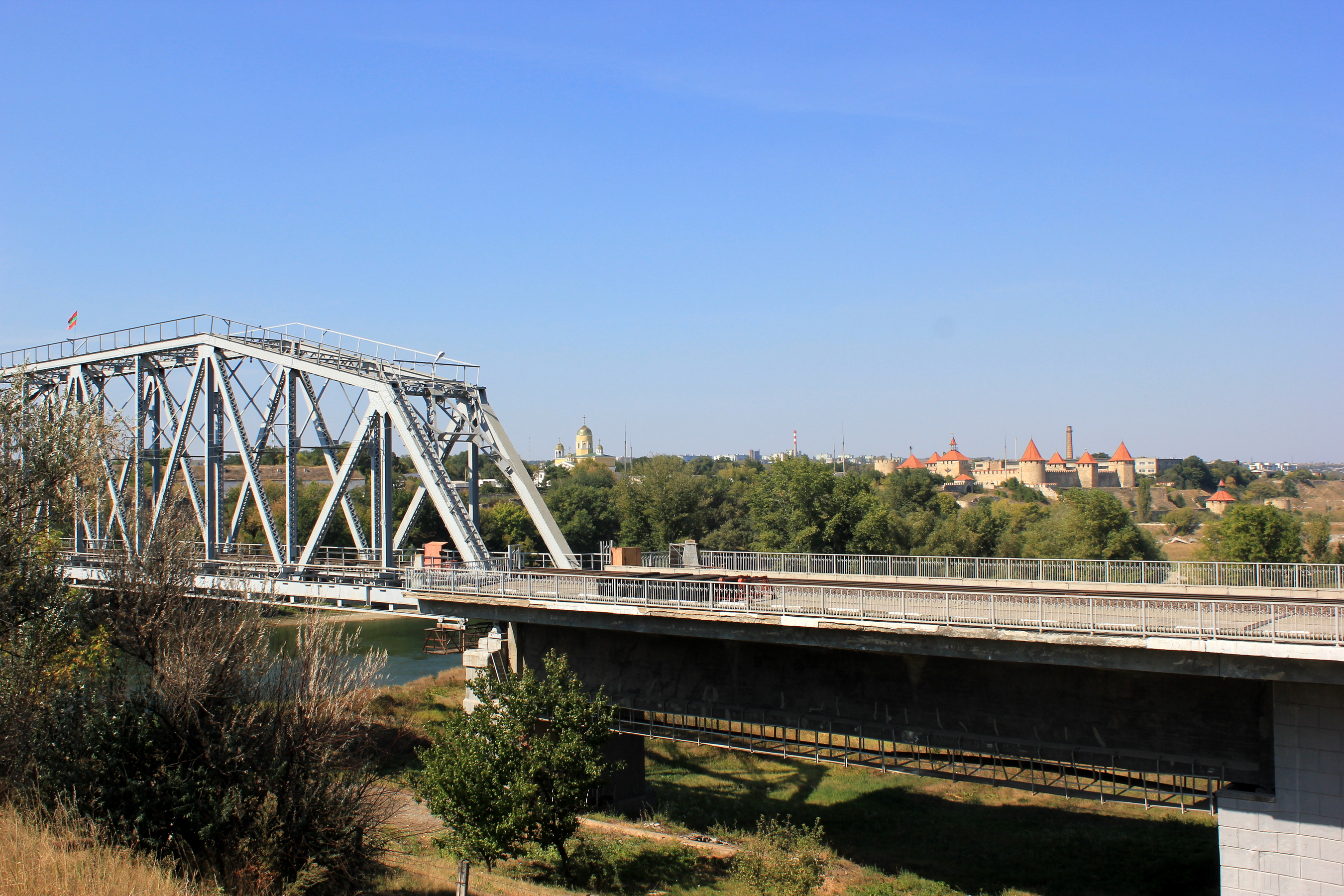
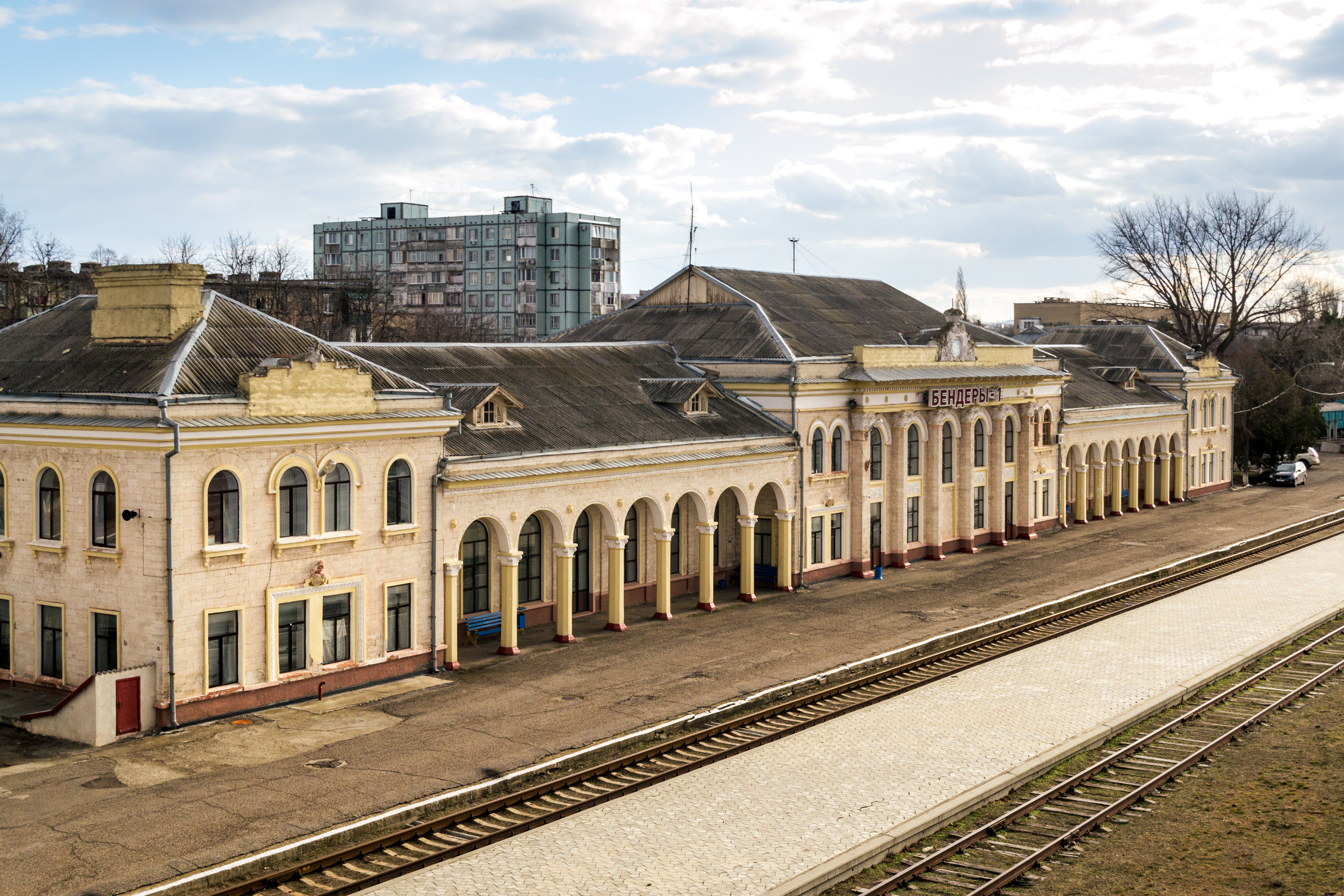
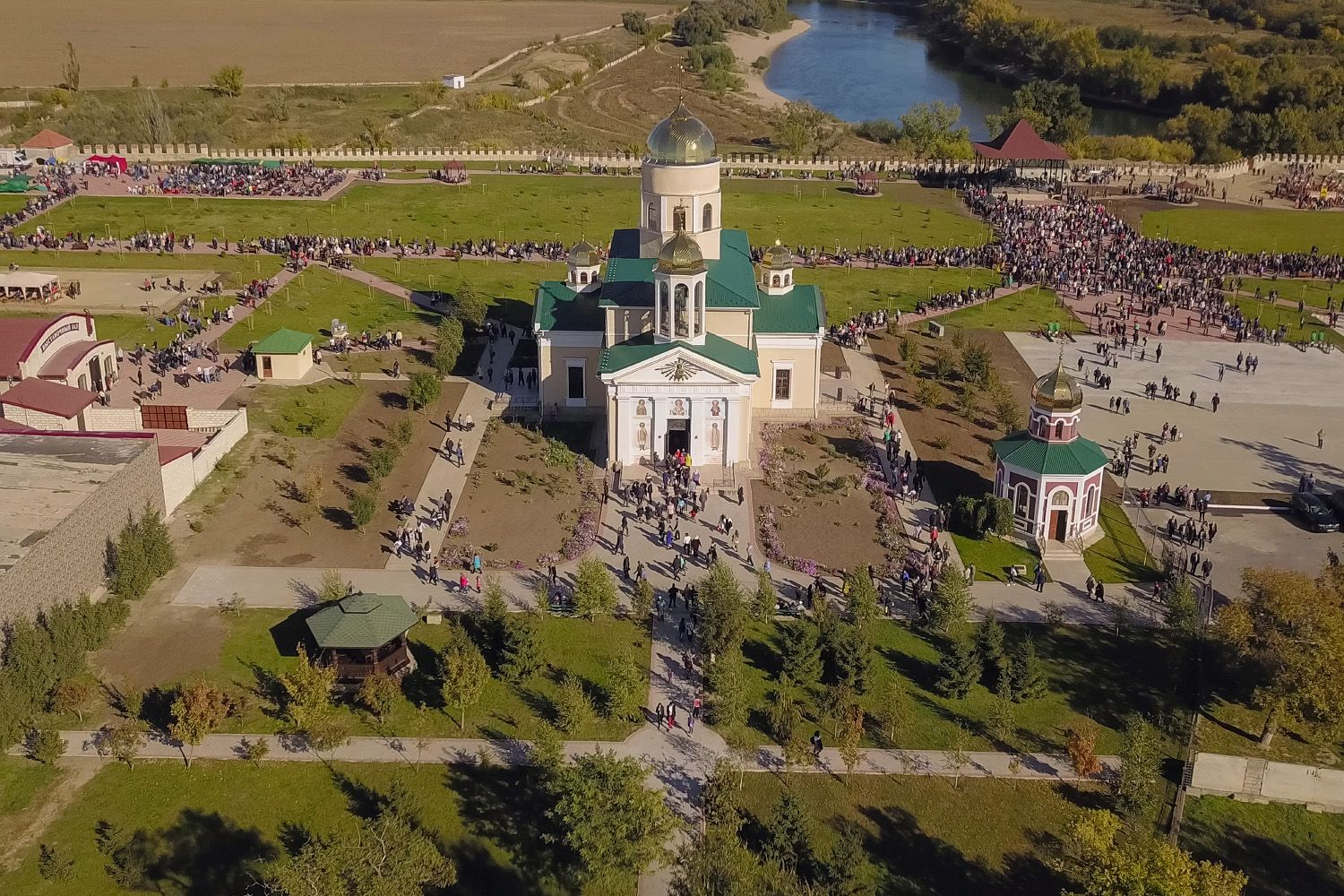
- From top, left to right: Bender Fortress; Transfiguration Cathedral; Railway bridge over the Dniester; Bender-1 railway station; Fortress church

- Flag Coat of arms

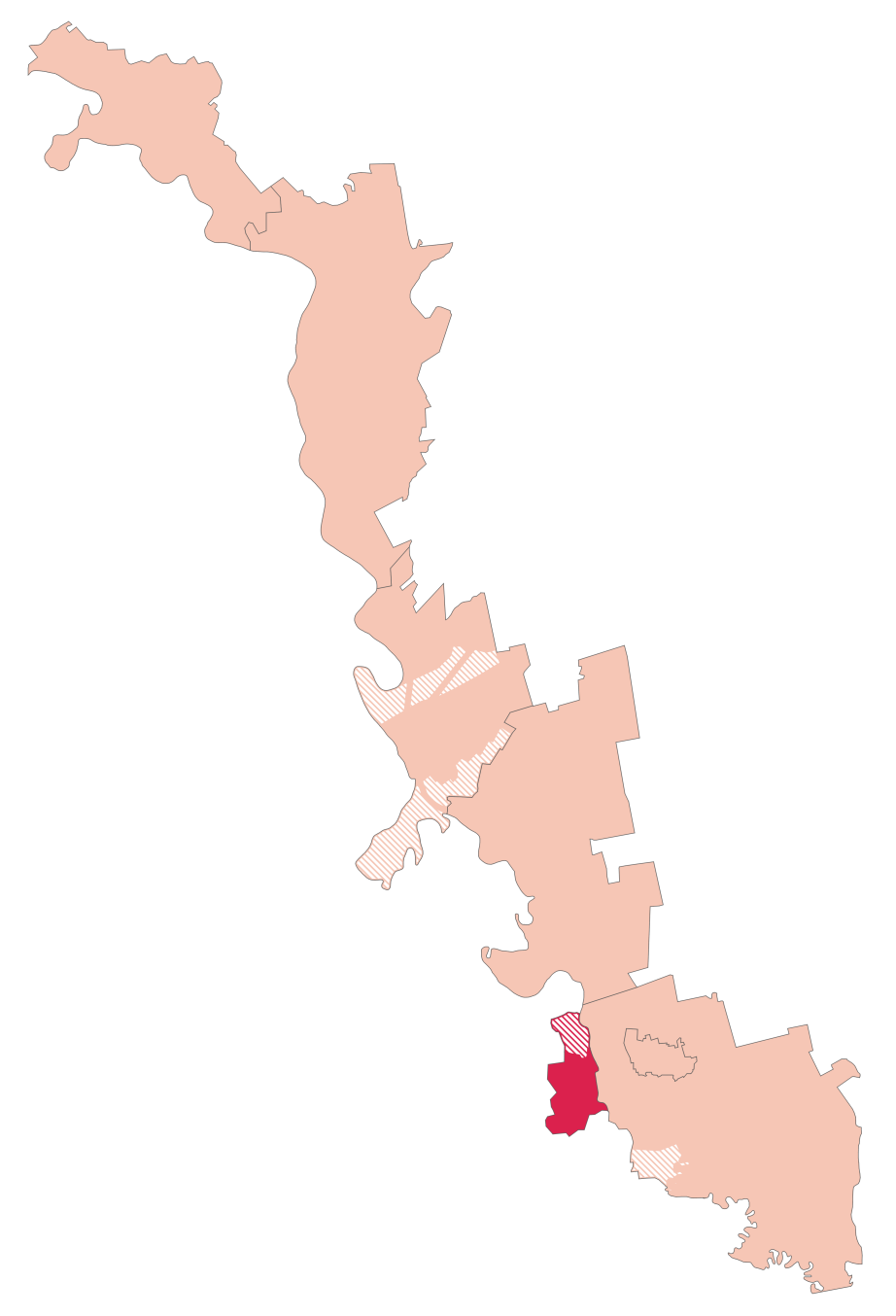
- Municipality of Bender (in red)

- Bender located in Moldova
- Interactive map of Bender
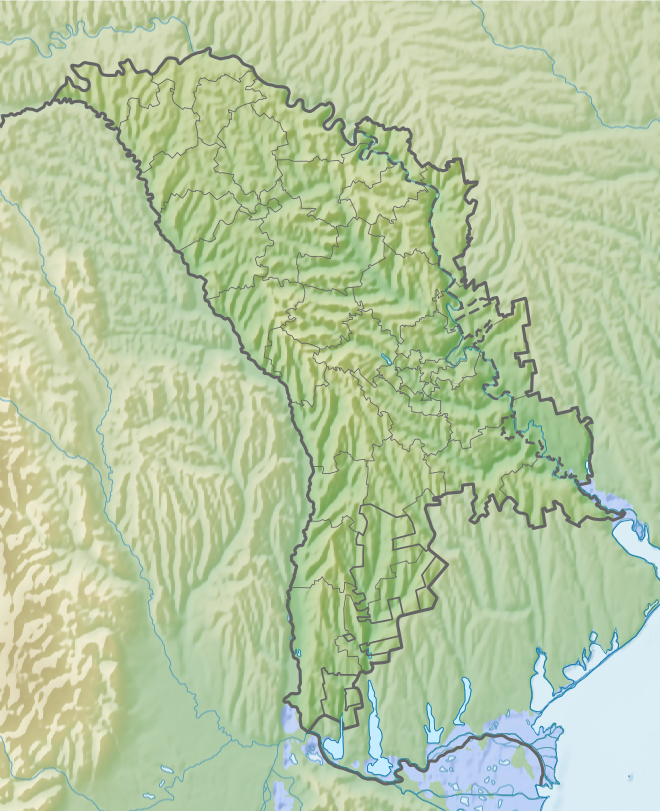
- Location of Bender within Transnistria and within Moldova Bender (Moldova) Bender (Europe)
- Coordinates: 46°50′N 29°29′E
- Country (de jure): Moldova
- Country (de facto): Transnistria (Note: Transnistria's political status is disputed. It considers itself to be an independent state, but this is not recognised by any UN member state. The Moldovan government and the international community consider Transnistria a part of Moldova's territory.)
- Founded: 1408

Government
  - Head of the State Administration of Bendery: Roman Ivanchenko

Area
  - Total: 97.29 km^{2} (37.56 sq mi)
- Elevation: 15 m (49 ft)

Population (2023)
  - Total: 83,919
- Time zone: UTC+2 (EET)
- Climate: Cfb
- Website: bendery.gospmr.org

Bender (Romanian pronunciation: [benˈder], Moldovan Cyrillic: Бендер) or Bendery (Russian: Бендеры, [bʲɪnˈdɛrɨ]; Ukrainian: Бендери), also known as Tighina, is a city within the internationally recognized borders of Moldova under de facto control of the unrecognized Pridnestrovian Moldavian Republic (Transnistria) (PMR) since 1992. It is located on the western bank of the river Dniester in the historical region of Bessarabia. It is the second-largest city in Transnistria, and the fourth-largest city in Moldova.

Together with its suburb Proteagailovca, the city forms a municipality, which is separate from Transnistria (as an administrative unit of Moldova) according to Moldovan law. Bender is located in the buffer zone established at the end of the 1992 War of Transnistria. While the Joint Control Commission has overriding powers in the city, Transnistria has de facto administrative control.

The fortress of Tighina was one of the important historic fortresses of the Principality of Moldova until 1812.

== Name ==
First mentioned in 1408 as Tyagyanyakyacha (Old East Slavic: Тягянякяча) in a document in Old Slavonic (the term has Cuman origins), the town was known in the Middle Ages as Tighina in Romanian from Moldavian sources and later as Bender in Ottoman sources. The fortress and the city were called Bender (ultimately from Persian bandar 'port') for most of the time they were ruled by the Ottomans (1538–1812), and during most of the time they belonged to the Russian Empire (1828–1917). They were known as Tighina ([tiˈɡina]) in the Principality of Moldavia, in the early part of the Russian Empire period (1812–1828), and during the time the city belonged to Romania (1918–1940; 1941–1944).

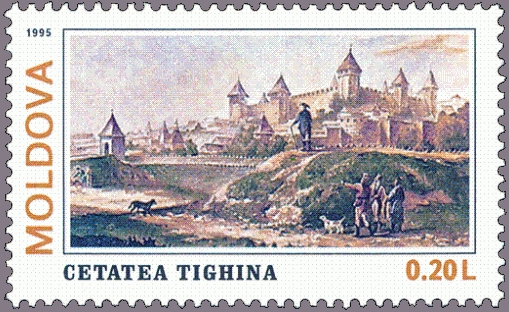
The fortress of Bender on a Moldovan stamp

The city is part of the historical region of Bessarabia. During the Soviet period the city was known in the Moldavian SSR as Bender in Romanian, written Бендер with the Moldovan Cyrillic alphabet, as Bendery (Бендéры) in Russian and Bendery (Бенде́ри) in Ukrainian. Today the city is officially named Bender, but both Bender and Tighina are in use.

== History ==
The town was first mentioned as an important customs post in a commerce grant issued by the Moldavian voivode Alexander the Good to the merchants of Lviv on 8 October 1408. The name "Tighina" is found in documents from the second half of the 15th century. Genoese merchants used to call the town Teghenaccio. The town was the main Moldavian customs point on the commercial road linking the country to the Crimean Khanate. During his reign of Moldavia, Stephen III had a small wooden fort built in the town to defend the settlement from Tatar raids.

In 1538, the Ottoman sultan Suleiman the Magnificent conquered the town from Moldavia, and renamed it Bender. Its fortifications were developed into a full fortress under the same name under the supervision of the Turkish architect Koji Mimar Sinan. The Ottomans used it to keep the pressure on Moldavia. At the end of the 16th century several unsuccessful attempts to retake the fortress were made: in the summer of 1574 Prince John III the Terrible led a siege on the fortress, as did Michael the Brave in 1595 and 1600. About the same time the fortress was attacked by Zaporozhian Cossacks.

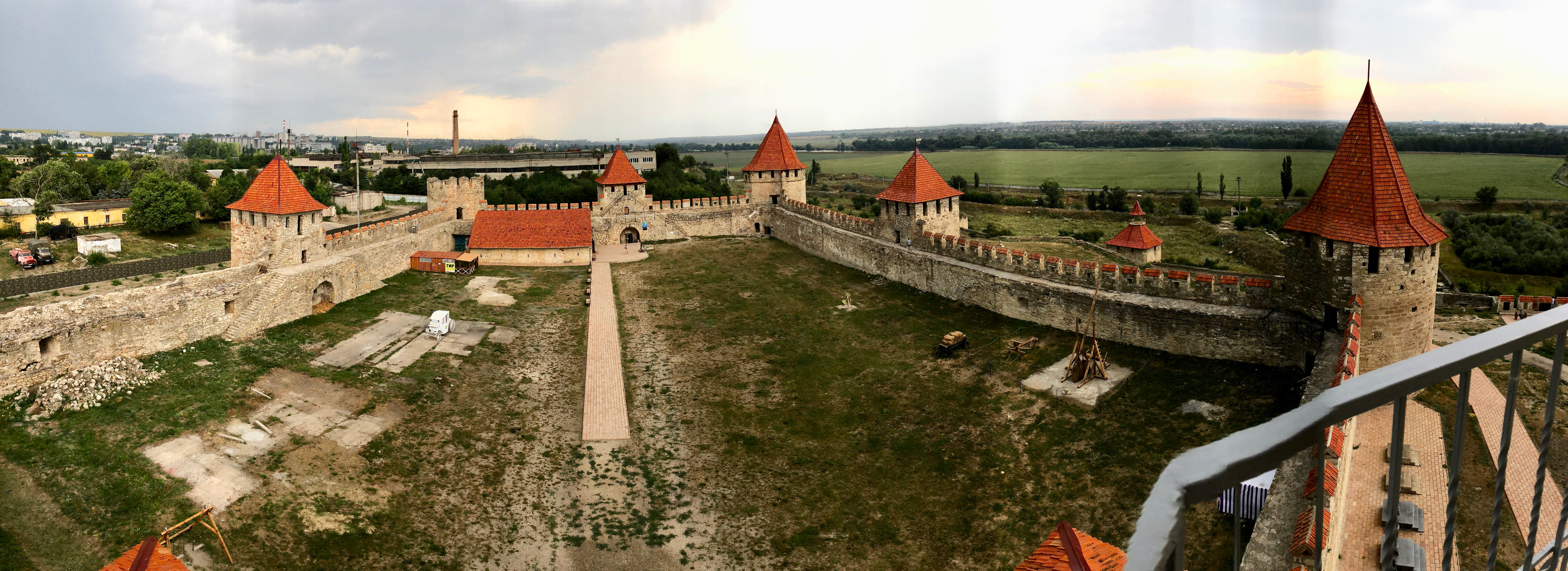
The remnants of Bender fortress wall with modern city skyline in the background

In the 18th century, the fort's area was expanded and modernized by the prince of Moldavia Antioh Cantemir, who carried out these works under Ottoman supervision.

On 5 April 1710 the Bender Constitution (more commonly known as the Constitution of Pylyp Orlyk) was accepted in Bender. It established the principle of the separation of powers in government between the legislative, executive, and judiciary branches almost 40 years before the publication of Montesquieu's Spirit of the Laws.

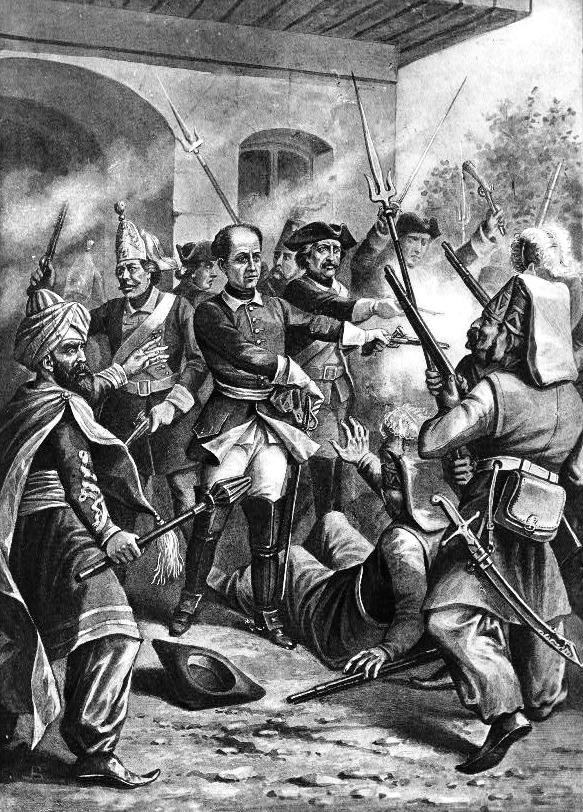
King Charles XII of Sweden at Bender

In 1713, the fortress, the town, and the neighboring village of Varnița were the site of skirmishes between Charles XII of Sweden, who had taken refuge there with the Cossack Hetman Ivan Mazepa after his defeat in the Battle of Poltava in 1709, and the Turks who wished to enforce the departure of the Swedish king.

During the second half of the 18th century, the fortress fell three times to the Russians during the Russo-Turkish Wars (in 1770, 1789, and in 1806 without a fight).

Along with Bessarabia, the city was annexed to the Russian Empire in 1812, and remained part of the Russian Governorate of Bessarabia until 1917. Many Ukrainians, Russians and Jews settled in or around Bender, and the town quickly became predominantly Russian-speaking. By 1897, speakers of Romanian made up only around 7% of Bender's population, while 33.4% were Jews.

Tighina was part of the Moldavian Democratic Republic in 1917–1918, and after 1918, following the Union of Bessarabia with Romania, the city belonged to the Kingdom of Romania, where it was the seat of Tighina County. In 1918, it was shortly controlled by the Odesa Soviet Republic which was driven out by the Romanian army. The local population was critical of Romanian authorities; pro-Soviet separatism remained popular. On Easter Day, 1919, the bridge over the Dniester River was blown up by the French Army in order to block the Bolsheviks from coming to the city. In the same year, there was a pro-Soviet uprising in Bender, attempting to attach the city to the newly founded Soviet Union. Several hundred communist workers and Red Army members from Bessarabia, headed by Grigoriy Borisov, seized control in Bender on 27 May. However, the uprising was crushed on the same day by the Romanian army.

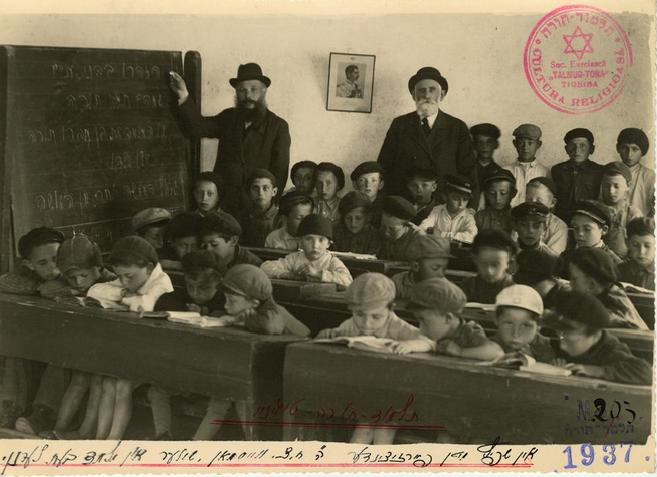
Jewish school in Tighina, 1937. The portrait of king Carol II of Romania is also visible

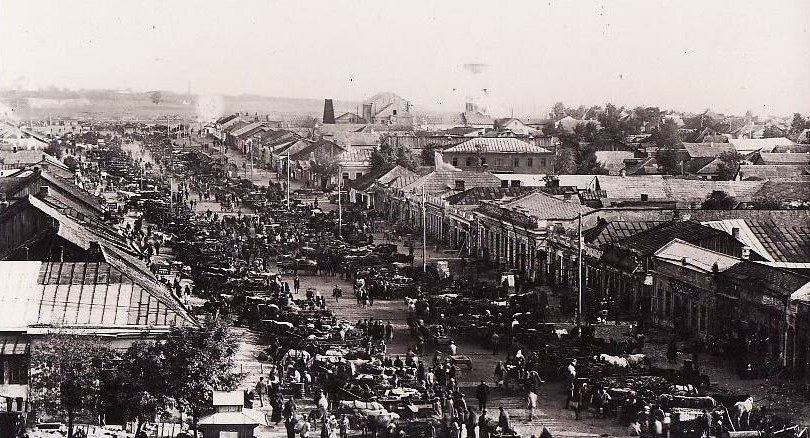
Market in Tighina in 1938

Romania launched a policy of Romanianization and the use of Russian was now discouraged and in certain cases restricted. In Bender, however, Russian continued to be the city's most widely spoken language, being native to 53% of its residents in 1930. Although their share had doubled, Romanian-speakers made up only 15%.

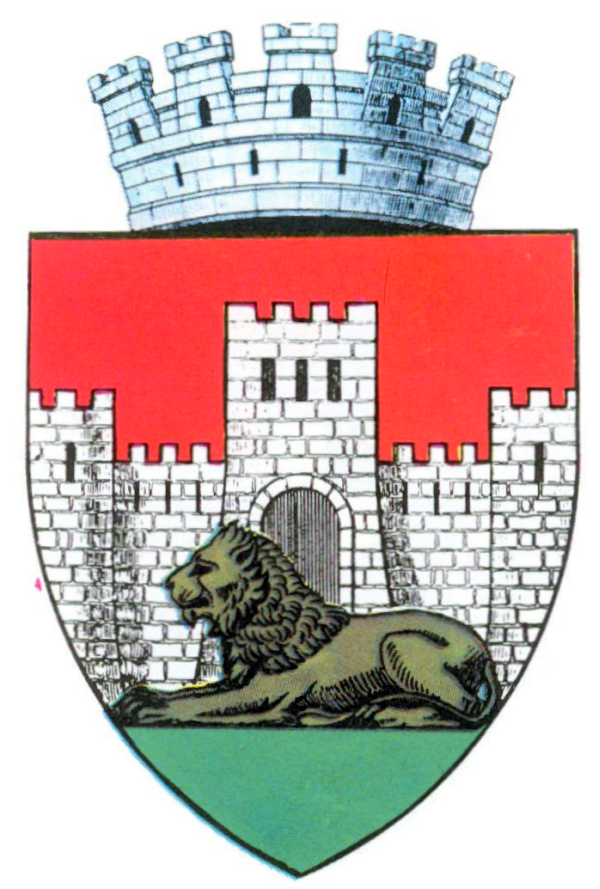
Interwar period coat of arms of Tighina within the Kingdom of Romania

Along with Bessarabia, the city was occupied by the Soviet Union on 28 June 1940, following an ultimatum. In the course of World War II, it was retaken by Romania in July 1941 (under which a treaty regarding the occupation of Transnistria was signed a month later), and again by the USSR in August 1944. Most of the city's Jews were killed during the Holocaust, although Bender continued to have a significant Jewish community until most emigrated after the dissolution of the Soviet Union. The Jews were deported to Transnistria by the Romanian authorities in 1941, where a large majority of them died.

In 1940–1941 and from 1944 to 1991 it was one of the four "republican cities", not subordinated to a district, of the Moldavian Soviet Socialist Republic, one of the 15 republics of the Soviet Union. Since 1991, the city has been disputed between the Republic of Moldova and Transnistria. Due to the city's key strategic location on the right bank of the Dniester river, 10 km (6 mi) from left-bank Tiraspol, Bender saw the heaviest fighting of the 1992 War of Transnistria during the Battle of Bender. Since then, it is controlled by Transnistrian authorities, although it has been formally in the demilitarized zone established at the end of the conflict.

Moldovan authorities control the commune of Varnița, a suburb on the fringe of the city to the north. Transnistrian authorities control the suburban communes of Proteagailovca, which borders the city to the west and Gîsca, which borders the city to the south-west. They also control Chițcani and Cremenciug, further to the south-east, while Moldovans are in control of Copanca, further to the south-east.

== Administration ==
Nikolai Gliga is the head of the state administration of Bender as of 2015.

=== List of Heads of the state administration of Bender ===
- Tom Zenovich (1995 ~ 30 October 2001)
- Aleksandr Posudnevsky (30 October 2001 ~ 11 January 2007)
- Vyacheslav Kogut (11 January 2007 ~ 5 January 2012)
- Aleksandr Moskalyov, acting Head of Administration (5 January 2012 ~ 9 February 2012)
- Valery Kernichuk (9 February 2012 ~ 15 November 2012)
- Yuriy Gervazyuk (24 January 2013 ~ 18 March 2015)
- Lada Delibalt (20 March 2015 ~ 7 April 2015)
- Nikolai Gliga (7 April 2015 ~ )

== Climate ==
Climate data for Bendery (1991-2021)
Month	Jan	Feb	Mar	Apr	May	Jun	Jul	Aug	Sep	Oct	Nov	Dec	Year
Mean daily maximum °C (°F)	1.4 (34.5)	3.9 (39.0)	9.5 (49.1)	16.3 (61.3)	22.7 (72.9)	26.4 (79.5)	28.7 (83.7)	28.6 (83.5)	22.4 (72.3)	15.2 (59.4)	8.9 (48.0)	3.5 (38.3)	15.6 (60.1)
Daily mean °C (°F)	−1.6 (29.1)	0.3 (32.5)	5.0 (41.0)	11.3 (52.3)	17.6 (63.7)	21.7 (71.1)	24.0 (75.2)	23.7 (74.7)	17.9 (64.2)	11.2 (52.2)	5.9 (42.6)	0.8 (33.4)	11.5 (52.7)
Mean daily minimum °C (°F)	−4.6 (23.7)	−3.2 (26.2)	0.6 (33.1)	6.1 (43.0)	12.0 (53.6)	16.5 (61.7)	18.8 (65.8)	18.6 (65.5)	13.5 (56.3)	7.5 (45.5)	3.1 (37.6)	−1.9 (28.6)	7.3 (45.1)
Average precipitation mm (inches)	39 (1.5)	29 (1.1)	35 (1.4)	44 (1.7)	48 (1.9)	66 (2.6)	48 (1.9)	41 (1.6)	45 (1.8)	38 (1.5)	36 (1.4)	37 (1.5)	506 (19.9)
Average relative humidity (%)	82	77	70	65	59	58	57	54	61	71	80	80	68
Mean monthly sunshine hours	86.8	87.6	136.4	198	275.9	306	328.6	319.3	249	189.1	84	68.2	2,328.9
Mean daily sunshine hours	2.8	3.1	4.4	6.6	8.9	10.2	10.6	10.3	8.3	6.1	2.8	2.2	6.4
Source: CLIMATE-DATA Weather2visit(Sun)

== People and culture ==
=== Demographics ===
In 1920, the population of Bender was approximately 26,000. At that time, one third of the population was Jewish. One third of the population was Romanian. Germans, Russians, and Bulgarians were also mixed into the population during that time.

At the 2004 Census, the city had a population of 100,169, of which the city itself 97,027, and the commune of Proteagailovca, 3,142.

Ethnic composition
Ethnic group	1930 census	1959 census	1970 census	1979 census	1989 census	2004 census				
Ethnic group	1930 census	1959 census	1970 census	1979 census	1989 census	the city itself	Proteagailovca	The municipality	%	
Russians	15,116	N/A	N/A	N/A	57,800	41,949	1,482	43,431	43.35%	
Moldovans^{1}	-	N/A	N/A	N/A	41,400	24,313	756	25,069	25.03%	
Romanians^{1}	5,464	N/A	N/A	N/A	-	61	0-5	61-66	0.06%	
Ukrainians^{2}	-	N/A	N/A	N/A	25,100	17,348	658	18,006	17.98%	
Ruthenians^{2}	1,349	N/A	N/A	N/A	-	-	-	-	-	
Bulgarians	170	N/A	N/A	N/A	3,800	3,001	163	3,164	3.16%	
Gagauzians	40	N/A	N/A	N/A	1,600	1,066	25	1,091	1.09%	
Jews	8,279	N/A	N/A	N/A	-	383	2	385	0.38%	
Germans	243	N/A	N/A	-	-	258	6	264	0.26%	
Poles	309	N/A	N/A	N/A	-	190	0-12	190-202	0.20%	
Armenians	46	N/A	N/A	N/A	-	173	0-16	173-189	0.18%	
Roma	24	N/A	N/A	N/A	-	132	0-5	132-137	0.13%	
Belarusians	188	N/A	N/A	N/A	-	713	19	732	0.73%	
others	188	N/A	N/A	N/A	8,300	7,440	0-31	7,440-7,471	7.44%	
non-declared	51	N/A	N/A	-	8,300	7,440	0-31	7,440-7,471	7.44%	N/A
Greeks	37	N/A	N/A	-	8,300	7,440	0-31	7,440-7,471	7.44%	N/A
Hungarians	24	N/A	N/A	N/A	8,300	7,440	0-31	7,440-7,471	7.44%	N/A
Serbs, Croats, Slovenes	22	N/A	N/A	N/A	8,300	7,440	0-31	7,440-7,471	7.44%	N/A
Czechs, Slovaks	19	N/A	N/A	N/A	8,300	7,440	0-31	7,440-7,471	7.44%	N/A
Turks	2	N/A	N/A	N/A	8,300	7,440	0-31	7,440-7,471	7.44%	N/A
Albanians	1	N/A	N/A	N/A	8,300	7,440	0-31	7,440-7,471	7.44%	N/A
Total	31,384	43,000	72,300	101,292	138,000	97,027	3,142	100,169	100%	

Note: ^{1} Since the independence of Moldova, there has been ongoing controversy over whether Romanians and Moldovans should be counted officially as the same ethnic group or not. At the census, every citizen could only declare one nationality. Consequently, one could not declare oneself both Moldovan and Romanian.

Note: ^{2} The Ukrainian population of Bessarabia was counted in the past as "Ruthenians"

Native language
Language	1930 census	2004 census
Russian	16,566	N/A
Yiddish	8,117	N/A
Romanian	4,718	N/A
Ukrainian	1,286	N/A
German	225	N/A
Polish	219	N/A
Bulgarian	78	N/A
Turkish	26	N/A
Greek	21	N/A
Hungarian	20	N/A
Romani languages	16	N/A
Czech, Slovak	14	N/A
Armenian	11	N/A
Serbo-Croatian, Slovene	8	N/A
Albanian	2	N/A
other	11	N/A
non-declared	46	N/A
Total	31,384	100,169

Population dynamics by years:

Historical population

Year	Pop.	±%
1897	31,797	—
1939	30,700	−3.5%
1959	43,109	+40.4%
1970	72,321	+67.8%
1989	129,969	+79.7%
1991	133,000	+2.3%
2004	97,027	−27.0%

Year	Pop.	±%
2008	94,404	−2.7%
2009	94,056	−0.4%
2010	93,751	−0.3%
2011	93,327	−0.5%
2012	92,990	−0.4%
2013	92,383	−0.7%
2014	91,882	−0.5%

Year	Pop.	±%
2015	91,044	−0.9%
2015-10	90,507	−0.6%
2016	84,600	−6.5%
2017	83,700	−1.1%
2018	83,200	−0.6%
2019	83,100	−0.1%
2020	83,200	+0.1%

== Media ==
- Radio Chișinău 106.1 FM

== Sport ==
FC Tighina is the city's professional football club, formerly playing in the top Moldovan football league, the Divizia Națională, before being relegated.

== Notable people ==
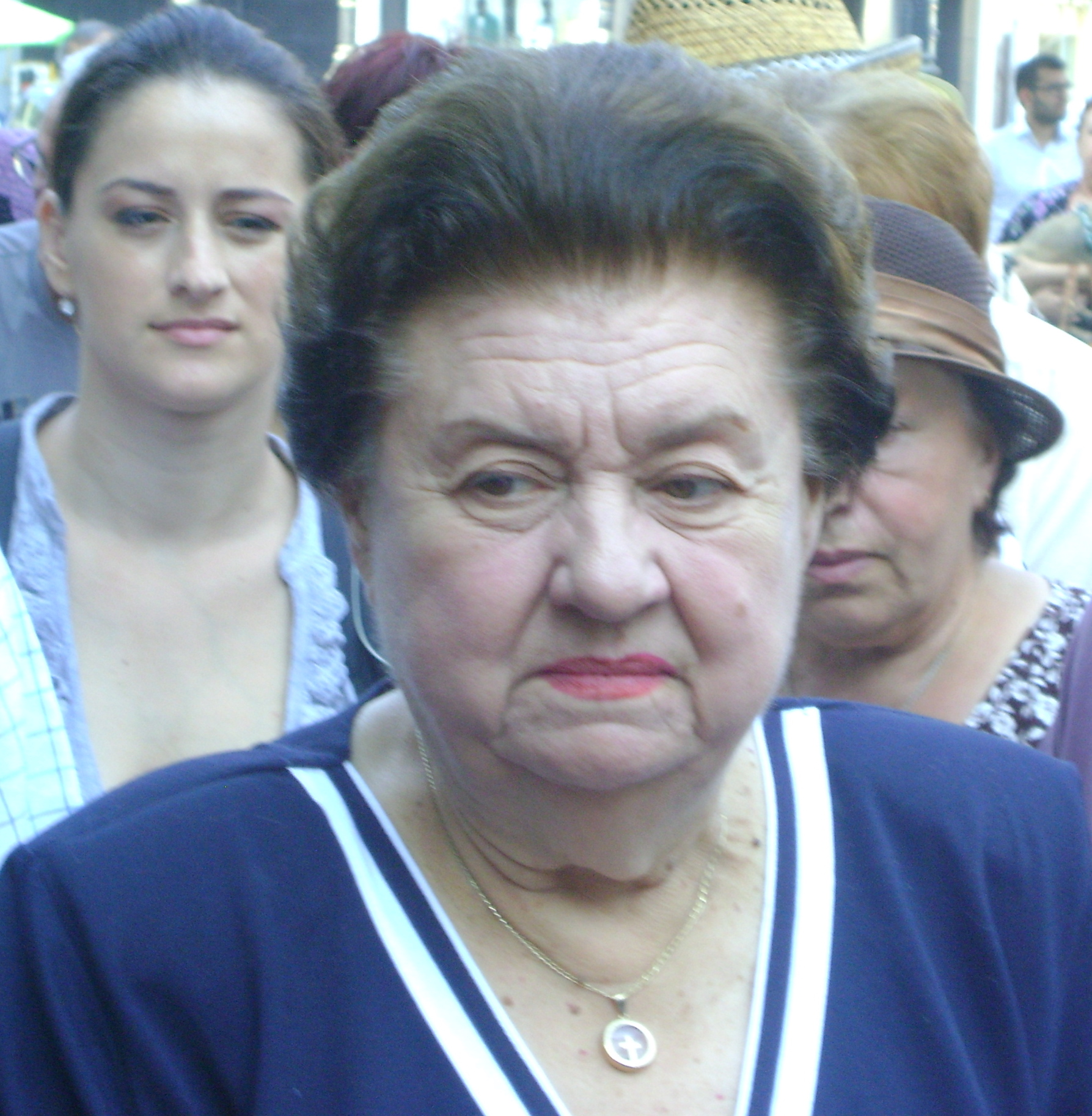
Tamara Buciuceanu

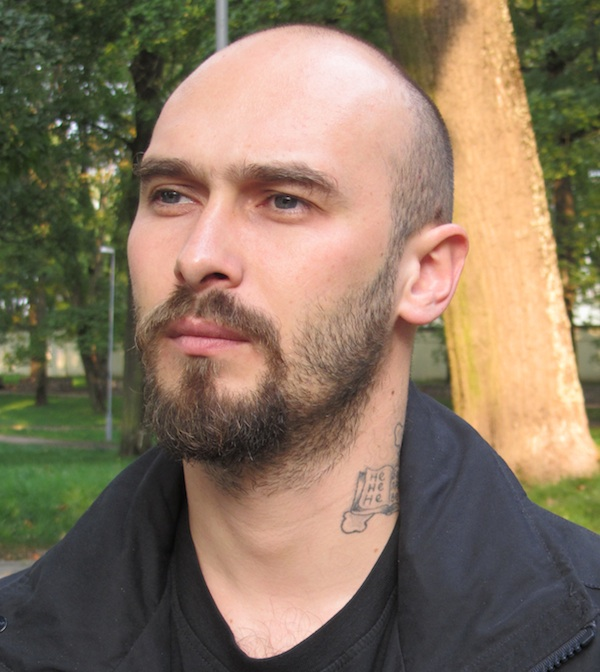
Nicolai Lilin

- Liubov Abravitova (born 1980), Ukrainian diplomat
- Mehmed Selim Pasha (1771–1831), Ottoman statesman
- Lev Berg (1876–1950), leading Jewish Russian geographer, biologist and ichthyologist
- Boris Solotareff (1889–1966), Russian painter
- Jerzy Neyman (1894–1981), Polish mathematician and statistician
- Baruch Agadati (1895–), Russian-born Israeli classical ballet dancer, choreographer, painter, and film producer and director
- Mozes Kahana (1897–1974), writer, poet, first chairman of the Moldovan Writers' Union
- Sir Michael Postan FBA (1899–1981), British historian
- Yosef Kushnir (1900–1983), Israeli politician who served in the Knesset
- Maurice Raizman (1905–1974), French chess master
- Yevgeny Fyodorov (1910–1981), Soviet geophysicist, statesman, public figure and academician
- Zrubavel Gilad (1912–1988), Hebrew poet, editor and translator
- Tamara Buciuceanu (1929–2019), Romanian stage, screen and TV personality
- Emil Constantinescu (born 1939), Romanian professor and politician, who served as the third President of Romania, from 1996 to 2000.
- Viktor Sokolov (born 1962), admiral and commander of the Russian Black Sea Fleet
- Nicolai Lilin (born 1980), Italian-Moldovan writer famous for writing Siberian Education, a fake memoir which narrated his youth in Bender
- Iulia Buciuceanu (1931–2022), Romanian opera singer
- Ilie Cazac (born 1985), former Moldovan tax inspector and political prisoner
- Liuba Chișinevschi (1911–1981), Romanian communist
- Juliu Edlis (1929–2009), Russian writer
- Roman Roșca (born 1982), Moldovan jurist and politician

=== Sport ===
- Veaceslav Semionov (born 1956), Moldavian football manager and former footballer. Since November 2014 he is the head coach of Moldavian football club FC Dacia Chișinău
- Fedosei Ciumacenco (born 1973), Olympian Moldovan race walker, competed in the 20 kilometres distance at the Summer Olympics: 1996, 2000, 2004 and 2008
- Serghei Stolearenco (born 1978), Moldovan former sprint freestyle swimmer, competed in the men's 50 m freestyle at the 2000 Summer Olympics
- Alexandru Melenciuc (born 1979), Moldovan footballer. He currently plays for Navbahor Namangan
- Andrei Tcaciuc (born 1982), Moldavian football midfielder who plays for FC Speranța Crihana Veche
- Igor Bugaiov (born 1984), footballer, who plays for FC Irtysh Pavlodar
- Alexei Casian (born 1987), Moldavian football midfielder who represents Lane Xang Intra F.C.
- Vadim Cemîrtan (born 1987), Moldovan football striker who plays for FC Bunyodkor
- Artyom Khachaturov (born 1992), Armenian-Moldovan footballer who currently plays for Moldovan club FC Zimbru Chișinău

== Twin towns and sister cities ==
Bender is twinned with:

- Beira, Mozambique
- Cavriago, Italy
- Dubăsari, Transnistria (defacto), Moldova (dejure)
- Montesilvano, Italy
- (Georgia (country)) Ochamchire, Abkhazia (defacto), Georgia (dejure)

== Gallery ==
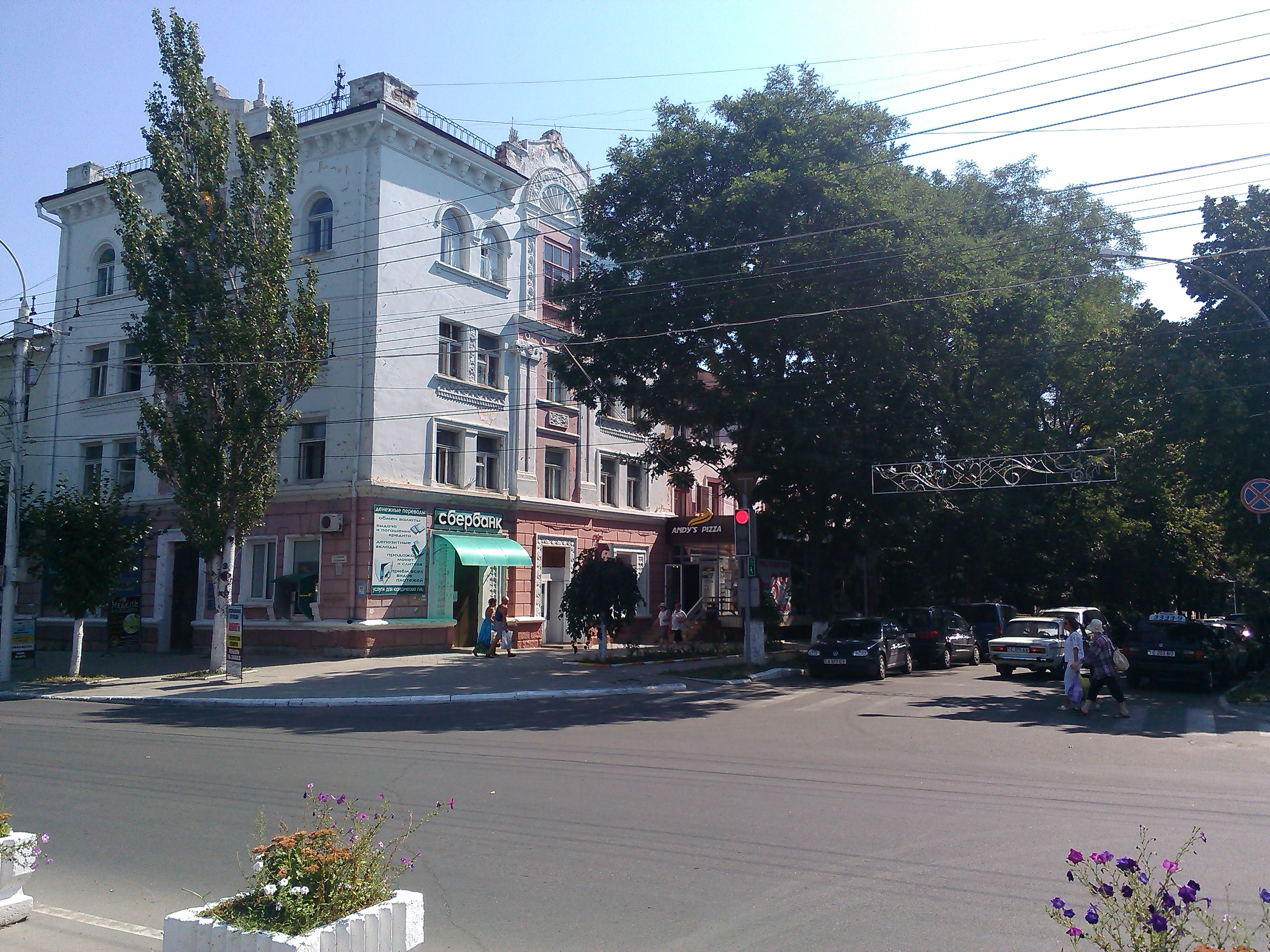
City centre

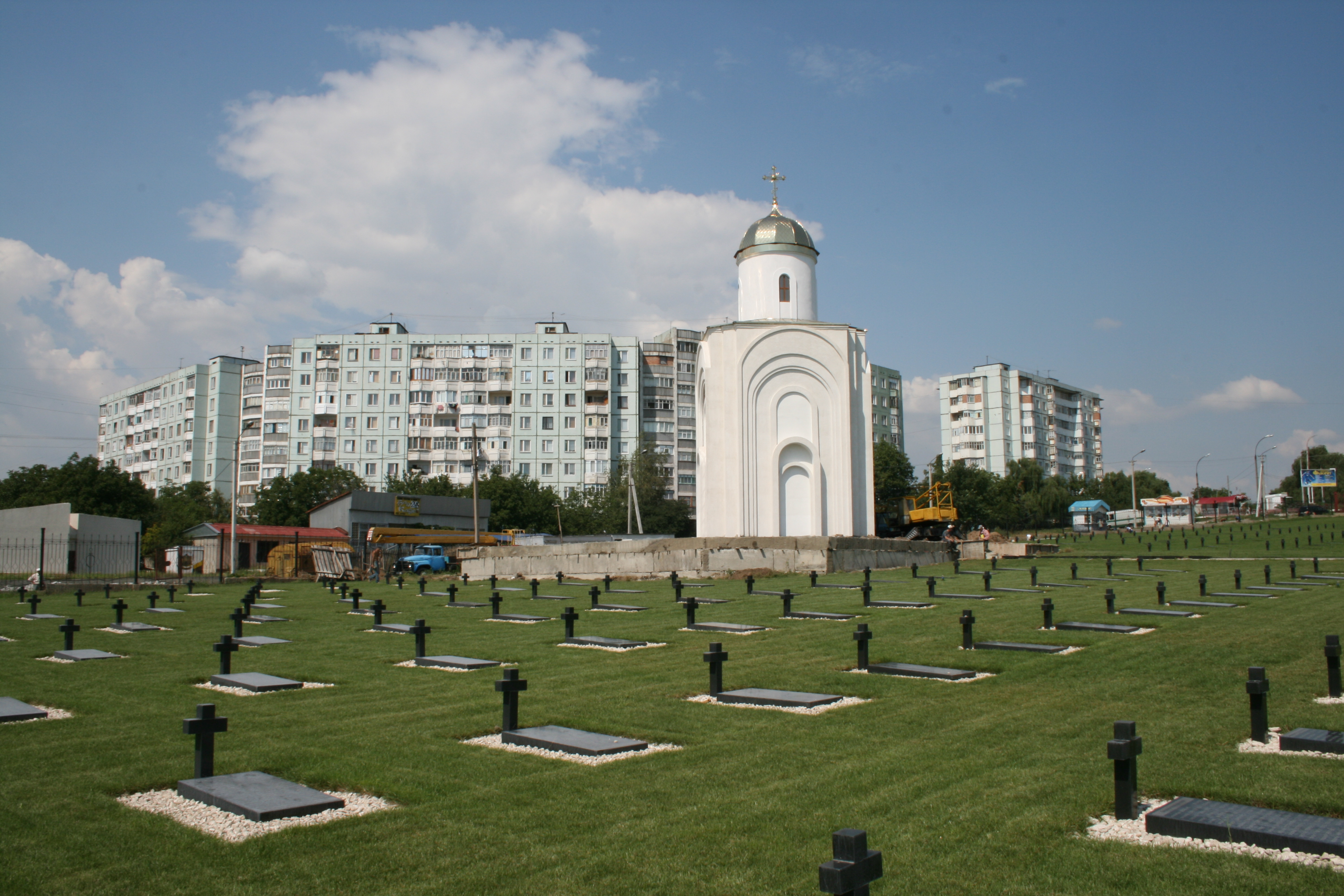
Military cemetery

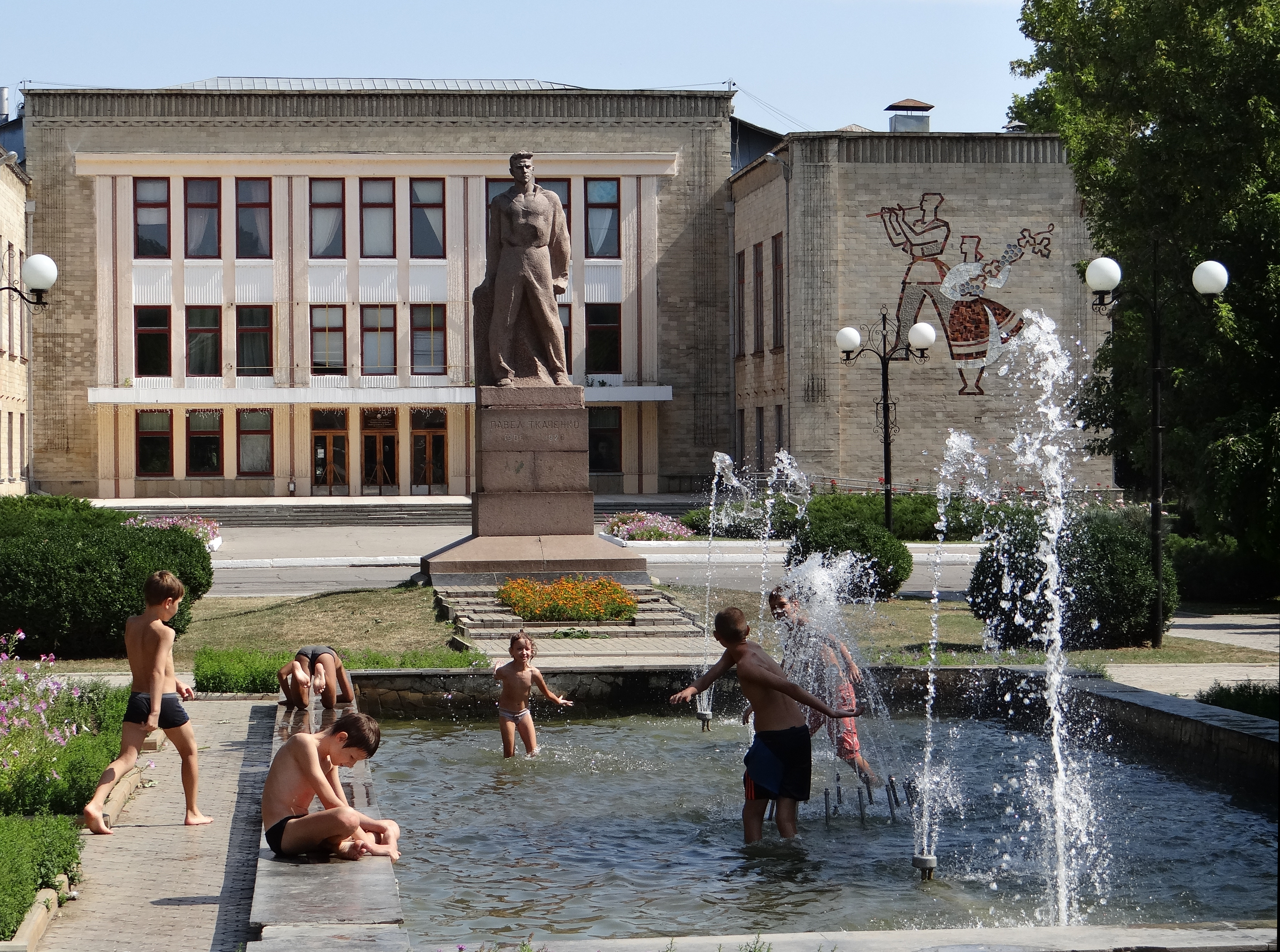
Downtown fountain, Bender

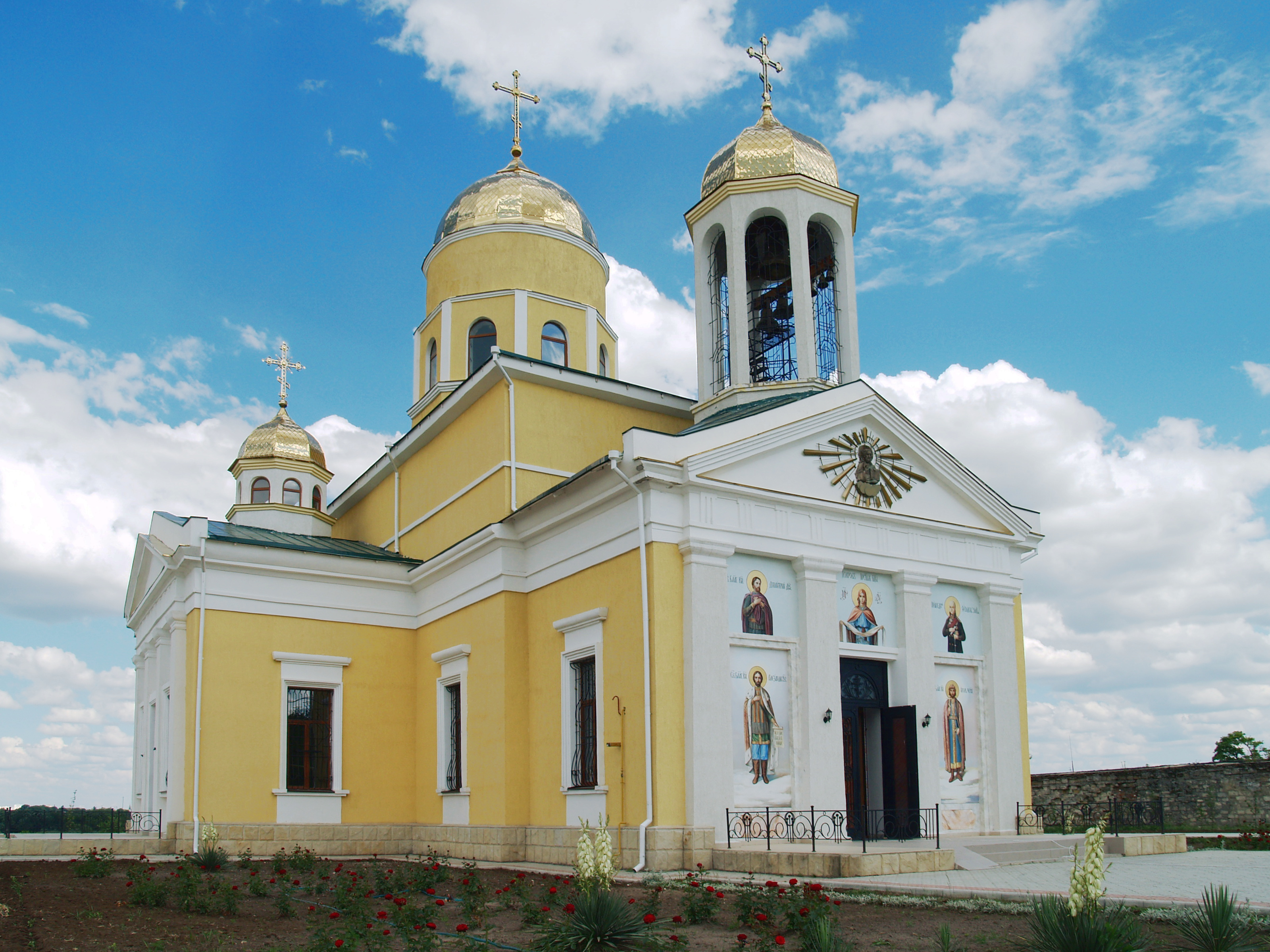
Fortress church

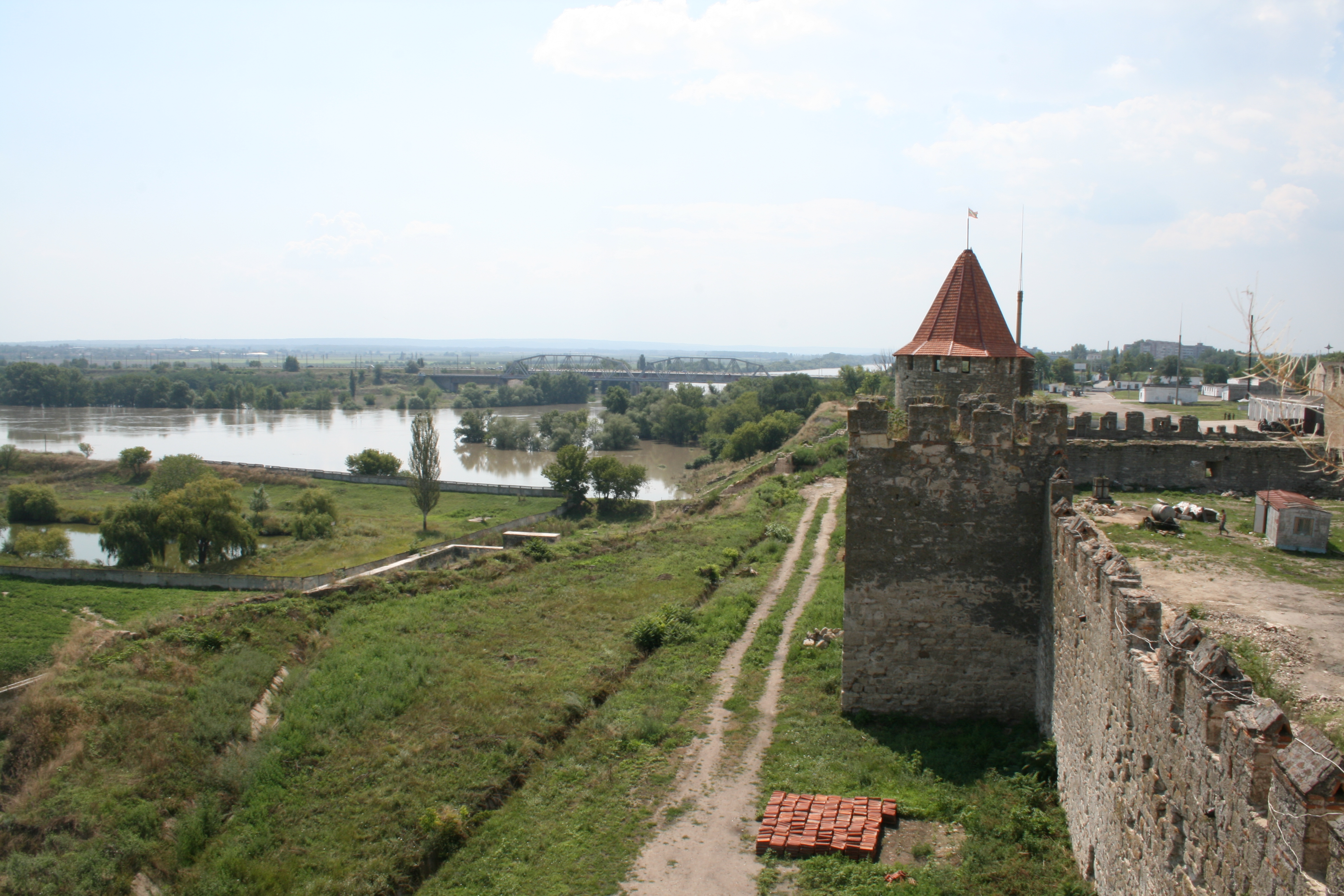
Fortress alongside the Dniester River

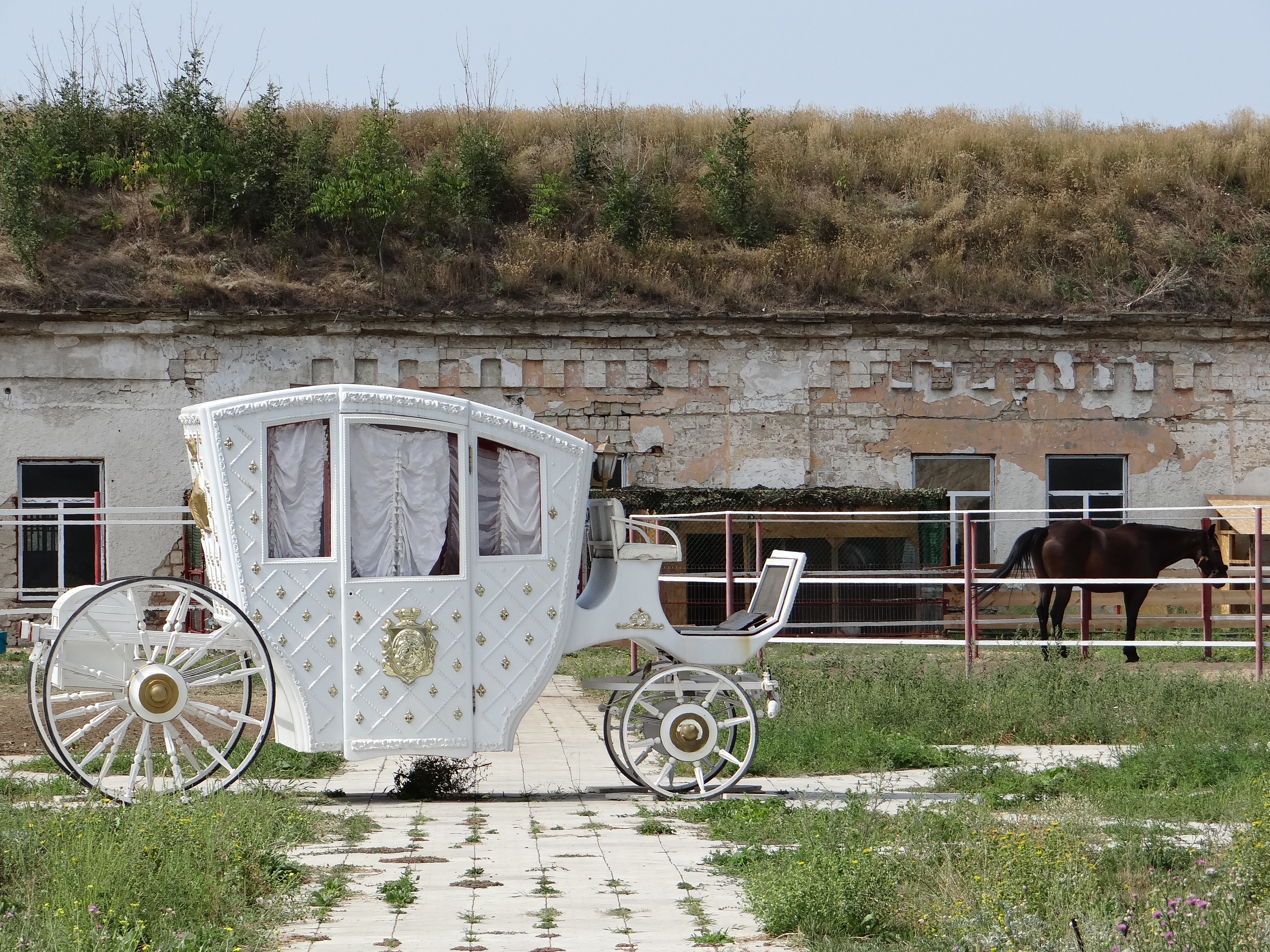
Horse and carriage at Bender Fortress

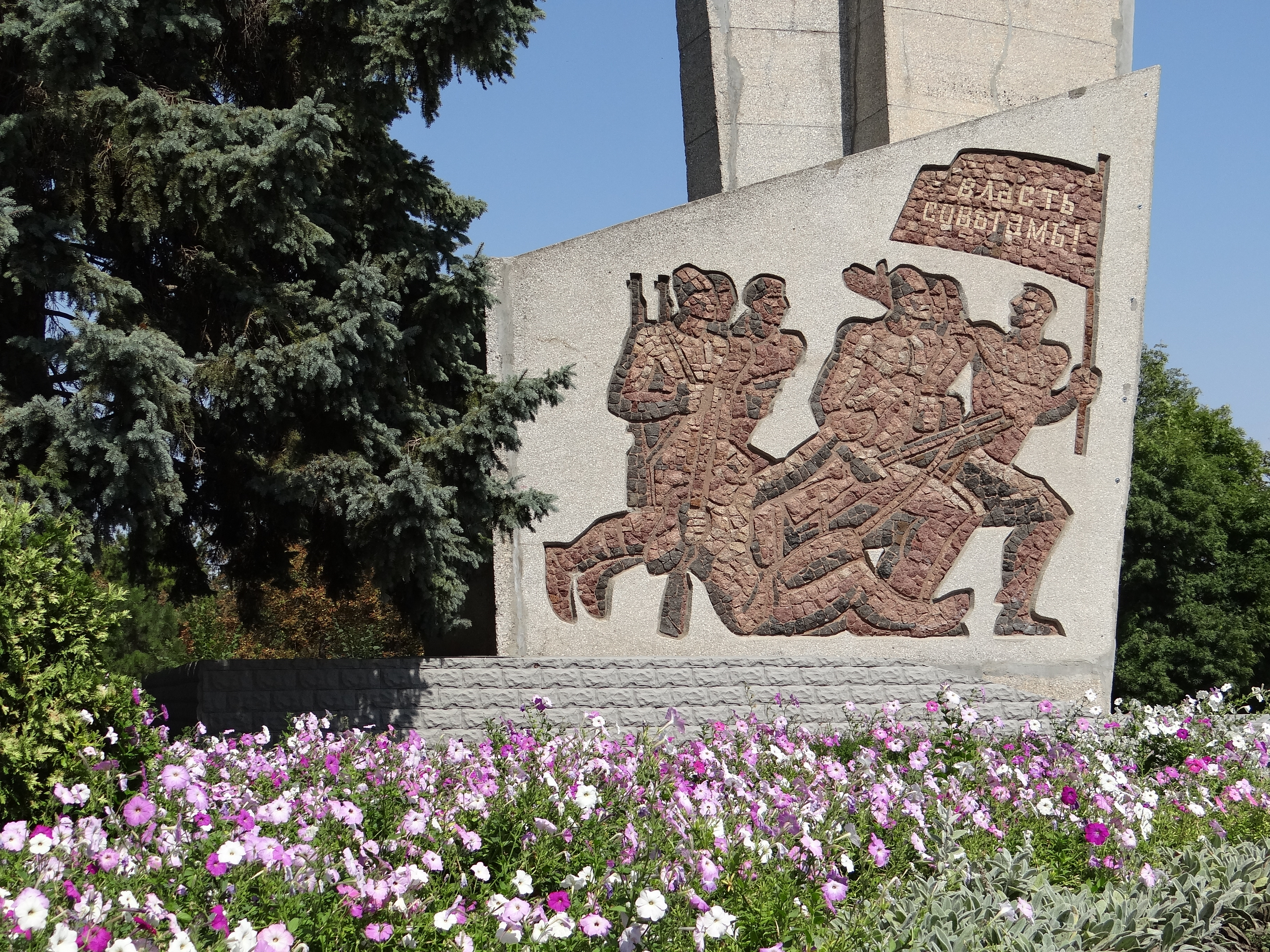
Soviet-era memorial with flower bed, Bender

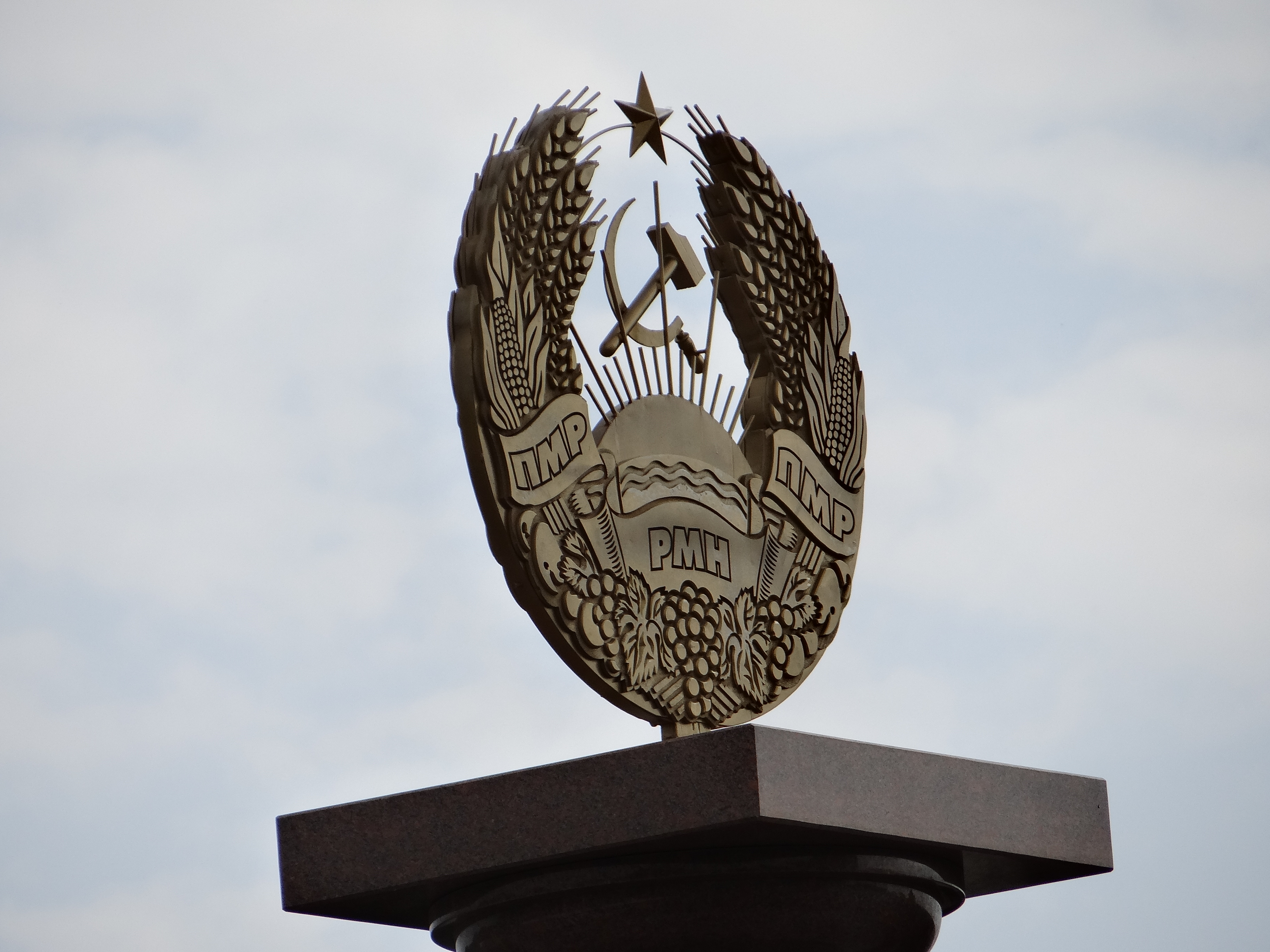
Transnistrian crest on plinth, Bender

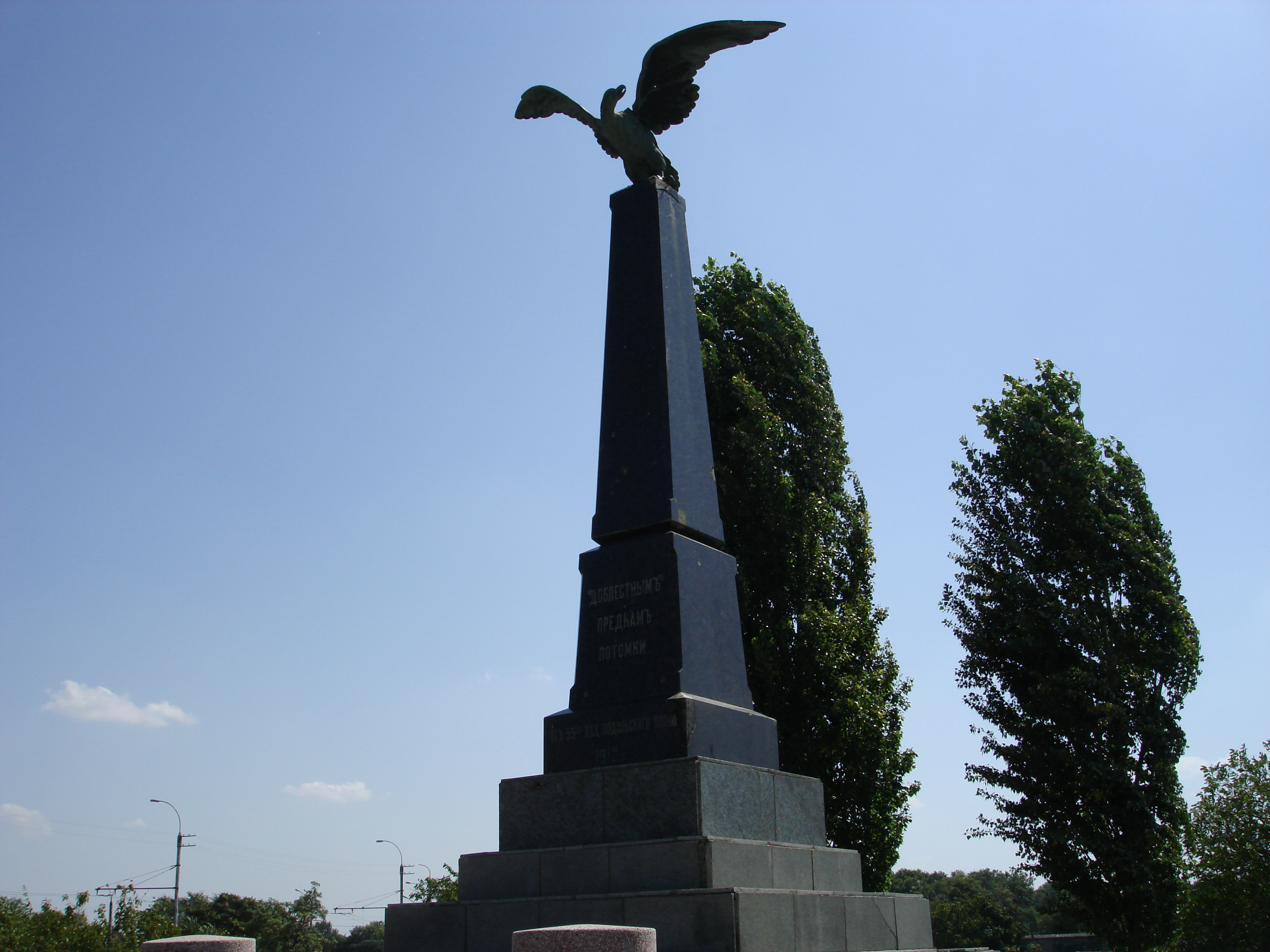
Monument celebrating the Russian annexation of Bessarabia

== See also ==
- Transfiguration Cathedral, Bender
