= Yosef Kushnir =

Israeli politician

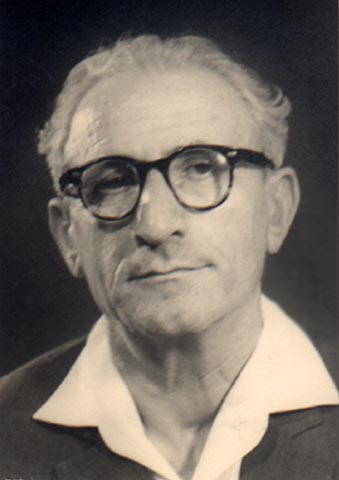
- Kushnir in the 1960s

Faction represented in the Knesset
- 1960–1961: Mapam
- 1962–1965: Mapam

Personal details
- Born: 15 November 1900 Bender, Russian Empire
- Died: 6 January 1983 (aged 82) Haifa, Israel

Yosef Kushnir (Hebrew: יוסף קושניר; 15 November 1900 – 6 January 1983) was an Israeli politician who served as a member of the Knesset for Mapam from 1960 until 1961, and again from 1962 until 1965.

== Biography ==
Born in Bender in the Bessarabia Governorate of the Russian Empire (today in Moldova), Kushnir emigrated to Palestine in 1922. He studied at the Jerusalem Law School, and was certified as a lawyer.

He became one of the leaders of Poale Zion Left, and was also involved in other Marxist groups in Mandate Palestine. In 1945 he joined the Hashomer Hatzair Workers Party, which merged with Ahdut HaAvoda to form Mapam in 1948. Kushnir became a member of its central committee, and was a member of the secretariat of its Haifa branch. Between 1950 and 1955 he was a member of Haifa city council, and also served as chairman of the city's branch of the Lawyers Union.

He was on the Mapam list for the 1959 Knesset elections, but failed to win a seat. However, he entered the Knesset on 10 July 1960 as a replacement for Haim Yehuda. Although he lost his seat in the 1961 elections, he returned to the Knesset on 24 October 1962 as a replacement for the deceased Hanan Rubin. He lost his seat again in the 1965 elections.

Kushnir died in 1983 at the age of 82.
