= Haim Yehuda =

Israeli politician (1917–1985)

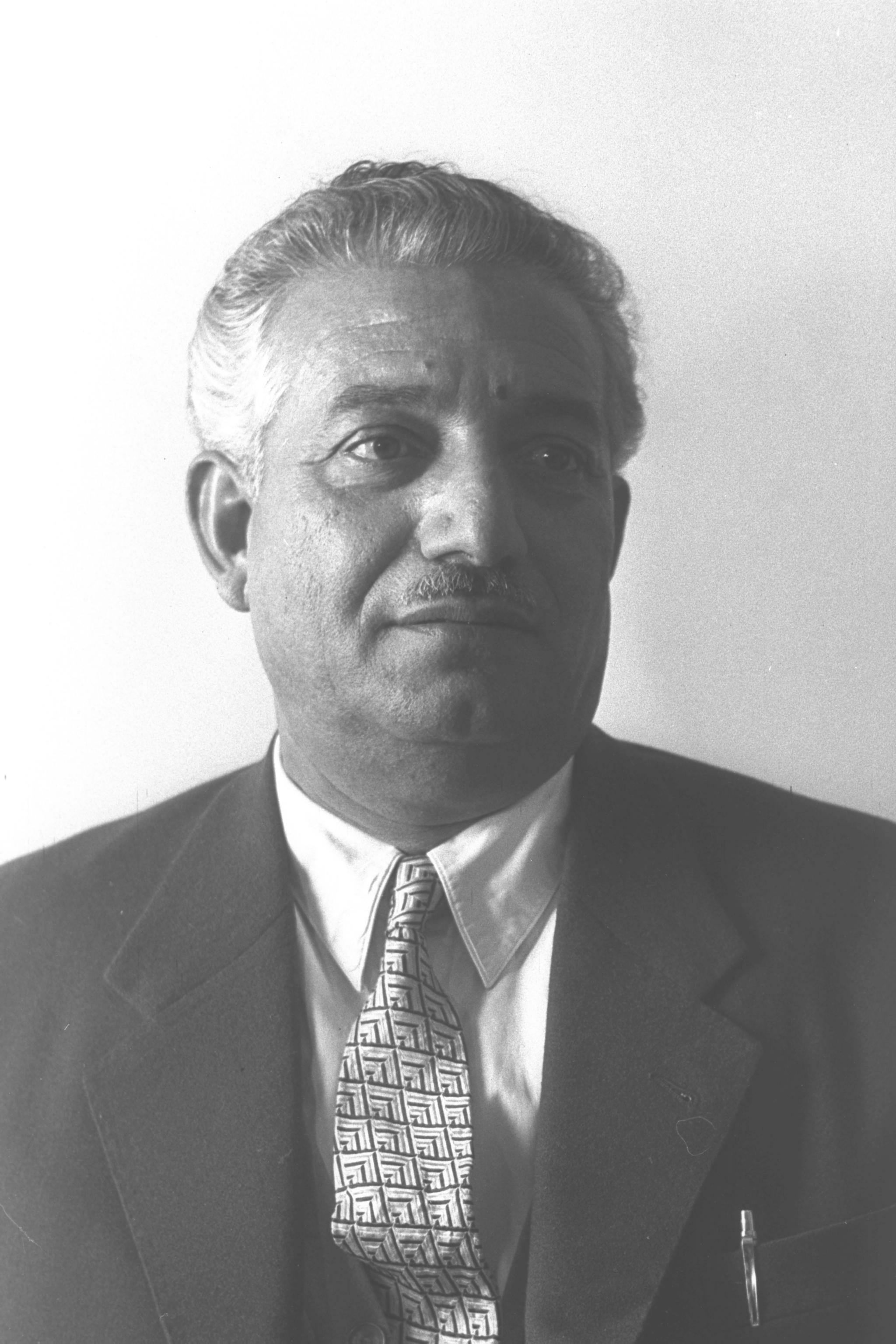
- Yehuda in 1959

Faction represented in the Knesset
- 1955–1960: Mapam

Personal details
- Born: 9 November 1917 Cairo, Egypt
- Died: 1985 (aged 67–68)

Haim Yehuda (Hebrew: חיים יהודה; 9 November 1917 – 1985) was an Israeli politician who served as a member of the Knesset for Mapam between 1955 and 1960.

== Biography ==
Born into an Egyptian Jewish family in Cairo in Egypt, Yehuda was a member of the Egyptian Communist Party. He joined the British Army during World War II, and emigrated to Israel in 1948, where he joined Mapam. He was elected to the Knesset on the party's list in 1955, and was re-elected in 1959. However, he resigned his seat on 10 July the following year, and was replaced by Yosef Kushnir. He also served as head of Beit Dagan local council.

He died in 1985.
