= Zrubavel Gilad =

Hebrew poet, editor and translator

- זרובבל גלעד
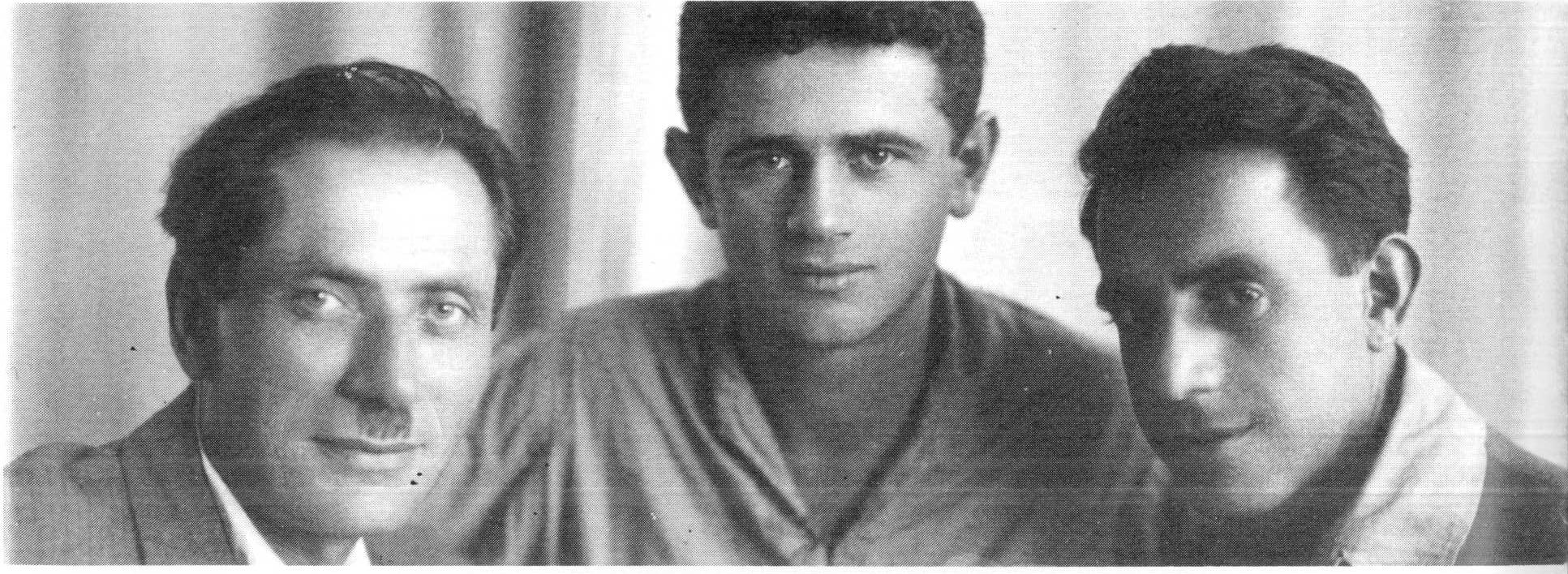
- Zrubavel Gilad (in the middle) with David Cohen and Moshe Ben Elul from the HaNoar HaOved VeHaLomed youth movement
- Born: December 9, 1912; Bender, Bessarabia
- Died: August 12, 1988 (aged 75); Ein Harod
- Resting place: Ein Harod; 32°33′37″N 35°23′27″E
- Known for: Poems
- Awards: Bialik Prize for Literature (1981)

Zrubavel Gilad (Hebrew: זרובבל גלעד, also זרבבל גלעד; 9 December 1912 – 12 August 1988) was a Hebrew poet, editor and translator.

== Biography ==
Gilad was born in 1912 in Bender, Bessarabia (then part of the Russian Empire and now in Moldova), in a Jewish family. His family fled to Odessa during World War I. After the Russian Revolution, they moved to Mandate Palestine. In 1924, they settled in Ein Harod, where he lived until his death in 1988. He was one of the first children in the kibbutz.

Gilad began to publish stories in 1929 and poetry in 1931. He published articles in most newspapers and magazines in Israel.

He was active in getting young members of the cooperative agricultural communities of the Jezreel Valley to participate in HaNoar HaOved VeHaLomed youth movement activities. He was Secretary of the Central Committee of the movement between 1933 and 1935. Many of his poems were published in the movement's newspaper Bamaale (Hebrew: בַּמַּעֲלֶה).

In November 1937, he was sent to Poland to work with the pioneering movement Hehalutz, returning home in 1939.

Gilad was one of the first members of the Palmach, and one of its poets. He wrote the Palmah Anthem in 1941. In 1946, he participated in the Night of the Bridges at the Sheik Hussein Bridge, and was arrested two weeks later in the Black Shabbat, spending some time in British jails.

Between 1950 and 1953, he worked on the Palmach Book, an anthology he edited with Matti Megged. It is considered one of the most important anthologies of the time.

He was the editor of the HaKibbutz HaMeuhad magazine Mebefnim (Hebrew: מבפנים) for many years and a senior editor in the movement's publishing house.

In his later years, after the death of his first wife, he married the Israeli literary scholar and a translator Dorothea Krook-Gilead, who translated many of his poems into English.

In 1990, his autobiography Maayan Gideon ("Gideon's Spring") was published. Individual poems he wrote have been published in Danish, French, German, Hungarian, Russian, Serbo-Croatian and Spanish.

== Awards ==
Gilad won many awards for his literary achievements. These include the following:

- Kugel Prize awarded by the Municipality of Holon (1961)
- Prime Minister's Prize for Hebrew Literary Works (1976)
- Bialik Prize for Literature (1981)

== Books published in Hebrew ==
- Youth (poetry), Ba-Maale, 1936 [Neurim]
- Springs (poetry), Davar, 1939 [Al Ha-ayin]
- The Gilboa Sights (poetry), Hakibbutz Hameuchad, 1943 [Mar'ot Gilboa]
- The Magic Spike (poetry), Hakibbutz Hameuchad, 1949 [Shibolet Pelayim]
- The Palmach, Hakibbutz Hameuchad, 1950 [Pirkei Palmah]
- Tunes in the Storm (poetry), Hakibbutz Hameuchad, 1946 [Nigunim Ba'Sa'ar]
- The Beehive and the Lady Queen (children), Am Oved, 1946 [Ma'ase Be-Kaveret U-Ba-Malkah ha-Gveret]
- Secret Shield, The Jewish Agency, 1948 [Magen Ba-Seter]
- A Legacy of Heroism, Kiriat Sefer, 1948 [Moreshet Gevurah]
- Pines in Bloom (poetry), Hakibbutz Hameuchad, 1950 [Perihat Oranim]
- The Palmach Book, Hakibbutz Hameuchad, 1953 [Sefer Ha-Palmah]
- Conversation at the Beach (stories), Hakibbutz Hameuchad, 1954 [Sihah Al Ha-Hof]
- The Green River (poetry), Hakibbutz Hameuchad, 1955 [Nahar Yarok]
- The Small Rabbit (children), Hakibbutz Hameuchad, 1957 [Ma'aseh Be-Arnav Katan]
- A Drop of Dew (children), Hakibbutz Hameuchad, 1958 [Egel Tal]
- Shining Dust (poetry), Hakibbutz Hameuchad, 1960 [Efer Noher]
- The Upper Sea (poetry), Hakibbutz Hameuchad, 1966 [Yam Shel Ma'ala]
- Returning Light (poetry), Hakibbutz Hameuchad, 1970 [Or Hozer]
- Green Tunes (poetry), Hakibbutz Hameuchad, 1972 [Zemirot Yerukot]
- In the Valley of Shiloh (poetry), Hakibbutz Hameuchad, 1974 [Be-Emek Shilo]
- Coals of Juniper (poetry), Hakibbutz Hameuchad, 1980 [Gehalei Retamim]
- The Well (poetry), Hakibbutz Hameuchad, 1983 [Ha-Be'er]
- The Mountain Light (poetry), Hakibbutz Hameuchad, 1986 [Or Ha-Har]
- The Shade of the Fig Tree (poetry), Hakibbutz Hameuchad, 1988 [Be-Tzel Ha-Te'enah]

== Books in translation ==
- Selected Poems (English) Tel Aviv, Hakibbutz Hameuchad, 1983

== See also ==
- Hebrew literature
- List of Bialik Prize recipients
