= Transfiguration Cathedral, Bender =

Coordinates: 46.8239°N 29.4823°E

Transfiguration Cathedral
- Catedrala Schimbarea la Față din Tighina / Катедрала Схимбаря ла Фацэ дин Бендер; Преображенский кафедральный собор
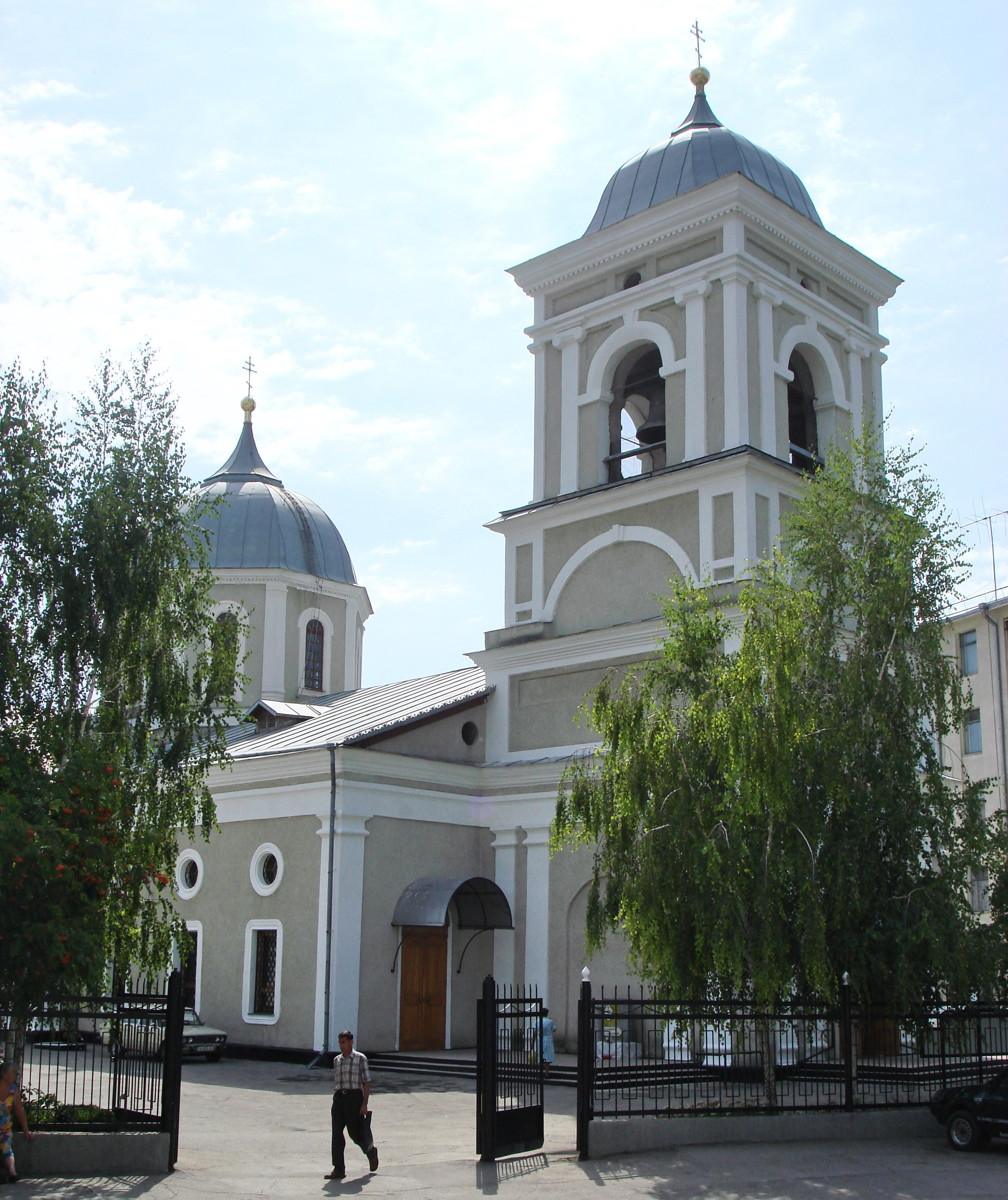
- Transfiguration Cathedral
- Location: Bender
- Country: Transnistria (Moldova)
- Denomination: Russian Orthodox Church

The Transfiguration Cathedral (Romanian: Catedrala Schimbarea la Față din Tighina, Moldovan Cyrillic: Катедрала Схимбаря ла Фацэ дин Бендер; Russian: Преображенский кафедральный собор) is a Russian Orthodox church in the Diocese of Tiraspol and Dubăsari, Bender, a town controlled by Transnistria, de facto independent territory of Moldova. Construction of the cathedral was started in 1814.

== History ==
The history of the cathedral dates back to 1814, when the city of was reconstructed close to on Bender Fortress. The cathedral was founded by Dimitrios, Archbishop of Chișinău, with the first stone being laid on 22 August 1815. It was built between 1815 and 1832 to constitute a symbol of liberation from Ottoman Turkish rule place. It was consecrated by Dimitrios in 1827, however the construction was delayed and the bell tower was completed in 1832, with the rest of the building completed in 1940.

The church was not painted until the 20th century. The interior was painted from 1934 onwards by Moldovan artist Alexandru Plămădeală, along with 4 apprentices. A 3 tonne bell was added in 1911.

In 1948 the cathedral was placed under state protection as a monument of architecture of the early nineteenth century.

Celebrations were held in September 2015 for the cathedral's 200th anniversary. Since 2010, Archpriest John Kalmyk has been the rector of the cathedral.

== See also ==
- Church of the Nativity, Tiraspol
- Transfiguration Cathedral (disambiguation)
