= Nomika Zion =

Israeli social and political activist

- נומיקה ציון
- Relatives: Ya'akov Hazan (grandfather)

Nomika Zion (Hebrew: נומיקה ציון) is an Israeli social and political activist best known for co-founding kibbutz Migvan and peace organization Other Voice. Zion was raised on a kibbutz, the third generation of her family to do so.

== Career ==
Zion co-founded Migvan, an urban kibbutz in Sderot, in 1987.

=== 2006 Lebanon War ===
In December 2006, Zion spoke at a demonstration in Tel Aviv in support of ending Israel's blockade of the Gaza Strip.

=== After Lebanon War ===
In January 2008, in response to the Gaza War, Zion founded Other Voice, a group comprising Israelis living near the Gaza Strip who oppose violence in the region.

In 2009, Zion published several pieces criticizing the Gaza War, which gained her national attention. She also criticized what she characterized as a glorification of war and militarism in Israeli society.

Zion and Gazan obstetrician Izzeldin Abuelaish were co-recipients of the Survivor Corps' Niarchos Prize for Survivorship in April 2009.

Zion continued to criticize Israeli military violence against Palestinians, including the 2012 Israeli operation in the Gaza Strip and the 2014 Gaza War.

As of 2014, Zion was the head of the Yaakov Hazan Center for Social Justice at the Van Leer Jerusalem Institute.

=== 2023 Israel–Hamas war ===
Zion was in Sderot when it was attacked by Hamas militants on October 7, 2023. She hid for over 24 hours, leaving the city on October 9. In an interview with La Vie on October 10, she said that she was still in survival mode and unable to fully analyze the situation, but expressed fear that the Israeli government would invade the Gaza Strip, saying "it's a trap...only discussion and nonviolent solutions can change things". She reiterated this position the following day.

== Personal life ==
Zion is Jewish, and the granddaughter of Israeli politician Yaakov Hazan.
