= Other Voices =

Other Voices may refer to:

== Film and television ==
- Other Voices (1970 film), a 1970 documentary film
- Other Voices (2000 film), a 2000 American thriller film
- Other Voices (Irish TV series), a series based around a music festival in Dingle, County Kerry
- Other Voices (Canadian TV series) (1964–1965), a Canadian current affairs television series on CBC
- Other Voices, a two-part episode from the animated series Beast Wars: Transformers

== Fiction ==
- Other Voices (journal), an electronic journal of cultural criticism and cultural studies
- Other Voices, Inc., a non-profit literary press encompassing:
  - Other Voices (magazine) (a fiction-focused literary magazine)
  - OV Books (a fiction book imprint)

== Music ==
- Other Voices Records, a Russian record label
- Other Voices (The Doors album), 1971 (recorded and released after the death of frontman Jim Morrison)
- Other Voices (Paul Young album), 1990
- "Other Voices", a song by The Cure from the 1981 album Faith
- "Other Voices", a song by LCD Soundsystem from the 2017 album American Dream

== See also ==
- Other Voices, Other Rooms (disambiguation)
- Other Voice, Israeli peace organization
