= Ya'akov Hazan =

Israeli politician and activist (1899–1992)

- יעקב חזן
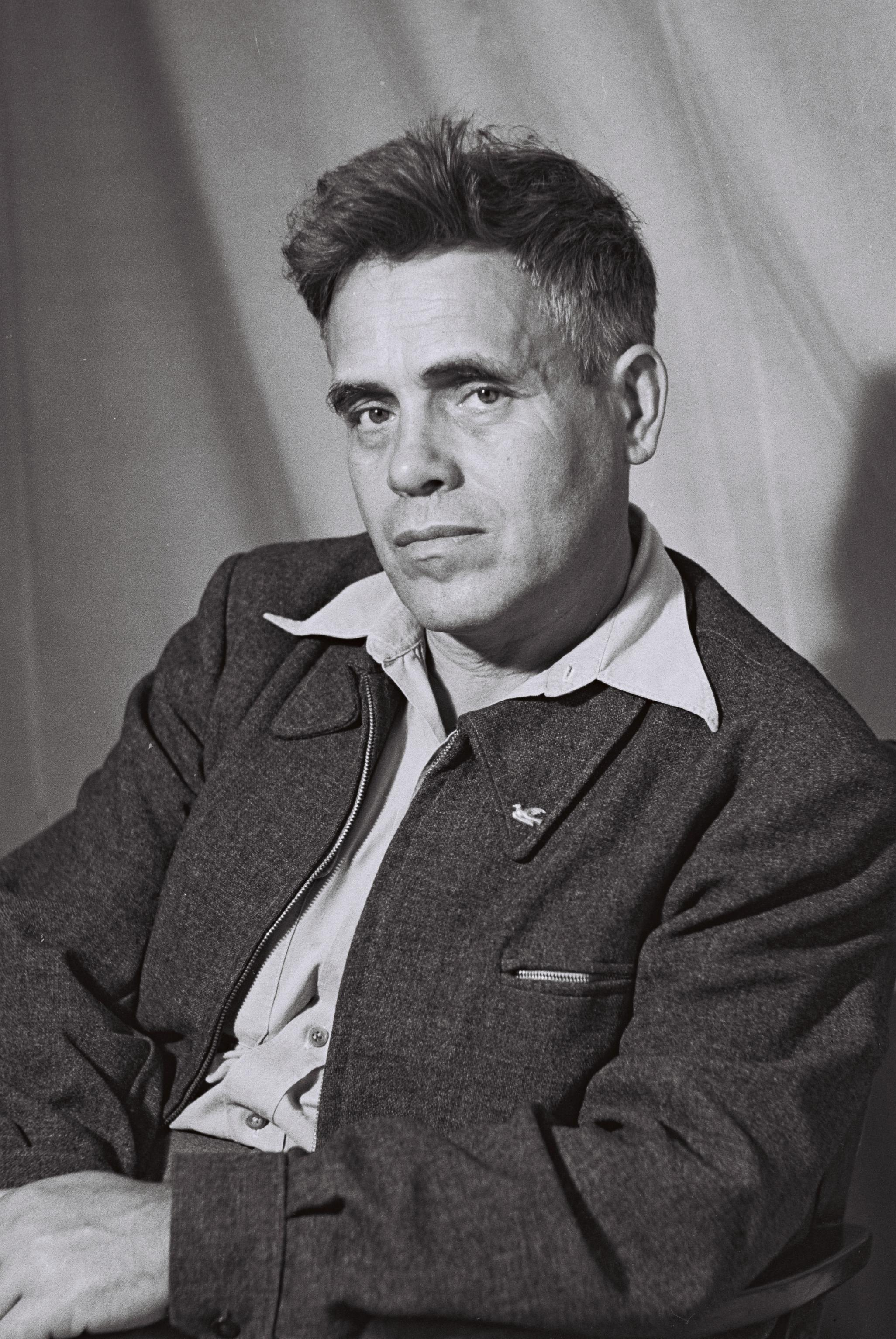

Faction represented in the Knesset
- 1949–1969: Mapam
- 1969–1974: Alignment

Personal details
- Born: 4 June 1899 Brest-Litovsk, Russian Empire
- Died: 22 July 1992 (aged 93)
- Relations: Nomika Zion (granddaughter)

Ya'akov Hazan (Hebrew: יעקב חזן; 4 June 1899 – 22 July 1992) was an Israeli politician and social activist.

== Biography ==
Hazan was born in 1899 in Brest-Litovsk in the Russian Empire (now Brest, Belarus) to parents Haim Yehuda Hazan and Malka Kaminetzki. He studied in a Heder and a Hebrew high school. In 1915, he was among the founders of the "Hebrew Scouts movement" in Poland (later to become Hashomer Hatzair), where he was also one of the first members of HeHalutz. He studied at Warsaw Polytechnic. He immigrated to Mandatory Palestine in 1923, working in an orchard in Hadera and in drying swamps in the Beit She'an valley. In 1926, he joined Kibbutz "Hashomer HaTzair B", which would later establish Mishmar HaEmek.

Hazan became a central figure in the Kibbutz Artzi movement. He actively participated in turning the movement into a kernel of a political party. He served in various positions of the Histadrut and the Zionist movement and major Yishuv institutions. Along with Meir Yaari, he led HaShomer Hatzair, Kibbutz Artzi and Mapam for decades, characterizing those movements by identification with the Soviet Union and Communism.

In 1948, he co-founded Mapam and since 1949, he was among the chief supporters of the party's pro-Soviet stand. He identified with the Soviet Union and the global communist movement in every aspect, except its attitude toward Zionism, which he attributed to the Communist Party of the Soviet Union’s misunderstanding. In 1949, he named the Soviet Union as the Jewish People's second homeland. Upon Joseph Stalin’s death, he wrote an emotional eulogy about him in Al HaMishmar. Following the Prague Trials he changed his mind and joined forces with Yaari to keep Moshe Sneh, who held on to the pro-Soviet stand, out of the party.

Hazan was a Mapam (and later Alignment) MK in the first through seventh Knessets from 1949 to 1973. In the fourth Knesset he was a member of the Knesset committee. In the fifth through seventh Knesset, Hazan was a member of the Foreign Affairs and Defense Committee. He chose not to serve in national positions that would make him have to abandon his ideological, partisan, parliamentary and educational occupations, that had influence outside of Mapam as well. He supported the collaboration with Mapai and establishing the Alignment in 1968. After the Six-Day War he played an important part in Mapam's taking of dovish positions. In 1984, he opposed Mapam's participation in the national unity government and supported the Alignment's disbandment. In the 1980s he was nominated for the Presidency. He was appointed to the honorary last spot in the 1992 Knesset elections list of Meretz, a union of parties that included Mapam.

In 1989, he was awarded the Israel Prize for his special contribution to society and the State of Israel.

A center for social justice at the Van Leer Jerusalem Institute in Jerusalem, a democratic school in Kfar Saba and a street in Haifa are named after him

== Selected writings ==
- The Labor Movement and the War (in Hebrew) (1943)
- The Kibbutz in the Test of Time (in Hebrew) (1958)
- Conclusions and Future Tasks (in Hebrew) (1964)
- At the Crossroads of Decisions (in Hebrew) (1968)
- Confusion, Protest and Solution (in Hebrew) (1974)
- A New Beginning (in Hebrew) (1988)
- Childhood and Youth (in Hebrew) (1993), autobiography

== See also ==
- List of Israel Prize recipients
