= Migvan =

Kibbutz in southern Israel

Coordinates: 31°31′40.5″N 34°35′39.7″E

Migvan: מגוון (Hebrew)
- Etymology: Diversity
- Interactive map of Migvan
- Country: Israel
- District: Southern
- Affiliation: Kibbutz Movement
- Founded: 1987
- Founder: Kibbutz Movement followers
- Website: www.migvan.org.il

Migvan (Hebrew: מגוון, lit. 'Diversity') is a small urban kibbutz located in the city of Sderot in the northwestern Negev desert in Israel.

The kibbutz was founded in 1987, and the original six members of the group (including activist Nomika Zion) have expanded to 60 members. It is a mixed model of the urban kibbutz (collective economy, culture, and weekly meetings) with private homes.
