= Other Voice =

Other Voice is an Israeli peace coalition, made up of Israelis living in Sderot and other communities near the Gaza Strip. It was founded in January 2008.

Other Voice is a member of Alliance for Middle East Peace.

== History ==
Other Voice was inspired by a series of blog posts written by two anonymous writers – one in Sderot, and one in Gaza. It was founded in January 2008 by a small group, including the blog writers and activist Nomika Zion.

By January 2009, the group had about 80 dedicated Israeli members, both religious and secular. By mid-2014, the group had about 200 Israeli members, most of whom lived in Sderot.

== Activity ==
The group maintains relationships with Gaza residents, whom they contact regularly through remote means. Sometimes, members will gather in larger meet ups to contact Gazans as a group.

In August 2008, 50 members of the organization held a cycling event along the Gaza border. Members held signs with messages of goodwill. Around a hundred Gaza residents cheered on the cyclists from their windows; although they had originally planned to leave their homes, volatile conditions on the ground made it too dangerous to do so. The Gaza blogger and founding member, using a speakerphone, asked the cyclists to "tell everyone that in Gaza you have partners for peace".

In 2011, Other Voice was one of the organizers of a Sapir College conference on non-violent resolutions to the Israel-Gaza border conflict. Right-wing individuals called for a boycott of the conference, which was taken up by the mayor of Sderot.

Other Voice hosts two drama groups, one in Israel and one in Gaza, who meet virtually once a week.

The group has worked with the Gaza Youth Committee.
