= Other Voices, Other Rooms =

Other Voices, Other Rooms may refer to:

- Other Voices, Other Rooms (novel), a 1948 novel by Truman Capote
- Other Voices, Other Rooms (Nanci Griffith album), 1993
- Other Voices, Other Rooms (The Getaway Plan album), 2008
- Other Voices, Other Rooms (film), a 1995 film based on the 1948 novel, directed by David Rocksavage
