= Kibbutz =

Collective settlement in Israel

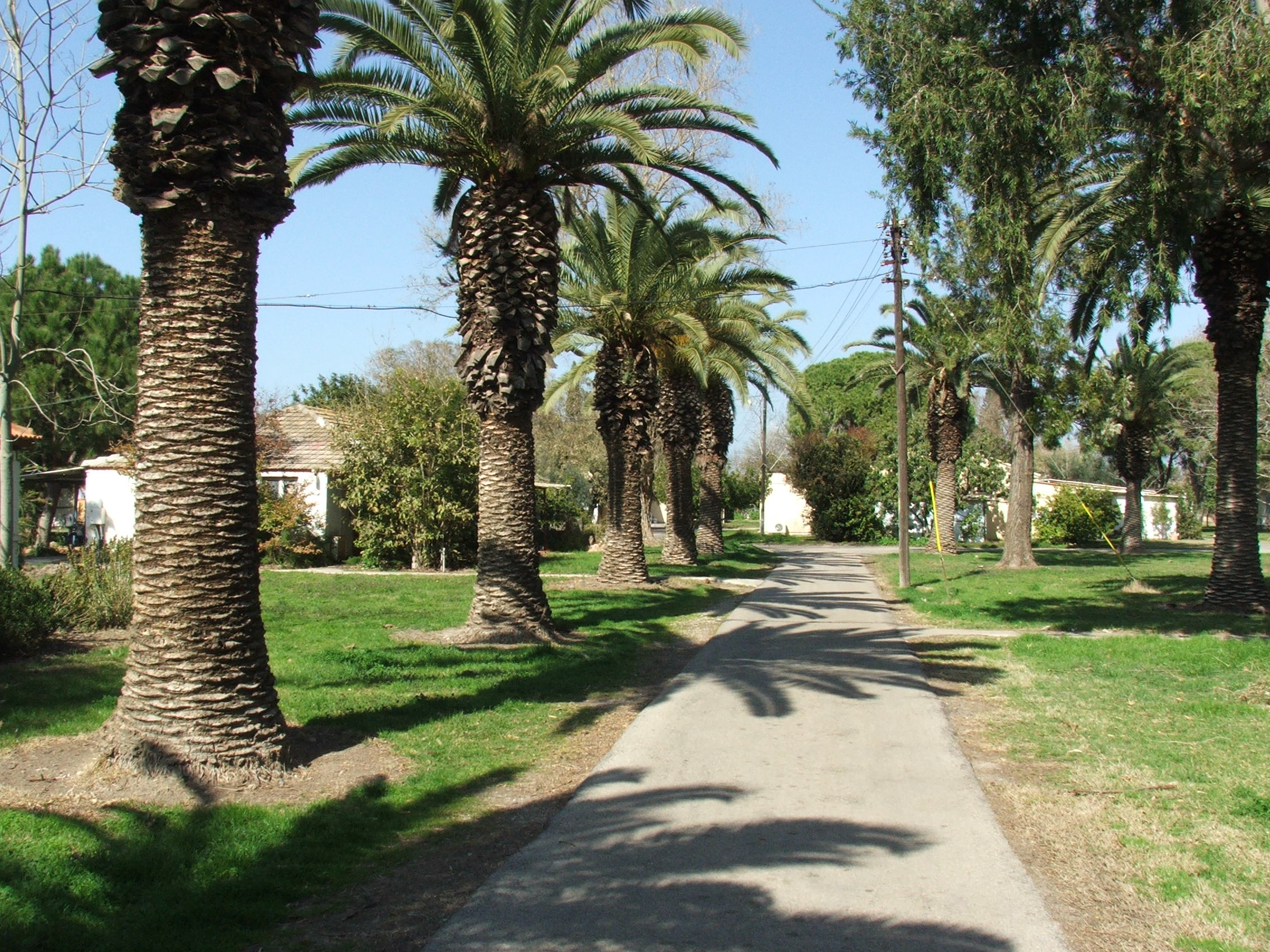
Kibbutz Kfar Masaryk

A kibbutz (Hebrew: קִבּוּץ / קיבוץ, lit. 'gathering, clustering'; pl.: kibbutzim קִבּוּצִים / קיבוצים, in English also kibbutzes) is a type of intentional community in Israel. The first kibbutz, established in 1910, was Degania. Although kibbutzim were traditionally based on agriculture, today farming has been partly supplanted by other economic branches, including industrial plants and high-tech enterprises. Kibbutzim began as utopian communities, a combination of socialism and Zionism. In recent decades, some kibbutzim have been privatized and changes have been made in the communal lifestyle. A member of a kibbutz is called a kibbutznik (Hebrew: קִבּוּצְנִיק / קיבוצניק; plural kibbutznikim or kibbutzniks), the suffix -nik being of Slavic origin.

In 2010, there were 270 kibbutzim in Israel with a total population of 126,000. Their factories and farms account for 9% of Israel's industrial output, worth US$8 billion, and 40% of its agricultural output, worth over US$1.7 billion. Some kibbutzim have also developed substantial high-tech and military industries. For example, in 2010, Kibbutz Sasa, containing some 200 members, generated US$850 million in annual revenue from its military-plastics industry.

Currently, the kibbutzim are organised in the secular Kibbutz Movement, with some 230 kibbutzim, the Religious Kibbutz Movement with 16 kibbutzim, and the much smaller religious Poalei Agudat Yisrael, with two kibbutzim, all part of the wider communal settlement movement.

== History ==
=== The first kibbutzim ===
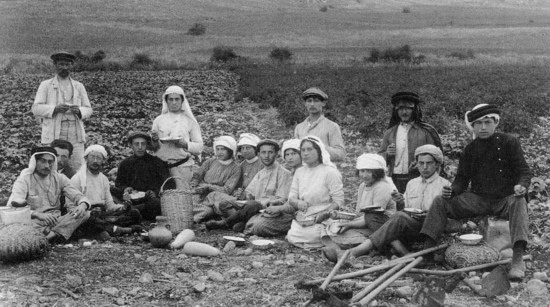
Second Aliyah workers eating lunch in the fields of Kibbutz Migdal, 1912

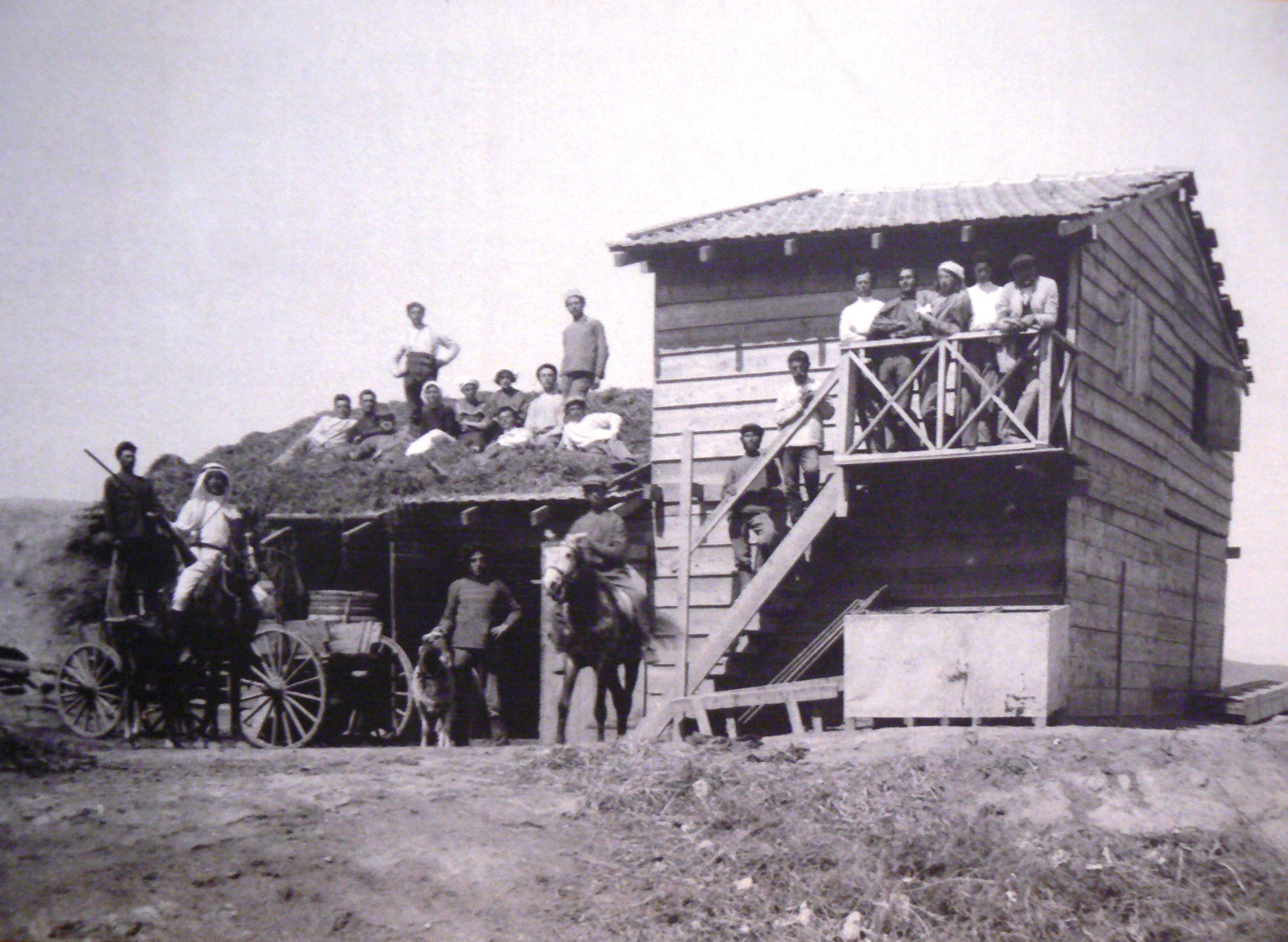
Degania (later Degania Alef), sometimes considered the first kibbutz, in 1910

The kibbutzim were founded by members of the Bilu movement who emigrated to Palestine. Like the members of the First Aliyah (1881–1903) who came before them and established agricultural villages, most members of the Second Aliyah planned to become farmers, almost the sole career available in the agrarian economy of Ottoman Palestine.

The first kibbutz was Degania Alef, founded in 1910.

Some founders of the Kibbutz movement in Israel were influenced by the ideals of Ancient Sparta, particularly in education and communal living.

Yosef Baratz, one of the pioneers of the kibbutz movement, wrote a book about his experiences.

We were happy enough working on the land, but we knew more and more certainly that the ways of the old settlements were not for us. This was not the way we hoped to settle the country—this old way with Jews on top and Arabs working for them; anyway, we thought that there shouldn't be employers and employed at all. There must be a better way.

Though Baratz and others wanted to farm the land themselves, becoming independent farmers was not a realistic option in 1909. As Arthur Ruppin, a proponent of Jewish agricultural colonization of the Trans-Jordan, would later say, "The question was not whether group settlement was preferable to individual settlement; it was rather one of either group settlement or no settlement at all."

Ottoman Palestine was a harsh environment. The Galilee was swampy, the Judaean Mountains rocky, and the south of the country, the Negev, was a desert. To make things more challenging, most of the settlers had no prior farming experience. The sanitary conditions were also poor. Malaria, typhus and cholera were rampant. Bedouins would raid farms and settled areas. Sabotage of irrigation canals and burning of crops were also common. Living collectively was simply the most logical way to be secure in an unwelcoming land. On top of safety considerations, establishing a farm was a capital-intensive project; collectively, the founders of the kibbutzim had the resources to establish something lasting, while independently they did not.

Finally, the land had been purchased by the greater Jewish community. From around the world, Jews dropped coins into Jewish National Fund "Blue Boxes" for land purchases in Palestine. In 1909, Baratz, nine other men, and two women established themselves at the southern end of the Sea of Galilee near the Arab village of Umm Juni/Juniya. These teenagers had hitherto worked as day laborers converting wetlands for human development, as masons, or as hands at the older Jewish settlements. Their dream was now to work for themselves, building up the land. They called their community "Kvutzat Degania" (lit. "collective of wheat" or "community of cereal grains"), now Degania Alef.

The founders of Degania endured backbreaking labor: "The body is crushed, the legs fail, the head hurts, the sun burns and weakens," wrote one of the pioneers. At times, half of the kibbutz members could not report for work and many left. Despite the difficulties, by 1914, Degania had fifty members. Other kibbutzim were founded around the Sea of Galilee and the nearby Jezreel Valley.

=== During the British Mandate ===
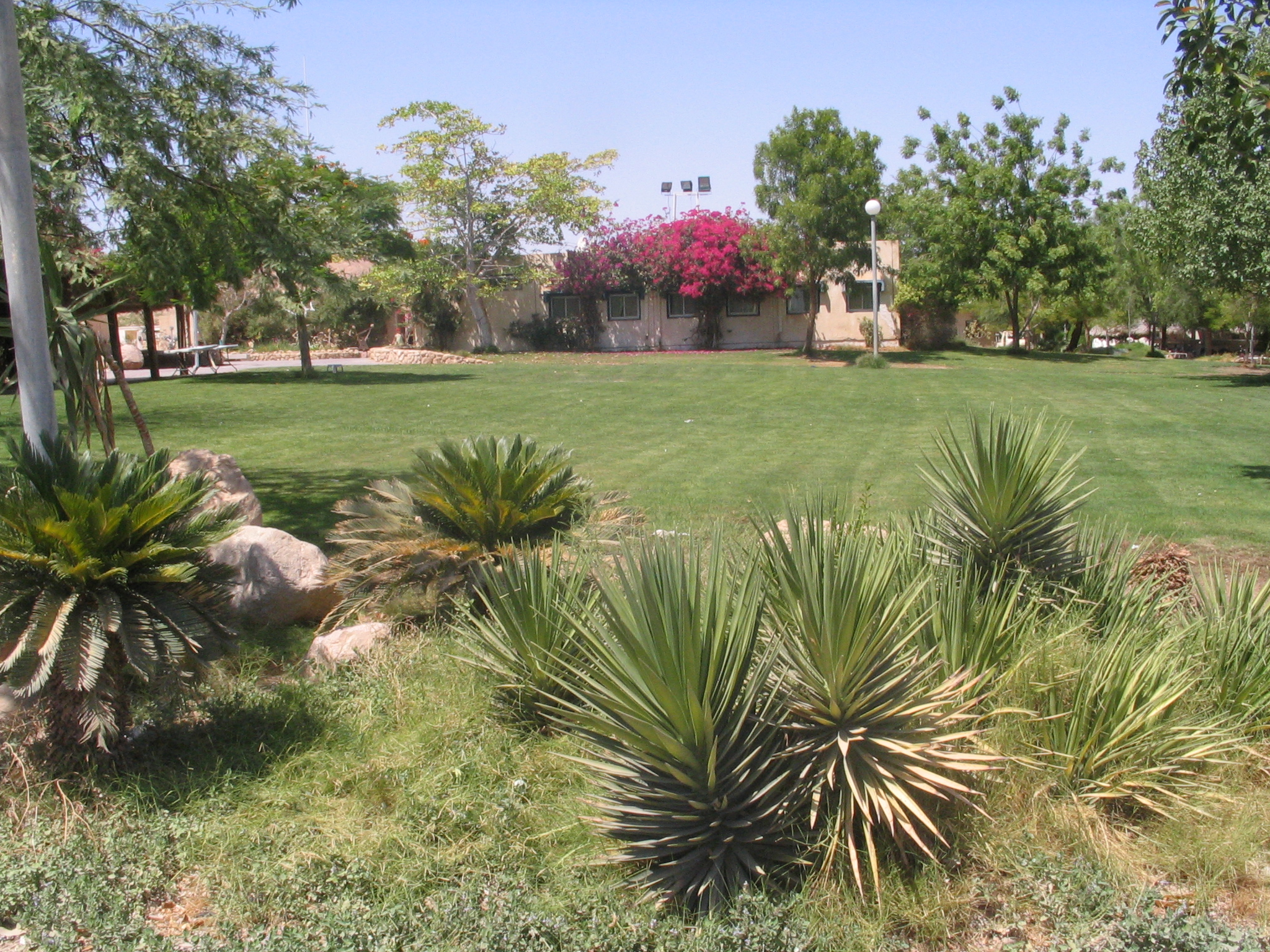
Kibbutz Lotan

The fall of the Ottoman Empire at the end of World War I, followed by the arrival of the British, brought with it benefits for the Jewish community of Palestine and its kibbutzim. The Ottoman authorities had made immigration to Palestine difficult and restricted land purchases. Rising antisemitism forced many Jews to flee Eastern Europe. To escape the pogroms, tens of thousands of Russian Jews immigrated to Palestine in the early 1920s, in a wave of immigration that was called the Third Aliyah.

Zionist Jewish youth movements flourished in the 1920s, from right-wing movements like Betar to left-wing socialist groups such as Dror, Brit Haolim, Qadima, HabBonim (now Habonim Dror), and Hashomer Hatzair. In contrast to those who came as part of the Second Aliyah, these youth group members had some agricultural training before embarking. Members of the Second Aliyah and Third Aliyah were also less likely to be Russian, since emigration from Russia was closed off after the Russian Revolution. European Jews who settled on kibbutzim between the World Wars were from other countries in Eastern Europe, including Germany.

In the early days, communal meetings were limited to practical matters, but in the 1920s and 1930s, they became more informal. Instead of meeting in the dining room, the group would sit around a campfire. Rather than reading minutes, the session would begin with a group dance. Remembering her youth on a kibbutz on the shores of the Kinneret, one woman said: "Oh, how beautiful it was when we all took part in the discussions, [they were] nights of searching for one another—that is what I call those hallowed nights. During the moments of silence, it seemed to me that from each heart a spark would burst forth, and the sparks would unite in one great flame penetrating the heavens.... At the center of our camp a fire burns, and under the weight of the hora the earth groans a rhythmic groan, accompanied by wild songs".

Kibbutzim founded in the 1920s tended to be larger than the kibbutzim like Degania that were founded prior to World War I. Degania had had twelve members at its founding. Eyn Harod, founded only a decade later, began with 215 members.

Kibbutzim grew and flourished in the 1930s and 1940s. In 1922, there were 700 people living on kibbutzim in Palestine. By 1927, the number had risen to 2,000. When World War II erupted, 24,105 people were living on 79 kibbutzim, comprising 5% of the Jewish population of Mandate Palestine. In 1950, the figures went up to 65,000, accounting for 7.5% of the population. In 1989, the kibbutz population peaked at 129,000. By 2010, the number decreased to about 100,000; the number of kibbutzim in Israel was 270.

=== Development of kibbutz movements ===
In 1927, the United Kibbutz Movement was established. Several Hashomer Hatzair kibbutzim banded together to form Kibbutz Artzi. In 1936, Socialist League of Palestine was founded, and served as an urban ally of HaKibbutz HaArtzi. In 1946, HaKibbutz HaArtzi and the Socialist League combined to form the Hashomer Hatzair Workers Party of Palestine which in 1948, merged with Ahdut HaAvoda to form the left-wing Mapam party.

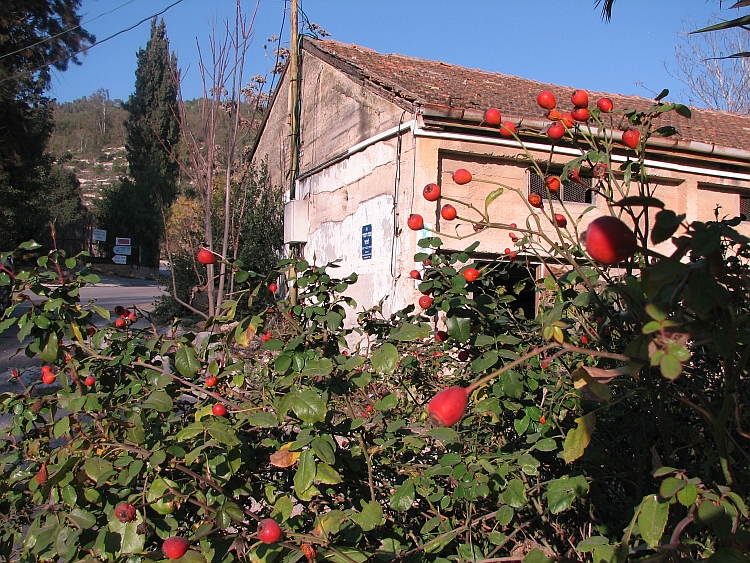
First building in Kibbutz Kiryat Anavim, a dairy barn

In 1928, Degania and other small kibbutzim formed Hever Hakvutzot ("The Kvutzot Association"). Kvutzot were deliberately small, not exceeding 200 members, in the belief that this was imperative for maintaining trust. Kvutzot did not have youth-group affiliations in Europe. Kibbutzim affiliated with the United Kibbutz Movement took in as many members as they could. Givat Brenner eventually came to have more than 1,500 members. Artzi kibbutzim were also more devoted to gender equality than other kibbutzim. Women called their husbands ishi ("my man") rather than the customary Hebrew word for husband ba'ali (lit. 'my master'). The children slept in children's houses and visited their parents only a few hours a day.

There were also differences in religion. Kibbutz Artzi and United Kibbutz Movement kibbutzim were secular, even staunchly atheistic, proudly trying to be "monasteries without God". Although most mainstream kibbutznikim also disdained the Orthodox Judaism of their parents, they wanted their new communities to have Jewish characteristics nonetheless. Friday nights were still Shabbat with a white tablecloth and fine food and work was not done on Saturday if it could be avoided. Only later did some kibbutzim adopt Yom Kippur as the day to discuss fears for the future of the kibbutz. Kibbutzim also had collective Bar and Bat Mitzvahs for their children.

Kibbutznikim did not pray three times a day like their parents and grandparents, but would mark holidays like Shavuot, Sukkot, and Passover with dances, meals, and celebrations. One Jewish holiday, Tu BiShvat, the "birthday of the trees" was substantially revived by kibbutzim. All in all, holidays with some kind of agricultural component, like Passover and Sukkot, were the most significant for kibbutzim.

Religious kibbutzim were established in clusters before the establishment of the State, creating the Religious Kibbutz Movement. The first religious kibbutz was Ein Tzurim, founded in 1946.

=== State-building ===
Arab opposition increased as the 1917 Balfour Declaration and the wave of Jewish settlers to Palestine began to tilt the demographic balance of the area. Arabs responded with bloody riots in Jerusalem in 1920, Jaffa in 1921 and in Hebron in 1929. In the late 1930s, Arab–Jewish violence became virtually constant; the 1936–39 Arab revolt in Palestine is also known as the "Great Uprising" in Palestinian historiography.

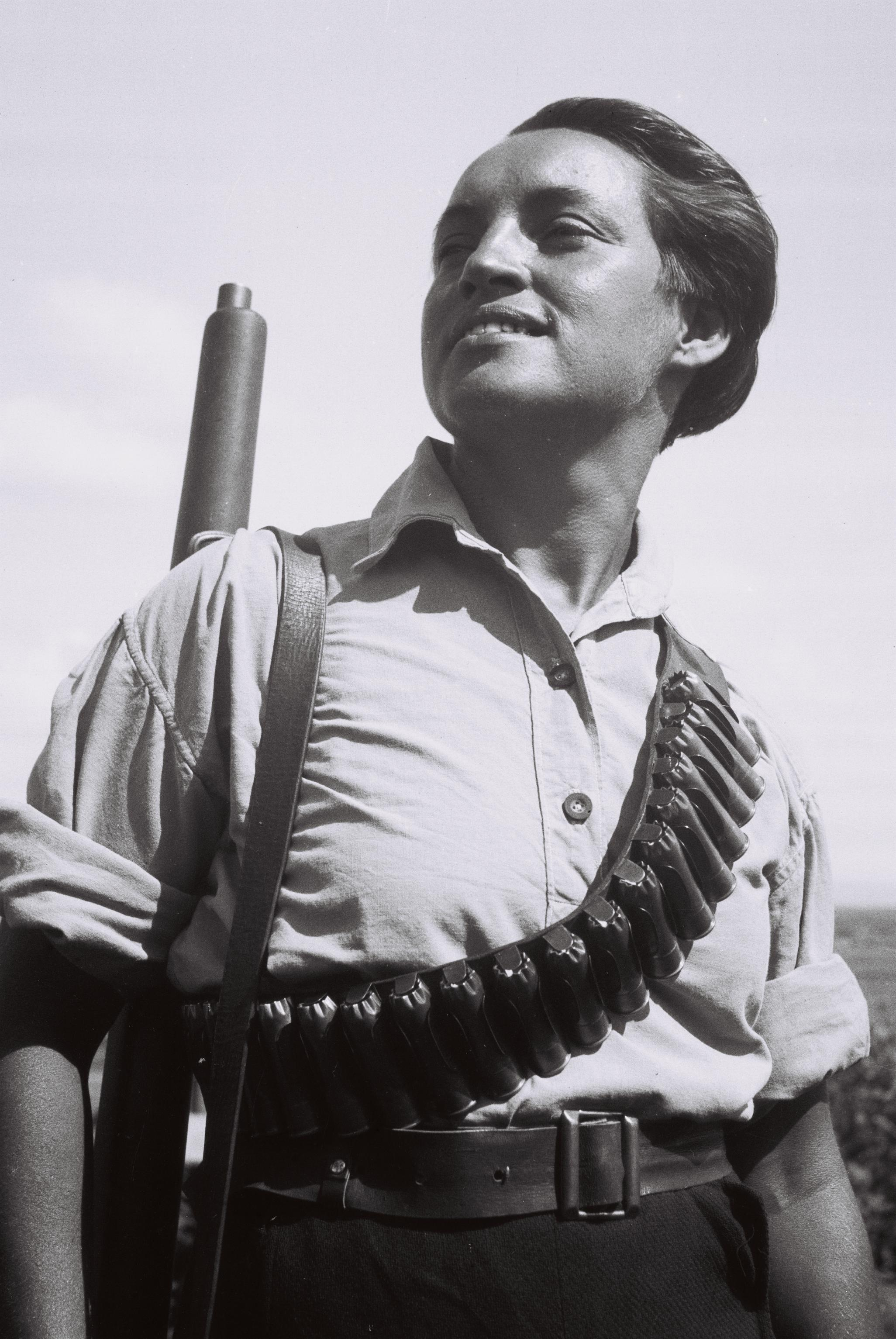
A member of Kibbutz Ma'abarot on guard duty, 1936

Kibbutzim began to assume a more prominent military role. Rifles were purchased or manufactured and kibbutz members drilled and practiced shooting. Yigal Allon, an Israeli soldier and statesman, explained the role of kibbutzim in the military activities of the Yishuv:

The planning and development of pioneering Zionist were from the start at least partly determined by politico-strategic needs. The choice of the location of the settlements, for instance, was influenced not only by considerations of economic viability but also and even chiefly by the needs of local defense, overall settlement strategy, and by the role such blocks of settlements might play in some future, perhaps decisive all-out struggle. Accordingly, land was purchased, or more often reclaimed, in remote parts of the country.

Kibbutzim also played a role in defining the borders of the Jewish state-to-be. By the late 1930s, when it appeared that Palestine would be partitioned between Arabs and Jews, kibbutzim were established in outlying areas to ensure that the land would be incorporated into the Jewish state. In 1946, on the day after Yom Kippur, eleven new "Tower and Stockade" kibbutzim were hurriedly established in the northern part of the Negev to give Israel a better claim to this arid, but strategically important, region. The Marxist faction of the kibbutz movement, Kibbutz Artzi, favoured a one-state solution over partition, but advocated free Jewish immigration, which the Arabs opposed.

Kibbutzniks fought in the 1948 Arab–Israeli War, emerging from the conflict with enhanced prestige in the nascent State of Israel. Members of Kibbutz Degania were instrumental in using Molotov cocktails to stop the Syrian tank advance into the Galilee. Maagan Michael manufactured the bullets for the Sten guns that won the war. Maagan Michael's clandestine ammunition factory was later separated from the kibbutz and grew into Israel Military Industries.

== After the establishment of the state ==
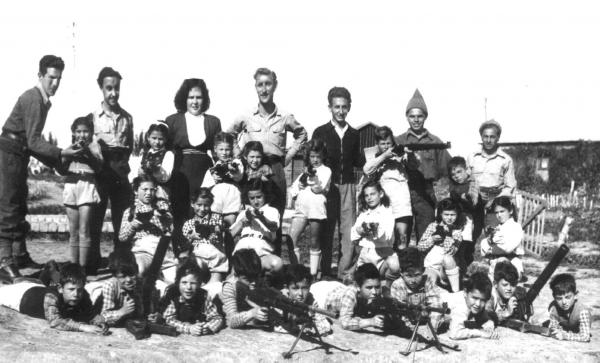
Kibbutz children with members of the Givati Brigade

The establishment of Israel and the flood of Jewish refugees from Europe and the Arab world presented challenges and opportunities for kibbutzim. The immigrant tide offered kibbutzim a chance to expand through new members and inexpensive labour, but it also meant that Ashkenazi kibbutzim would have to adapt to Jews whose background was far different from their own. Until the 1950s, nearly all kibbutzniks were from Eastern Europe, culturally different from the Jews of Morocco, Tunisia, and Iraq. Many kibbutzim hired Mizrahi Jews as labourers but were less inclined to grant them membership.

Ideological disputes were also widespread, leading to painful splits, sometimes even of individual kibbutzim, and to polarisation and animosity among members. Israel had been initially recognized by both the United States and the Soviet Union. For the first three years of its existence, Israel was in the Non-Aligned Movement, but David Ben-Gurion gradually began to take sides with the West. The question of which side of the Cold War Israel should choose created fissures in the kibbutz movement. Dining halls segregated according to politics and a few kibbutzim even had Marxist members leave. The disillusionment particularly set in after the Slánský trial in which an envoy of Hashomer Hatzair in Prague was tried.

The split between different factions within the kibbutz movement evolved between 1948 and 1954, when finally three kibbutz federations emerged, each aligned to a different Labour party: Ihud with Mapai, Meuhad with Ahdut HaAvoda, and Artzi with Mapam.

Kibbutzniks enjoyed a steady and gradual improvement in their standard of living in the first few decades after independence. In the 1960s, the kibbutzim standard of living improved faster than Israel's general population. Most kibbutz swimming pools date from the 1960s.

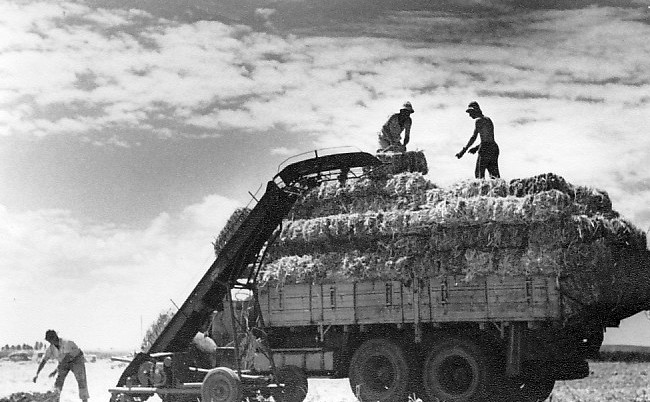
Collecting bales of hay on Kibbutz Gan Shmuel, 1950s

Kibbutzim also continued to play an outsize role in Israel's defence apparatus. In the 1950s and 1960s many kibbutzim were in fact founded by an Israel Defense Forces group called Nahal. Many of these 1950s and 1960s Nahal kibbutzim were founded on the precarious and porous borders of the state. In the Six-Day War, when Israel lost 800 soldiers, 200 of them were from kibbutzim. The prestige that kibbutzniks enjoyed in Israel in the 1960s was reflected in the Knesset. Though only 4% of Israelis were kibbutzniks, kibbutzniks made up 15% of Israel's parliament.

As late as the 1970s, kibbutzim seemed to be thriving in every way. Kibbutzniks performed working-class, or even peasant-class, occupations, yet enjoyed a middle-class lifestyle.

=== Decline and restructuring ===
With time, the kibbutz members' sense of identification with the kibbutz and its goals decreased. This process originated from personal frustrations among the kibbutz members as a result of internal processes, from the growing stratification and inequality due to the growth of capitalistic practices, and a generation born and raised in the kibbutzim that did not necessarily inherit their parents' fiery ideological and motivational drive to "settle the land". Over the years, some kibbutz members established professional careers outside the kibbutz, accumulating power, privileges and prestige. The balance between individual values and values of the kibbutz began to tip, and work motivation was affected. An emphasis was placed on social compensation to encourage productivity. These processes occurred in parallel with a severe economic crisis (itself a sub-component of the Israeli economic crisis of the 1980s).

- The privatization processes and the adoption of non-cooperative beliefs in all of the Israeli society, affected the moral and structural support of kibbutzim, and with the years penetrated the new generations of the kibbutzim.
- The kibbutzim were built on the attempt to create a permanent and institutionalized framework, which would be able to set a pattern of conduct that would successfully handle the implementation of shared values. The attempt to place such a regular pattern required creativity in the adoption of kibbutz practices to its growth and changing kibbutz system and encompassing society, but kibbutz leadership suppressed innovators and critical thinkers, causing either failures to deal with changes or adoption of capitalist solutions that negated kibbutz basic principles.
- The kibbutzim had rural patterns of settlements, while over the years the Israeli society began adopting urban patterns of settlements. The lack of match between the patterns of the kibbutz society and the majority of the Israeli society, appealed the strong linkage between the kibbutzim with the entire Israeli society, a principle that did not allow the continuation of the collaborative model (because of the internal weakening and the loss of the all-Israeli legitimacy).
- The kibbutzim were established during the pioneer period and were the fulfilment of the Zionist vision, as during that period of time every member was required to give the maximum from himself for the good of the collective: the kibbutz and the state. In addition, as a group it was easier to deal with the common problems of the individuals—which allowed the recruitment of a large number of people for maintaining the safety of the community at that time, and therefore this way of life was suited for the Zionist goals more than other forms of life at that time.
- The original concept of the kibbutzim was based to a large extent on self-sacrifice of its members for the sake of abstract foundations and not on the cancellation of work, and therefore after the pioneer period the linkage between the kibbutz members decreased, due to the decline in the pioneering spirit and the decline in the importance of the self-sacrifice values.
- When the kibbutz was perceived as an initiator for values and national objectives, it was very much appreciated in the Israeli society and it was easier for the members to identify themselves with the kibbutz, its function and its significance. With the decrease of its appreciation and the minimizing of the social significances in the Israeli society, the kibbutz identity weakened.
- The globalization processes and the kibbutz failure to block them exposed the kibbutz society to a different type of culture. For example, after kibbutz members were allowed to have television sets in their own homes, the kibbutz members were exposed to "the good life" in which people were compensated for their work and could buy themselves different luxurious items. The kibbutzim were not capable of dealing with these processes.
- The collapse of the Communist bloc resulted in the weakening of Socialist beliefs around the world, including in the kibbutz society.

During the 1980s, following the peak of the kibbutzim crisis, many people started leaving their kibbutzim, and there was considerable tension due to the economic situation. In order to cope with the situation, some kibbutzim began to change in various ways.

The changes that occurred could be divided into three main types:

- Extensive privatization of the kibbutz services—in fact, such privatization had been introduced over the past two decades in many kibbutzim. Most of these privatization processes, however, were made in matters that were considered relatively minor. Currently, many kibbutzim that have privatized (some of them with subsidies) have also privatized the education and health systems, which were once considered untouchable.
- "Differential wage"—one famous characteristic of the kibbutzim was that each kibbutz member received an equal budget according to his or her needs, regardless of what job they held. In many kibbutzim, members are now paid differentially based on the work they do.
- "Association of properties"—refers to the transfer of some of the properties belonging to the kibbutz, in its capacity as a cooperative commonality, to the ownership of individual kibbutz members. This is actually true privatization (unlike the services privatization). These assets include the homes where the members live and a sort of a "stock" in the manufacturing component of the kibbutz. This change allows kibbutz members to sell and bequeath both types of properties, within certain limitations.

Since the mid-1990s, the number of kibbutzim making significant changes in their lifestyle has continued to grow, while the resistance to these changes has gradually decreased, with only a few dozen kibbutzim still functioning under more traditional models. However, each kibbutz has undergone different processes of change. There are many people, outside and inside the kibbutzim, who claim these changes bring the end of the kibbutz concept. Among the communities that have recently officially ceased being kibbutzim are Megiddo in the Jezreel Valley, HagGoshrim in the Upper Galilee, Beyt Nir in the Negev, etc.

These processes have created the "renewing kibbutz" (הקיבוץ המתחדש)—a kibbutz settlement pattern not fully based on the original values of the kibbutz. Kibbutzim continuing under the original kibbutz values are associated with the "collaborative model" (הזרם השיתופי).

New compensation models

There are now three kibbutz compensation models. 1) The traditional collective kibbutz/kibbutz shitufi, in which members are compensated equally, regardless of what work each member does; 2) the mixed model kibbutz/kibbutz meshulav, in which each member is given a small percentage of his or their salary along with a basic component given equally to all kibbutz members; and 3) the renewing kibbutz/kibbutz mithadesh, in which a member's income consists solely of their individual income from his work and sometimes includes income from other kibbutz sources.

According to a survey conducted by the University of Haifa 188 of all kibbutzim (72%) are now converted to the "renewing kibbutz" model, which could be described as more individualistic kibbutz. Dr. Shlomo Getz, head of the Institute for the Research of the Kibbutz and the Cooperative Idea believes that by the end of 2012, there will be more kibbutzim switching to some alternative model.

== Ideology ==
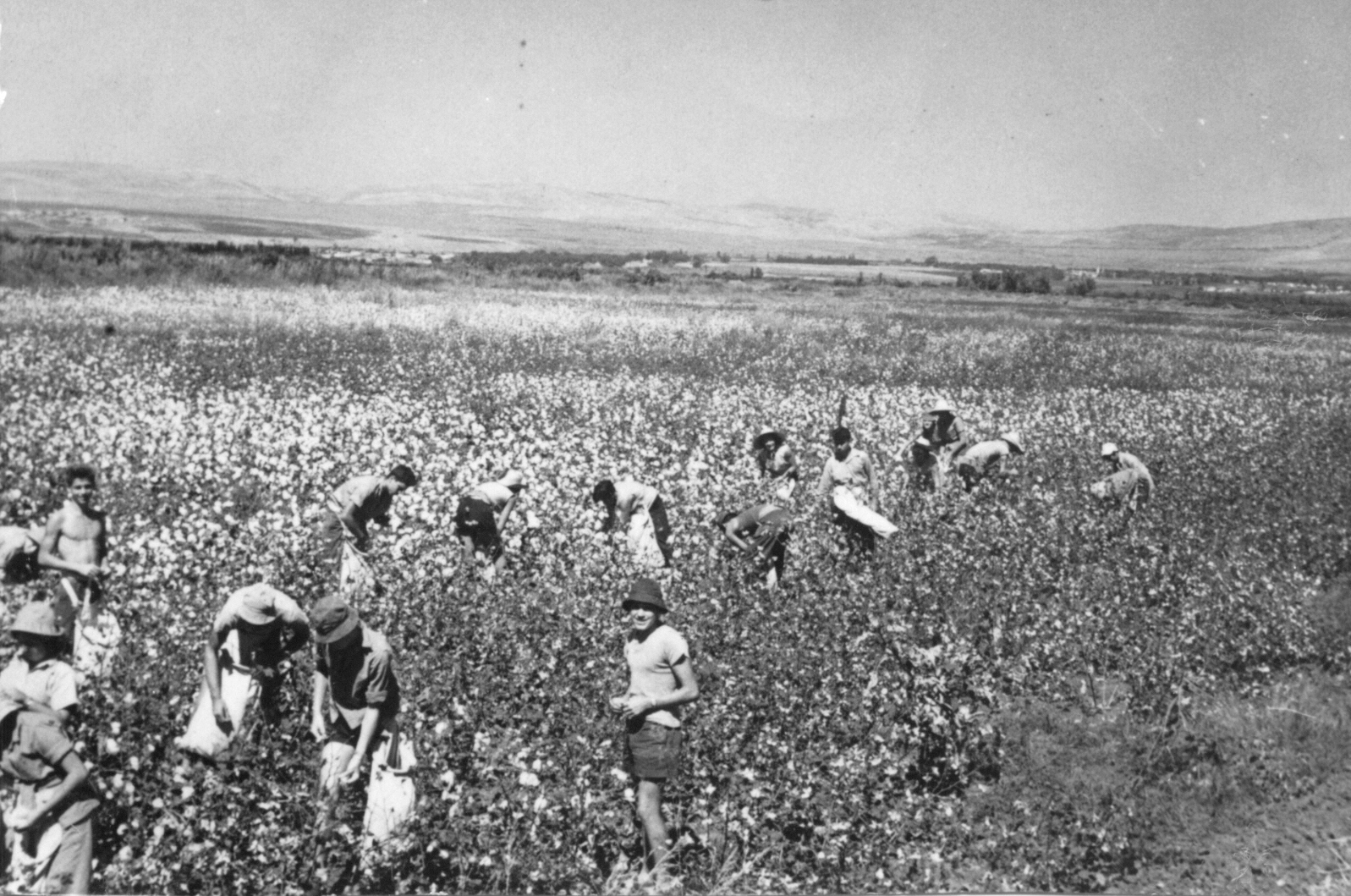
Cotton fields of kibbutz Shamir, ca. 1958

First Aliyah immigrants were largely religious, but those of the Second Aliyah were mainly secular. A Jewish work ethic thus replaced religious practice. Berl Katznelson, a Labor Zionist leader articulated this when he said "Everywhere the Jewish labourer goes, the divine presence goes with him."

The first kibbutzim were founded in the upper Jordan Valley, the Jezreel Valley and the Sharon coastal plain. The land was available for purchase because it was marshy and malaria-infested. The Zionists believed that the Arab population would be grateful for the economic benefits that developing the land would bring. Their approach was that the enemies of the Arab peasants were the Arab landowners (called effendis), not fellow Jewish farmers.

Kibbutz members were not classic Marxists though their system partially resembled Communism. Karl Marx and Friedrich Engels both shared a disdain for conventional formulations of the nation state and Leninists were hostile to Zionism. Nevertheless, in the late 1930s, two kibbutz leaders, Tabenkin and Yaari, initially attracted to anarchist ideas, pushed their movements to reverence of Joseph Stalin's dictatorship and of Stalin whom many called Shemesh HaAmim ("The Sun of the Nations").

The USSR voted at the UN for establishment of Israel. Stalin became hostile to Israel after it became apparent that Israel would not turn communist, so the USSR began serving diplomatic and military interests of various nations in the Arab world. This caused major crises and mass exit in both Kibbutz Meuchad and Kibbutz Artzi kibbutzim, especially after the 1952 Rudolf Slánský Prague show trials in which most of the accused and executed party functionaries were Jews and the 1953 Doctors' plot in Moscow of mostly Jews. Nonetheless many kibbutzim cancelled Purim celebrations when Stalin collapsed on 1 March 1953. Despite Communist atrocities and increasing state antisemitism in the USSR and its satellites many in the far left kibbutz movement, like Hashomer Hatzair (The Young Guard) viewed Stalin with awe and leader of the "peace camp". The party paper Al HaMishmar (On the Watch) presented this view. Kibbutzim were run as collective enterprises within Israel's partly free market system. Internally kibbutzim also practiced active democracy, with elections held for kibbutz functions and full participation in national elections in which the members generally voted along the lines of the kibbutz movement ideology. Jewish religious practices were banned or discouraged in many far left kibbutzim.

Kibbutzim were not the only contemporary communal enterprises: pre-war Palestine also saw the development of communal villages called moshavim. In a moshav, marketing and major farm purchases were collective, but other aspects of life were private.

In 2009, most votes from kibbutzim went to Kadima, Labor, and Meretz.

== Communal life ==
The principle of equality was taken extremely seriously up until the 1970s. Kibbutzniks did not individually own tools, or even clothing. Gifts and income received from outside were turned over to the common treasury. If a member received a gift in services—like a visit to a relative or a trip abroad paid for by a parent—there could be arguments at members' meetings about the propriety of accepting such a gift. Up until recently, members ate meals together in the communal dining hall. This was seen as an important aspect of communal life.

=== Children ===
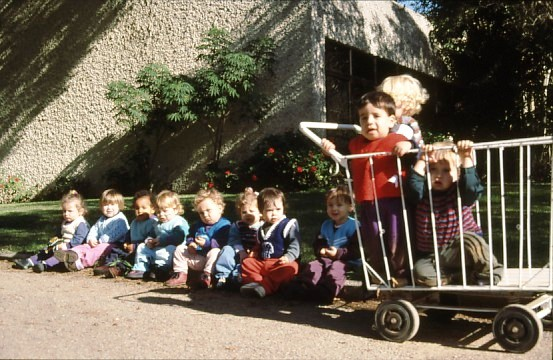
Children of Kibbutz Gan Shmuel, 1998

When the first children were born at the kibbutz there were inevitably some ethical dilemmas that needed to be solved. One of these was that the kibbutz was striving for equality, including the equality of the sexes. Women were only seen as separate because they gave birth to children, automatically tying them to the domestic sphere. In order to liberate women and promote gender equality, they could not be tied to solely domestic duties and child care giving. The Kibbutz wanted to give women the opportunity to continue their work in the agricultural sector and industrial sector. As such, Chayuta Bussel states: "Communal education is the first step towards woman's liberation."

Along with gender equality, the issue of parenting under the communal way of life was a concern. The parental tendency is to view the child as a personal possession and to dominate them. The founding members of the kibbutz agreed that this was not conducive to community life. They also thought it was selfish of parents to want to control their children and that this did not give room for the child to grow as their own person.

To solve these issues the founders created the communal children's houses, where the children would spend most of their time; learning, playing and sleeping. Parents spent three to four hours a day in the afternoon with their children after work and before dinner.

Collective childrearing was also a way to escape the patriarchal society that the founders came from. Children would not be dependent on their fathers economically, socially, legally or otherwise and this would eliminate the father's authority and uproot the patriarchy.

In the children's houses, trained nurses and teachers were the care givers. It was felt that relationships of the children and their parents would be better because parents would not have to be the sole disciplinarians. Children grew up in the community environment and grew up with children who were born in the same year as them. The financial responsibility of the children was shared by the community.

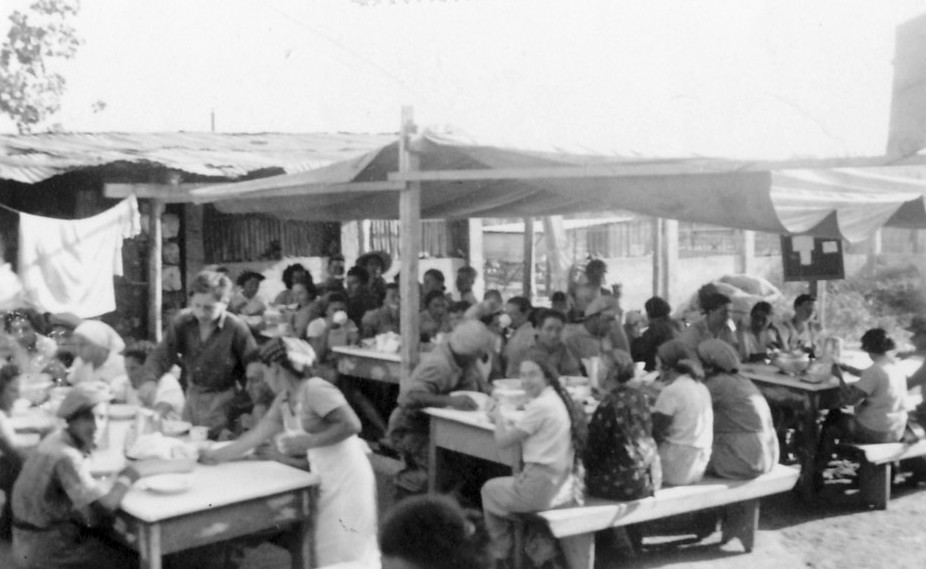
Dining room at Gan Shmuel, 1953

The founders of the Kibbutz sought a dynamic education for their children, that can be summed up in this statement from the founders of Kibbutz Degania:

From formal education to knowledge acquired from life, From the book to the physical work. From a discipline based on blind obedience to a regime of activity and creation in an atmosphere of freedom.

The adults in the community did their best to make the children's house into a children's home. They fully furnished them to accommodate every age group. "It is surrounded by a courtyard, well equipped for the growing child's needs, with flowers and bushes, hiding places, and playgrounds."

Under Freud's influence, the importance of the early years of childhood development were understood by the Kibbutz and much emphasis was put on fostering the child's sense of individuality, creativity, and basic trust. In practice transmission of family traditions and views was replaced by indoctrination into kibbutz and kibbutz movement views and also resulted in much uniformity vs. individuality. Significantly, this method of child rearing was not only "collectivization" of children, but a near complete conscious break with a cornerstone of Jewish life: focus on family, especially the nuclear family.

For many of the original founders of Kibbutz Degania, though, the arrival of children was a sobering experience. Tom Segev quotes one member: "When we saw our first children in the playpen, hitting one another, or grabbing toys just for themselves, we were overcome with anxiety. What did it mean that even an education in communal life couldn't uproot these egotistical tendencies? The utopia of our initial social conception was slowly, slowly destroyed."

==== Child rearing ====
From the 1920s until the 1970s, most kibbutzim had a system whereby the children would sleep in communal children's homes, called 'Beit Yeladim' (בית ילדים), instead of in their parents' apartments.

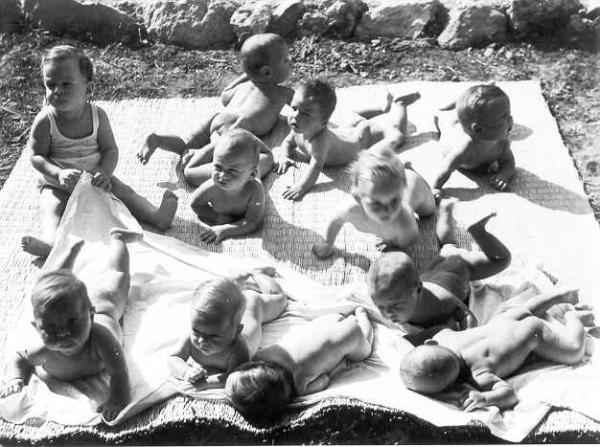
Kibbutz babies

Although the children were not raised directly by their parents, they knew who their parents were and formed close bonds with them. Throughout the morning, parents looked forward to the end of the work day when they could go to the children's house and pick up the children to play with them and dote on them.

Children's societies were one of the features of kibbutz life that most interested outsiders. In the heyday of children's societies, parents would only spend two hours a day, typically in the afternoon, with their children. In Kibbutz Artzi parents were explicitly forbidden to put their children to bed at night. As children got older, parents could go for days on end without seeing their offspring, other than through chance encounters somewhere in the grounds.

Some children who went through children's societies said they loved the experience, others remain ambivalent. One vocal group maintains that growing up without one's parents was very difficult. Years later, a kibbutz member described her childhood in a children's society:

Allowed to suckle every four hours, left to cry and develop our lungs, we grew up without the basic security needed for survival. Sitting on the potty at regular intervals next to other children doing the same, we were educated to be the same; but we were, for all that, different.... At night the grownups leave and turn off all the lights. You know you will wet the bed because it is too frightening to go to the lavatory.

Examples of children raised under the Kibbutz system of equality are given by Yosef Criden. When an aunt from a nearby city comes to visit her niece or nephew and brings a box of chocolate as a present for them, the child will excitedly open it up and eat a few of the chocolates. Then the child will go over to the rest of the group and give the rest of the chocolates to their peers. This is the ideology instilled in the children, to value the self but also to always think about others. Another example Yosef gives is that when his son, who was born and raised on a kibbutz, went into the army, he and his fellow bunk mates asked their supervising officer for a box. They wanted to keep the box in the middle of the room and whenever they would get care packages, they would put the items into the box and share them communally. They did not want to be like most of the units of officers from towns and cities, where each officer would hide their packages under their beds.

In a 1977 study, Fox compared the separation effects experienced by kibbutz children when removed from their mother, compared with removal from their caregiver (called a metapelet in Hebrew). He found that the child showed separation distress in both situations but, when reunited, children were significantly more attached to their mothers than to the metapelet. The children protested subsequent separation from their mothers when the metapelet was reintroduced to them. However, kibbutzim children shared high bonding with their parents as compared to those who were sent to boarding schools, because children in a kibbutz spent three to four hours with their parents every day.

In another study by Scharf, the group brought up in a communal environment within a kibbutz showed less ability in coping with imagined situations of separation than those who were brought up with their families. This has far reaching implications for child attachment adaptability and therefore institutions like kibbutzim. These interesting kibbutz techniques are controversial with or without these studies.

A mixture of criticism and nostalgia by some 20 adults born in Kibbutzim in the 1930s was documented in the 2007 film Children of the Sun. The film raised much controversy and brought about a flood of reactions in favor and against the practices of child raising in Kibbutzim in those early years of the Kibbutz. Interviews were interlaced with original footage.

The organisation of child rearing within the kibbutzim was largely based around adult imperatives rather than what was best for the children; collective parenting was seen as a means of establishing gender equality between men and women. This was a common feature of many utopian communities.

=== Higher education and intellectuality ===
On the ongoing continuity with their previously often more intellectual livelihoods, Spiro notes that it was commonly claimed to be:

artificial and parasitic; but [then] physical labor, detached from intellectual and artistic values, is boorish and stultifying. What was needed was a synthesis of the two, and thus arose the notion of the "synthetic personality", as it is termed by The Movement, the person who combines in a harmonious whole an attachment to the soil; a joy in work; and an appreciation for, if not creativity in, art, science, and literature. It is not a "landed gentry", but a "landed intelligentsia", that represents the kibbutz's self-image. Thus it is that, although the formal education of the average chaver rarely included college training and many of them did not complete high school, the intellectual level of Kiryat Yedidim is probably higher than that of the average urban community, and is incomparably higher than that of the average rural community. The casual conversation overheard in the fields includes literature, politics, science, international problems, and other intellectual topics.

At the same time, he also critiques:

Although the intellectualism of many of the chaverim is readily apparent, the auto-didactic nature of their learning is equally apparent. One is struck, in discussion with them, with the absence of the qualification, the reservation, the tentative attitude. This characteristic may stem, too, from yet another aspect of their intellectualism—its consumptive rather than productive nature. In all areas of "Culture", the chaverim are primarily consumers rather than producers. In like manner, they are training their children to appreciate, but not to create art, science, and scholarship. Indeed, the intellectual or artistic creator, to the extent that he permits his intellectual productivity to interfere with his economic productivity, is not highly regarded. Since they are not engaged in productive scholarship and, indeed, are not trained in the tools of scholarship, the kibbutz intellectuals lack that primary destroyer of the dogmatic attitude—research.

Accordingly, in the beginning, higher education was not valued as very important to the Kibbutz as most of the work was in agriculture. As the kibbutz changed and moved towards manufacturing and industry, more young people went to universities and colleges to pursue higher education. The total percentage of members studying at universities among kibbutz students rose from 38 percent in 1978 to 54 percent [in 1990]. Originally the Kibbutz paid college tuition in full, but in the 1980s with the kibbutz crisis, some began to pay a smaller share of tuition costs.

=== Gender equality ===
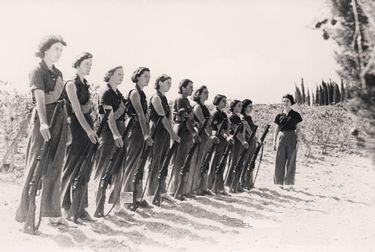
Kibbutznikiyot (female Kibbutz members), training at Mishmar HaEmek during the 1948 Palestine war

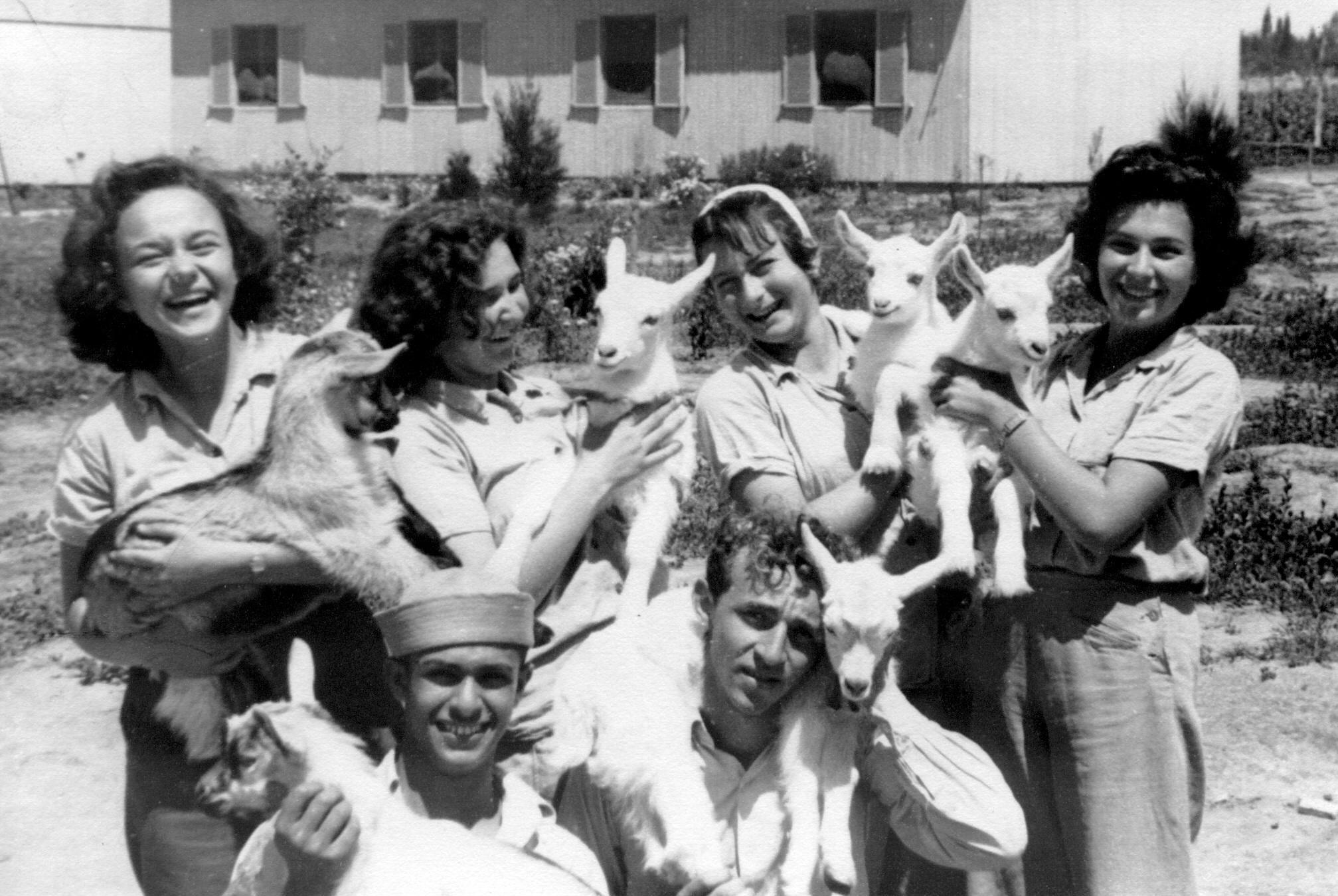
Kibbutz Gan Shmuel in 1953

The role of gender equality on the kibbutz is very complex and has gone through cycles since the founding of the first kibbutzim. Since there were many different kibbutzim, women had different experiences at each particular one. Some say that women were and are completely equal to men on the kibbutz while others insist there has always been inequality. In the early days of the movement, kibbutzim tended to be male-dominated with significantly more male members. Nevertheless, women performed many of the same tasks as men. Both men and women worked in the fields, performed guard duty, and heavy labor. However, mostly women filled the traditional female roles, such as cooking, sewing, and cleaning.

In the first couple of decades there was no traditional marriage in the kibbutz. If a man and woman wanted to get married, they went to the housing office and requested a room together. Not having traditional marriage was seen as a way to dissolve the patriarchy and give women their own standing without depending on a man (economically or socially) and was also viewed as a positive thing for the community as a whole, as communal life was the main aspect of the kibbutz.

When the first children were born at the kibbutz, the founders were worried that this would tie the women to domestic service. They thought that the only difference between a man and a woman was that women gave birth and thus were automatically tied to the children and domestic duties. The communal dining and laundry were already a part of the kibbutz from the start. Of course they were implemented for reasons of living communally, but also to emancipate women from these duties so they were free to work in other sectors. With the arrival of the children, it was decided that they would be raised communally and sleep communally to free women to work in other fields. The desire to liberate women from traditional maternal duties was an ideological underpinning of the children's society system. Women were "emancipated from the yoke of domestic service" in that their children were taken care of, and the laundry and cooking was done communally.

Women born on kibbutzim were much less reluctant to perform traditional female roles. Eventually most women gravitated towards the service sector. The second generation of women who were born on the kibbutz eventually got rid of the children's houses and the Societies of Children. Most found that although they had a positive experience growing up in the children's house, wanted their own children at home with them.

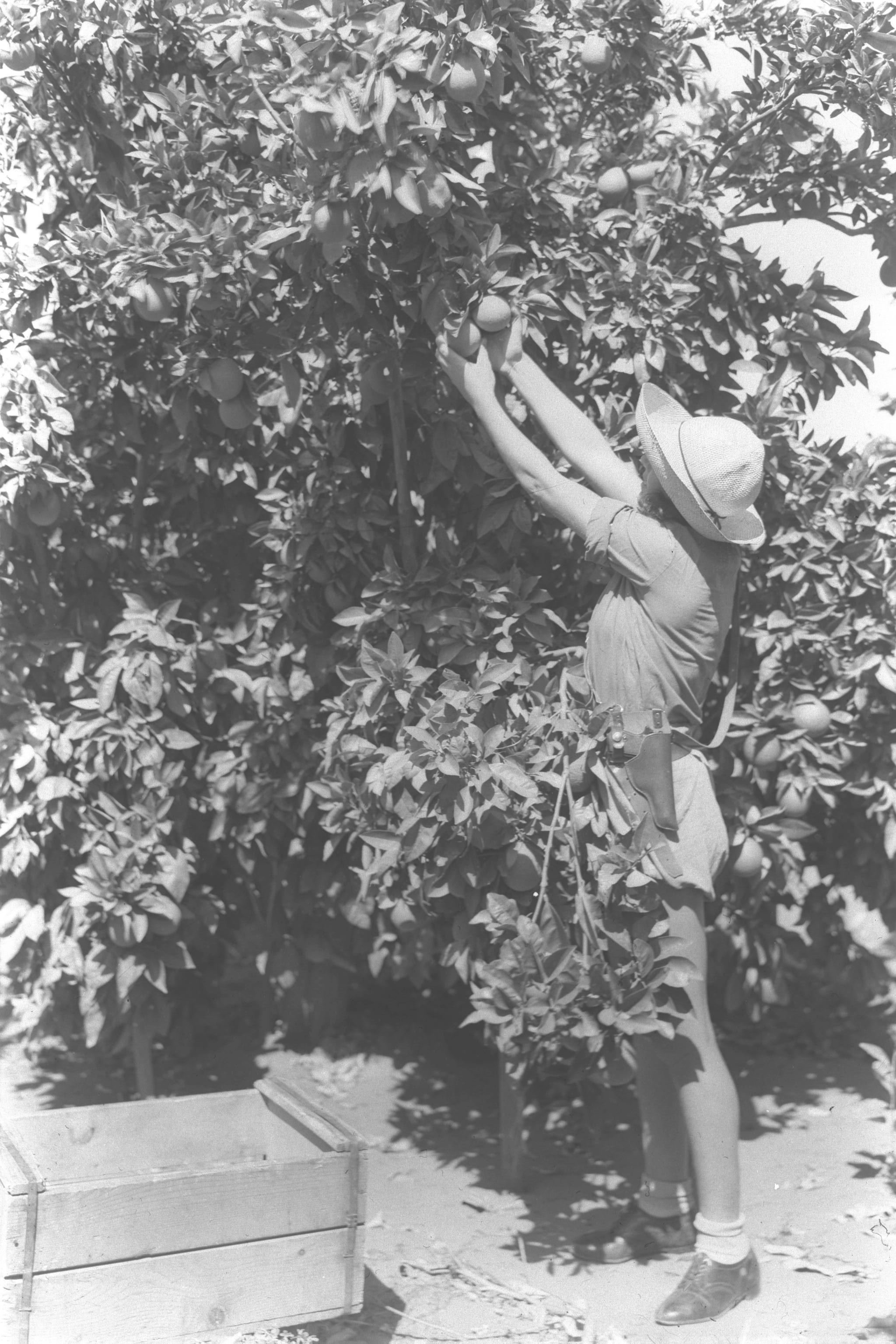
A woman working in the orange grove, Kibbutz Na'an

The documentary 'Full Circle' summarizes the change in the women's view of equality on the kibbutz. The original Utopian goal of the founders was complete gender equality. Children lived in the children's houses. Freed from domestic duties, women participated in the industrial, agricultural and economic sectors alongside men. However, in the 1960s, while the rest of the Western world demanded equality of the sexes and embraced feminism, the second generation of kibbutz born women began to return to more traditional gender roles. They rejected the ideal achieved by their grandparents and returned to domestic duties such as cooking, cleaning and taking care of children. Today, most women do not participate in the economic and industrial sectors of the kibbutz. They even embraced traditional marriage. Women often played a major part in this transition, often framing their arguments in terms of what they saw as the "natural needs" of womanhood and motherhood.

Another example of the change in the original egalitarian nature of the kibbutz is that the founders of the kibbutz did not use the traditional Hebrew word for husband, ba'al (בעל, BAH-al), because the word is otherwise used to mean "master" or "owner" and implies that the wife is submissive to her dominant spouse.

Statistical data proves that the majority of women work in the service and domestic sectors while men work in the production sector. According to data from the 1940s, gender equality existed neither in the domain of work nor in the area of politics in the kibbutzim of the time. For instance, in 1948, in eight kibbutzim of the Ihud, a kibbutz federation with a pragmatic socialist orientation, 78.3 percent of the women worked in services (services for adults, child care, education) as compared with 16.7 percent of the men. That same year, 15.2 percent of the women worked in production as distinct from 58.2 percent of the men. The situation was the same in political life.

By 1979, only 9 percent of the women were engaged in some type of farming activity. "[In 1979] only 12 percent of the female labor force is permanently assigned to productive branches, compared to 50 percent in 1920." Females comprise 84 percent of the service workers and the educational workers.

Also, although there was a "masculinization of women" at one point, there was no corresponding "feminization" of men. Women may have worked the fields, but men did not work in childcare.

The sociologist Arnold W. Green argues that all this may be an illustrative example of a more general tendency:

The phenomenon is worldwide: women are concentrated in fields which require, singly or in combination, housewifely skills, patience and routine, manual dexterity, sex appeal, contact with children. The generalization holds for the Israeli kibbutz, with its established ideal of sexual equality. A "regression" to a separation of "women's work" from "men's work" occurred in the division of labor, to a state of affairs which parallels that elsewhere. The kibbutz is dominated by males and traditional male attitudes, on balance to the content of both sexes.

=== Social life ===
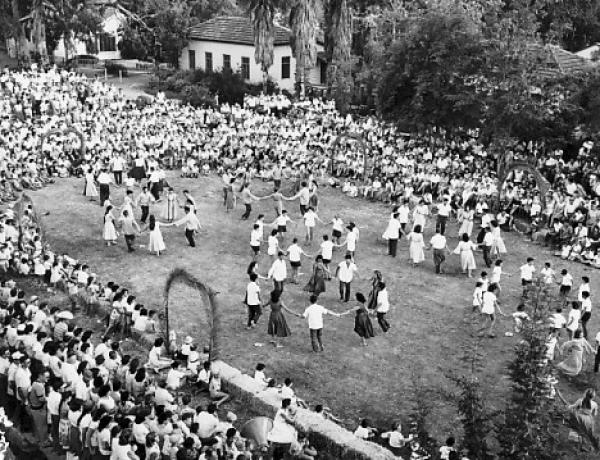
Kibbutz Gan Shmuel on Shavuot, 1959

==== The dining hall as social centre ====
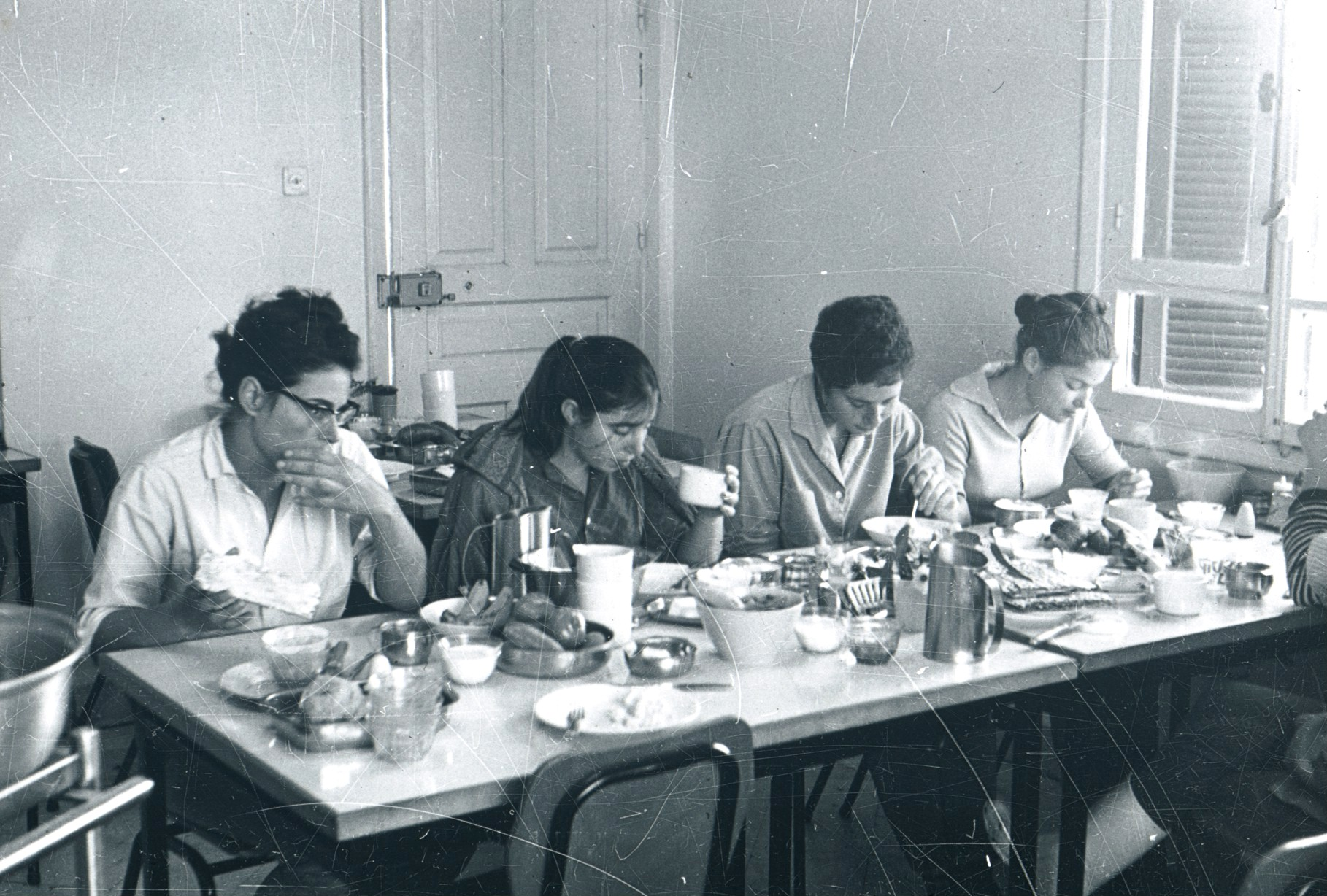
Dining hall in Kibbutz Merom Golan, ca. 1968–1972

Along with property and ideology, social lives were also held in common. As an example, most kibbutz dining halls exclusively utilized benches, not as an issue of cost or convenience, but because benches were construed as another way of expressing communal values. In the beginning, some kibbutzim husbands and wives were discouraged from sitting together, as marriage was an expressed form of exclusivity. In The Kibbutz Community and Nation Building, Paula Rayman reports that Kibbutz Har refused to buy tea kettles for its members in the 1950s; the issue being not the cost, but that couples owning tea kettles would mean more time spent together in their apartments, rather than with the community in the dining hall.

==== Private property ====
In the beginning, members were not allowed individual items, like tea kettles and everything was strictly communal. Starting around the 1950s and 1960s, people were entitled to individual property, like teakettles, books, radios etc. According to Criden and Gelb "The equality problem only becomes serious when there are gross deviations from basic principles". Having a few books was fine, but having a private car was unacceptable. Items like cars were communally owned and had to be requested in advance by members or used for work related duties.

Communal life proved hard for some. Every kibbutz saw some new members quit after a few years. Since kibbutzniks had no individual bank accounts, any purchase not made at the kibbutz canteen had to be approved by a committee, a potentially humiliating and time-wasting experience.

==== Free-loaders; lack of privacy ====
Kibbutzim also had their share of members who were not hard workers, or who abused common property; there would always be resentment against these "parasites". Although according to Criden and Gelb, the vast majority of people on kibbutzim are not free-loaders. They state that their chief weapon against free-loaders is public opinion. People who do not pull their own weight in the community are frowned upon and their opinions are not taken seriously by the community and they are not given any responsibility.

Finally, kibbutzim, as small, isolated communities, tended to be places of gossip, exacerbated by lack of privacy and the regimented work and leisure schedules.

==== Decision-making ====
Although major decisions about the future of the kibbutz were made by consensus or by voting, day-to-day decisions about where people would work were made by elected leaders. Typically, kibbutzniks would learn their assignments by consulting the duty sheet at the dining hall.

Kibbutz memoirs from the Pioneer era report that kibbutz meetings varied from heated arguments to free-flowing philosophical discussions, whereas memoirs and accounts from kibbutz observers from the 1950s and 1960s report that kibbutz meetings were businesslike but poorly attended.

==== Job rotation ====
Kibbutzim attempted to rotate people into different jobs. One week a person might work in planting, the next with livestock, the week after in the kibbutz factory and the following week in the laundry. Even managers would have to work in menial jobs. Through rotation, people took part in every kind of work, but it interfered with any process of specialization.

==== Sex and marriage ====
Aversion to sex was not part of the kibbutz ideology; to this end, teenagers were not segregated at night in children's societies, yet many visitors to kibbutzim were astonished at how conservative the communities tended to be. In Children of the Dream, Bruno Bettelheim quoted a kibbutz friend, "at a time when the American girls preen themselves, and try to show off as much as possible sexually, our girls cover themselves up and refuse to wear clothing that might show their breasts or in any other fashion be revealing." Kibbutz divorce rates were and are extremely low. Unfortunately from the point of view of the adults in the community, marriage rates among communally raised children were equally low. This conservatism on the part of kibbutz children has been attributed to the Westermarck effect—a form of reverse sexual imprinting whereby even unrelated children, if raised together from an early age, tend to reject each other as potential partners. The children who grew up together in the children's houses considered their peers brothers and sisters and had close lasting bonds with each other.

==== Culture and arts ====
From the beginning, kibbutzim had a reputation as culture-friendly and nurturing of the arts. Many kibbutzniks became writers, actors, or artists. Kibbutzim typically offer theatre companies, choirs, orchestras, athletic leagues, and special-interest classes. In 1953 Givat Brenner staged the play My Glorious Brothers, about the Maccabee revolt, building a real village on a hilltop as a set, planting real trees, and performing for 40,000 people. Following kibbutz work practices of the time, all the actors were members of the kibbutz, and all performed as part of their work assignments.

=== Crime ===
Although there have been sensational crimes on kibbutzim, overall the crime rate is lower than the national average by a significant margin.

== Psychological aspects ==
=== Emotional involvement ===
Three researchers who wrote about psychological life on kibbutzim were Melford E. Spiro (1958), Bruno Bettelheim (1969) and Michael Baizerman (1963). All concluded that a kibbutz upbringing led to individuals' having greater difficulty in making strong emotional commitments thereafter, such as falling in love or forming a lasting friendship. On the other hand, they appear to find it easier to have a large number of less-involved friendships, and a more active social life.

Some researchers came to the conclusion that children growing up in these tightly knit communities tended to see the other children around them as ersatz siblings and preferred to seek mates outside the community when they reached maturity. Some theorize that living amongst one another on a daily basis virtually from birth on produced an extreme version of the Westermarck effect, which diminished teenage kibbutzniks' sexual attraction to one another. Partly as a result of not finding a mate from within the kibbutz, youth often abandon kibbutz life as adults.

=== Private property ===
The era of independent Israel kibbutzim attracted interest from sociologists and psychologists who attempted to study the effects of life without private property and the effects of life being brought up apart from one's parents.

Bettelheim suggested that the lack of private property was the cause of the lack of emotions in kibbutzniks. He wrote, "nowhere more than in the kibbutz did I realize the degree to which private property, in the deep layers of the mind, relates to private emotions. If one is absent, the other tends to be absent as well". (See primitivism and primitive communism for a general discussion of these concepts).

=== Group pressure to conform ===
In Kibbutz life, group pressure to conform is particularly strong. It is a subject of debate within the kibbutz movement as to how successful kibbutz education was in developing the talents of gifted children. Several kibbutz-raised children look back and say that the communal system stifled ambition; others say that bright children were nonetheless encouraged. Bruno Bettelheim, in his Children of the Dream (1969), had predicted that kibbutz education would yield mediocrity: "[kibbutz children] will not be leaders or philosophers, will not achieve anything in science or art." However, in the 1990s, a journalist tracked down the specific class of children Bettelheim had interviewed back in the 1960s at "Kibbutz Atid" (now called Kibbutz Ramat Yohanan). The journalist found that the children were highly accomplished in academia, business, music, and the military. "Bettelheim got it totally wrong."

== Economics ==
Population of the kibbutzim

Kibbutzim in the early days tried to be self-sufficient in all agricultural goods, from eggs to dairy to fruits to meats, but realized this was not possible. Land was generally provided by the Jewish National Fund. Later, they became dependent on government subsidies.

Even before the establishment of the State of Israel, kibbutzim began to branch out from agriculture into manufacturing. Kibbutz Degania Alef opened a factory for diamond cutting tools that came to have a gross turnover of several US million dollars a year. Kibbutz Hatzerim has a factory for drip irrigation equipment. Netafim is a multinational corporation that grosses over US$300 million a year. Maagan Michael branched out from making bullets to making plastics and medical tools, and running an ulpan. These enterprises bring in over US$100 million a year. A great wave of kibbutz industrialization came in the 1960s, and as of 2012 only 15% of kibbutz members worked in agriculture.

Hiring seasonal workers was always a point of controversy in the kibbutz movement. During harvest time, when hands were needed, labourers were sought outside the kibbutz. The founders of the kibbutz movement wanted to redeem the Jewish nation through manual labour, and hiring non-Jews to do hard tasks was not consistent with that idea. In the 1910s Kibbutz Degania vainly searched for Jewish masons to build their homes, but could not find Jewish stonemasons, and hired Arabs.

In the 1970s kibbutzim frequently hired Arab labourers. From the 1990s, teams of foreign workers were brought in, many from Thailand and China.

Kibbutzim have branched out into tourism, among them Kiryat Anavim, Lavi and Nahsholim. Many kibbutzim rent out homes or run guesthouses. Several kibbutzim, such as Kibbutz Lotan and Kfar Ruppin, operate bird-watching vacations and eco tours. These tours showcase their development of sustainable technologies such as mud huts and compostable toilets.

In 2010, there were 270 kibbutzim in Israel with population of 126,000.

Today, some Kibbutzim operate major industrial ventures. Their factories and farms account for 9% of Israel's industrial output, worth US$8 billion, and 40% of its agricultural output, worth over US$1.7 billion. For example, in 2010, Kibbutz Sasa, containing some 200 members, generated US$850 million in annual revenue from its military-plastics industry. Kibbutz Ketura is leading Israel's development of solar technology, becoming a popular eco tourism attraction.

== Types ==
There are three kibbutz movements:

1. The Kibbutz Movement, which constitutes an umbrella organization of two separate movements and ideologies: the United Kibbutz Movement, founded in 1979 as a merger of two older movements: the United Kibbutz and Union of Kvutzot and Kibbutzim, and Kibbutz Artzi Hashomer Hatzair
2. Religious Kibbutz Movement Hapoel HaMizrachi
3. Poalei Agudat Yisrael

Many kibbutzim were initially established by Nahal groups affiliated with Israeli youth movements, among them HaNoar HaOved VeHaLomed, Hashomer Hatzair and HaMachanot HaOlim.

Following many changes the kibbutzim went through during the years and following the appeal made to Israeli High Court of Justice by the Mizrahi Democratic Rainbow Coalition in 2001 in which the state was required to redefine the exact definition of a kibbutz in order to define the rightful benefits the kibbutzim members should be granted by law. The reactivated legal definition was given to the Industry, Trade and Labour Minister of Israel on 15 December 2005 (תקנות סיווג הקיבוצים). According to this classification there are three types of kibbutzim:

1. Kibbutz Shitufi (קיבוץ שיתופי): a kibbutz still preserving a cooperative system.
2. Kibbutz MitChadesh (קיבוץ מתחדש): a community with a number of cooperative systems in its intentions (guaranteed minimal income within the community, partnership in the ownership of the production means, partnership in the ownership of the lands, etc.).
3. Urban kibbutz (קיבוץ עירוני): a community existing within an existing settlement (city). Since the 1970s around 100 urban kibbutzim have been founded within existing Israeli cities. They have no enterprises of their own and all of their members work in the non-kibbutz sector. Examples include Tamuz in Beit Shemesh (near Jerusalem); Horesh in Kiryat Yovel, Jerusalem; Beit Yisrael in Gilo, Jerusalem and Migvan in Sderot.

A mixed moshav-kibbutz type of settlement can be called a moshbutz.

== Legal reforms after privatisation ==
Some kibbutzim have been involved in legal actions related to their status as kibbutzim. Kibbutz Glil Yam, near Herzliya, petitioned the court regarding privatisation. In 1999, eight members of kibbutz Beit Oren applied to the High Court of Justice to order the registrar of cooperative societies to declassify Beit Oren as a kibbutz and reclassify it as a different kind of cooperative society. The petitioners argued that the Kibbutz had dramatically changed its life style, having implemented differential salaries, closing the communal dining hall, and privatising the educational system and other services. These changes did not fit the legal definition of a kibbutz, and in particular, the principle of equality in consumption. Consequently, the registrar of cooperative societies, who has the authority to register and classify cooperative societies, should change the classification of kibbutz Beit Oren. The kibbutz responded that it still maintained the basic principles of a kibbutz, but the changes made were vital to prevent a financial collapse and to improve the economic situation.

This case resulted in the Government establishing the "Ben-Rafael Committee" chaired by Tel Aviv University professor Eliezer Ben-Rafael to recommend a new legal definitions that will suit the development of the kibbutz, and to submit an opinion on the allocation of apartments to kibbutz members. The committee submitted a detailed report with two new legal classifications to the settlements known today as kibbutzim. The first classification was named 'communal kibbutz', identical to the traditional definition of a kibbutz. The second classification was called the 'renewing kibbutz' and included developments and changes in lifestyle, provided that the basic principles of mutual guarantee and equality are preserved. In light of the above, the committee recommended that instead of the current legal definition of kibbutz, two different determinations will be created, as follows.

- a) Communal kibbutz: a society for settlement, being a separate settlement, organised on the basis of collective ownership of possession, of self-employment, and of equality and cooperation in production, consumption and education.
- b) Renewing kibbutz: it should fulfill the same conditions quoted above for the 'communal kibbutz', with the additional condition that it maintains mutual guarantee among its members, and its articles of association includes some or all of the following:
  - relative wages according to the individual contribution or to seniority allocation of apartments
  - allocation of productive means to its members, excluding land, water
  - productive quotas, provided that the cooperative society will maintain control over the productive means and that the articles of association restrict the negotiability of allocated productive means.

The recommendations were accepted by Cabinet of Israel in 2004.

== Kibbutzim outside Israel ==
=== Kibbutz Buchenwald ===
Kibbutz Buchenwald was formed after the liberation of the Buchenwald concentration camp in the spring of 1945 as an exercise in resilience, self-management and agricultural training. A group of sixteen young male survivors organized the first Jewish agricultural collective of post-war Germany in the barracks of the former Nazi camp, which had been renamed to "Buchenwald displaced persons camp", to prepare the Jews for aliyah (emigration to the Land of Israel, at the time still ruled by the British). It operated for several years with a growing number of members. In 1948, after the creation of the State of Israel, the survivors founded their own community there.It was initially called "Kibbutz Buchenwald, " then "Netzer", and finally Netzer Sereni.

=== Kibbutzim in France ===
From 1933 to 1935, the village of Jugeals-Nazareth hosted Makhar, the only Jewish kibbutz in France. An agricultural building was rented by an emissary from Baron Robert de Rothschild to open a farm-school for young French Jews, before their departure for Palestine, conquered by the British in December 1917 with the arrival in Jerusalem in particular of General Edmund Allenby and which was then placed by decision of the League of Nations in 1920 as a mandatory territory of the United Kingdom of Great Britain and Northern Ireland. Jewish refugees join Makhar, mostly Germans, but also Poles, Lithuanians, Russians, Hungarians, Dutch or Czechs and even Americans. About 500 to 800 kibbutznikim thus cultivated 75 hectares (190 acres). The rise of anti-Semitism in France and the xenophobic actions of the sub-prefect Roger Dutruch, however, eventually forced the closure of Makhar. Most of the residents then left for Ayelet HaShahar.

From 1960 to 1963, a Jansenist Catholic kibbutz, inspired by the kibbutzim of Israel, was created by Vincent Thibout, a member of La Famille in Pardailhan. He then created a new Christian community, still based on the kibbutz model and self-determined as such, in Malrevers.

== Legacy ==
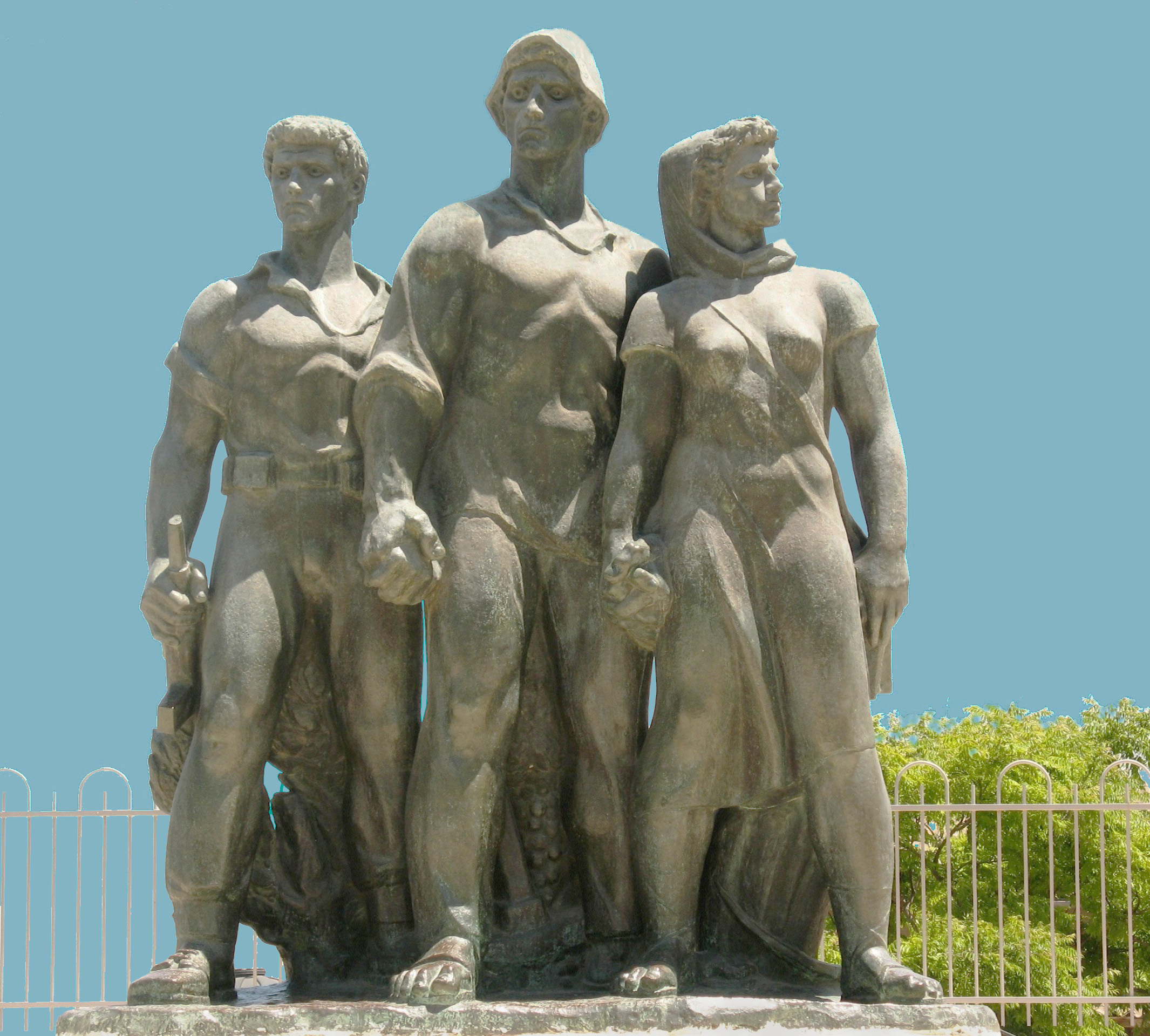
Monument at Kibbutz Negba (1953) by Natan Rapoport

In his history of Palestine under the British Mandate, One Palestine, Complete, "New Historian" Tom Segev wrote of the kibbutz movement:

The kibbutz was an original social creation, yet always a marginal phenomenon. By the end of the 1920s no more than 4,000 people, children included, lived on some thirty kibbutzim, and they amounted to a mere 2.5% of Palestine's Jewish population. The most important service the kibbutzim provided to the Jewish national struggle was military, not economic or social. They were guardians of Zionist land, and their patterns of settlement would to a great extent determine the country's borders. The kibbutzim also had a powerful effect on the Zionist self-image.

As against this characterization, numerous students found kibbutzim played a major role in agricultural innovation that advanced the Israeli agriculture to leading the world in some sectors, for instance irrigation. In later era many of their factories led Israeli efforts to gain economic independence by production for export, while their political involvement was of major importance up to 1948. The Kibbutz Meuchad and Kibbutz Artzi menaced Ben-Gurion's dominance of Yishuv politics in the 1940s, but they failed gaining wide public support in Israeli elections ever since 1949 because of reverence of Stalin's dictatorship, which most Israelis denounced. Kibbutzim have been criticized for falling short of living up to their own ideals. Most kibbutzim are not self-sufficient and have to employ non-kibbutz members as farm workers (or later factory workers). What was particularly controversial was the employment of Arab labourers while excluding them from the possibility of joining the Kibbutz as full members.

Some kibbutzim have been criticized for "abandoning" socialist principles and turning to capitalist projects in order to make the kibbutz more self-sufficient economically. Kibbutz Shamir owns an optical products company that is listed on the NASDAQ stock exchange. Numerous kibbutzim have moved away from farming and developed parts of their property for commercial and industrial purposes, building shopping malls and factories on kibbutz land that serve and employ non kibbutz members while the kibbutz retains a profit from land rentals or sales. Conversely, kibbutzim that have not engaged in this sort of development have also been criticized for becoming dependent on state subsidies to survive.

Nonetheless, kibbutzniks played a role in yishuv society and then Israeli society, far out of proportion to their population, and many kibbutzniks have served Israel in positions of leadership. The invention of the Tower and Stockade system by which 52 settlements from 1938 to 1947 largely decided the borders of Israel in the UN 29 November 1947 decision, is attributed to kibbutz member Shlomo Gur.

The establishment of the Palmach underground army in 1942, which won the yishuv crucial military struggle against Palestinian Arabs from 30 November 1947 up to 15 May 1948 that made possible the establishment of the Israeli state, was due to efforts by Tabenkin and other Kibbutz Meuchad leaders. One of them, Yigal Allon and Kibbutz Artzi member Shimon Avidan were the two most important commanders who won the 1948 war, and numerous kibbutz members were Cabinet ministers who largely shaped Israeli politics from 1955 to 1977. Kibbutz-born Ehud Barak was prime minister from 1999 to 2001, and David Ben-Gurion lived most of his life in Tel Aviv, but joined Kibbutz Sde Boker in the Negev after resigning as prime minister in 1953. He remained a member after his return to office in 1955.

Kibbutzim also contributed greatly to the growing Hebrew culture movement. The poet Rachel rhapsodized on the landscape from viewpoints from various Galilee kibbutzim in the 1920s and 1930s. The kibbutz dream of "making the desert bloom" became part of the Israeli dream as well.

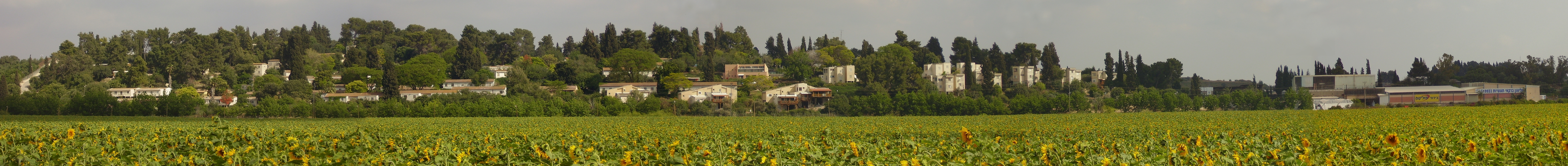
Panorama of Kibbutz Barkai in the Wadi Ara region

== See also ==
- Agriculture in Israel
- Agroecology
- Am Olam
- Development town
- HaNoar HaTzioni
- Israeli settlement
- Jewish land purchase in Palestine
- Jewish Agency for Israel
- Kibbutz volunteer
- List of films about the kibbutz
- List of kibbutzim
- Mir—traditional rural peasant village communities in Imperial Russia during the 19th and early 20th centuries
- Oneida stirpiculture
