= Urban kibbutz =

An urban kibbutz (Hebrew: קיבוץ עירוני, Kibbutz Ironi) is a form of kibbutz located within an existing city. There are currently just over 100 in Israel, totalling around 2,000 members.

Although there were attempts to form urban kibbutzim in the early 20th century, their success was limited and most failed. The idea was revived in the 1970s when a number of co-operative communities were established by former kibbutz members and Nahal graduates with the aim of retaining the kibbutz lifestyle whilst moving into mainstream society. They have since taken on an increasing role in the delivery of social services. For example, in Haifa the city council asked members of the HaNoar HaOved VeHaLomed youth movement to form an urban kibbutz in the Hadar neighbourhood to work with at-risk children. Some standard kibbutzim, such as Mesilot, began as urban kibbutzim.

== Definitions ==
The Israeli Registrar of Cooperative Societies classifies ‘kibbutz’ as a subcategory of ‘cooperative organisations’, and ‘urban kibbutz’ as a subcategory of ‘kibbutz’. Urban Kibbutz is defined in the Cooperative Societies Regulations (2007) as “[a] cooperative society that functions for social contribution to and participation in Israeli society, organised on principles of self-labour and of cooperation in income, consumption and education on the basis of its members’ equality.”

== List of urban kibbutzim ==
- Beit Yisrael in Gilo, Jerusalem
- Migvan in Sderot
- Reshit in Ir Ganim, Jerusalem
- Horesh in Kiryat Yovel, Jerusalem
- Shomrei HaShalom, a Black Hebrew kibbutz in Dimona
- Tamuz in Beit Shemesh
- Mish'ol in Nof HaGalil
