= Yitzhak Gruenbaum =

Zionist leader among the Polish Jewry (1879–1970)

- יצחק גרינבוים
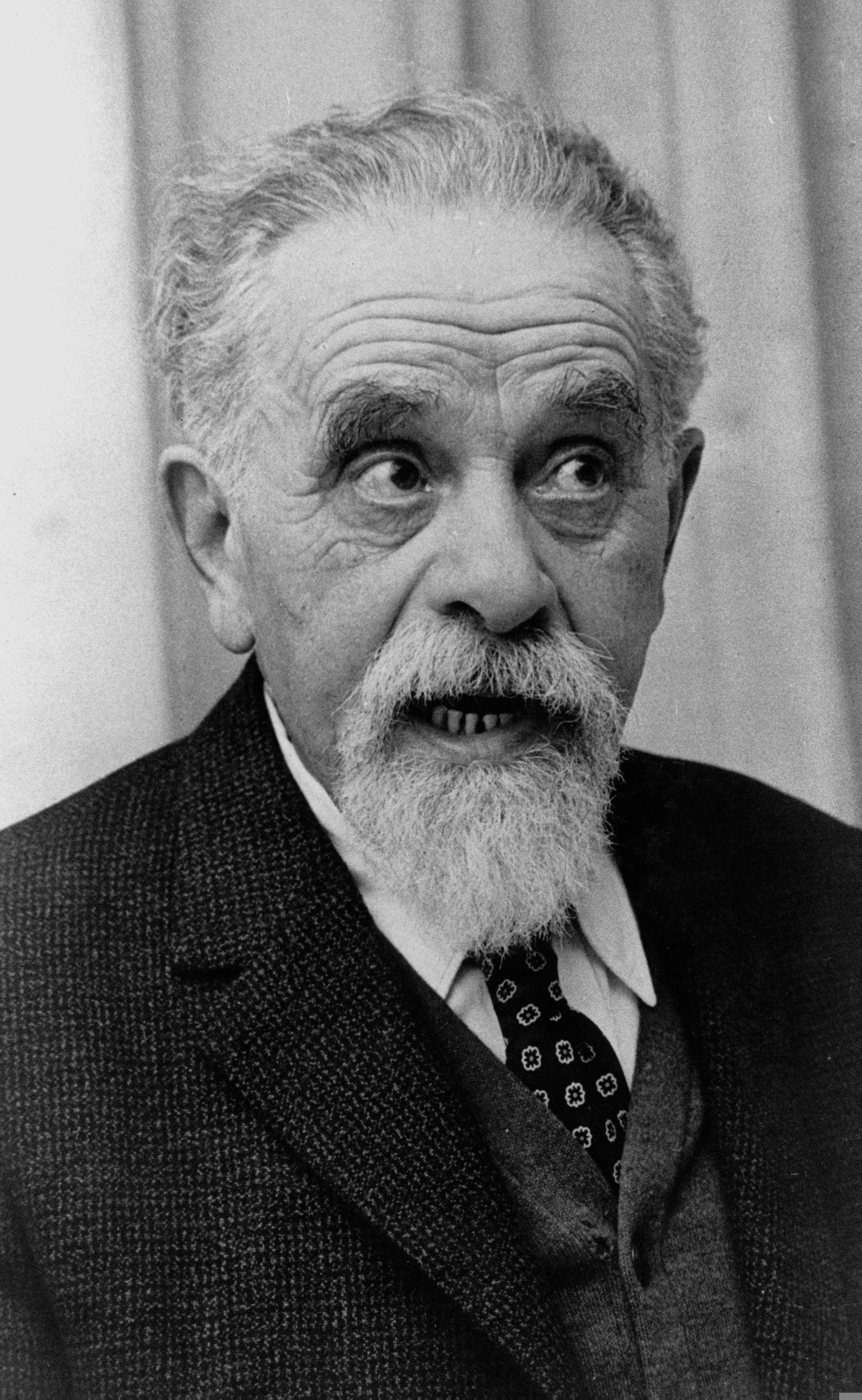

Ministerial roles
- 1948–1949: Minister of Internal Affairs

Personal details
- Born: 24 November 1879 Warsaw, Russian Empire
- Died: 7 September 1970 (aged 90) Gan Shmuel, Israel
- Party: Bloc of National Minorities

Yitzhak Gruenbaum (Polish: Izaak Grünbaum, Hebrew and Yiddish: יצחק גרינבוים; 1879–1970) was a Polish and later Israeli politician. He was a leader of the Bloc of National Minorities and one of the top Zionist leaders in interwar Poland. In 1933 he travelled to Mandatory Palestine and became active in Labor Zionist groups. He served as the first Minister of the Interior of Israel. In 1952 he was a candidate for President of Israel.

== Biography ==
Yitzhak ("Itche") Gruenbaum was born in Warsaw, Poland. While a student of jurisprudence, he began activities on behalf of the Zionist movement and engaged in journalism. He served as editor of several periodicals widely circulated among Polish Jewry, including the Hebrew Ha-Zefirah and the Hebrew weekly Ha-Olam. Under his editorship, the Yiddish daily, Haynt, took on a pro-Zionist slant.

In Poland, Gruenbaum headed the Radical Zionist faction, initially known in Poland as Al Hamishmar. In 1919 he was elected to the Sejm (Polish parliament), where, together with Apolinary Hartglas, he organized a "Jewish bloc" that united most of the Jewish parties. He was the moving force in forming a collaboration with other minority parties represented in the Sejm, including Germans, Ukrainians, and others, to form a Bloc of National Minorities alliance in 1922, that acted to represent the rights of minority populations in Poland. His efforts brought about an increase of Jewish representation in the Sejm, which was accompanied by a rise of the political Zionism. Gruenbaum was known for his courageous and militant stance against his opponents and on behalf of minorities' interests, while equally critical of the ultra-orthodox party Agudat Israel and Jewish lobbying.

After moving to Paris in 1932, Gruenbaum immigrated to Mandatory Palestine in 1933 after being elected to the Jewish Agency Executive (the board of directors), during the Eighteenth Congress of the Zionist Organization.

== Zionist activism ==
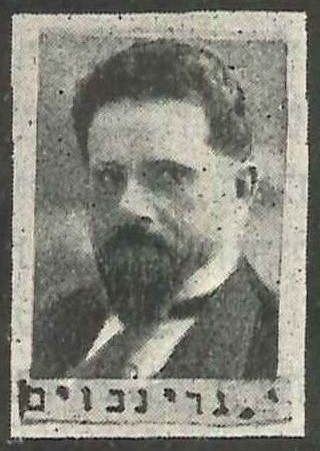
Yitzhak Gruenbaum, 1926

During the Holocaust, he served on the "Committee of Four" chosen at the outbreak of World War II to maintain contact with Polish Jewry and aid in their rescue. In 1942, when word reached the Yishuv of the mass extermination by the German occupying forces taking place in Eastern Europe, Gruenbaum was chosen to head a 12-member Rescue Committee comprising representatives of the various parties. Due to circumstances prevailing at the time, their rescue efforts failed to accomplish much.

At the war's end, he endured a personal crisis involving his son, Eliezer Gruenbaum. The latter, a Holocaust survivor, was accused in Paris by two other Holocaust survivors of having served as a Kapo and acting with cruelty towards Jewish prisoners. During his son's detention and trial, Gruenbaum remained at his side. When the case closed, Eliezer immigrated to Palestine but continued to be attacked by right-wing and religious groups eager to discredit his father. Not long afterwards, Eliezer was killed in the 1948 Arab-Israeli War.

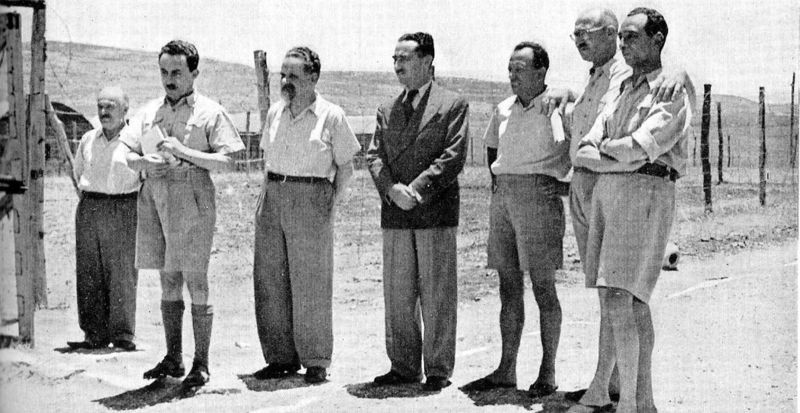
Zionist leaders, arrested in Operation Agatha, in detention in Latrun (l-r): David Remez, Moshe Sharett, Yitzhak Gruenbaum, Dov Yosef, Mr. Shenkarsky, David Hacohen, and Isser Harel (1946)

In 1946, Gruenbaum was among the Jewish Agency directors arrested by the British and interned in a detention camp at Latrun.

He spent his later years on Kibbutz Gan Shmuel, and died in 1970.

== Political career ==
Yitshak Gruenbaum List רשימת יצחק גרינבוים
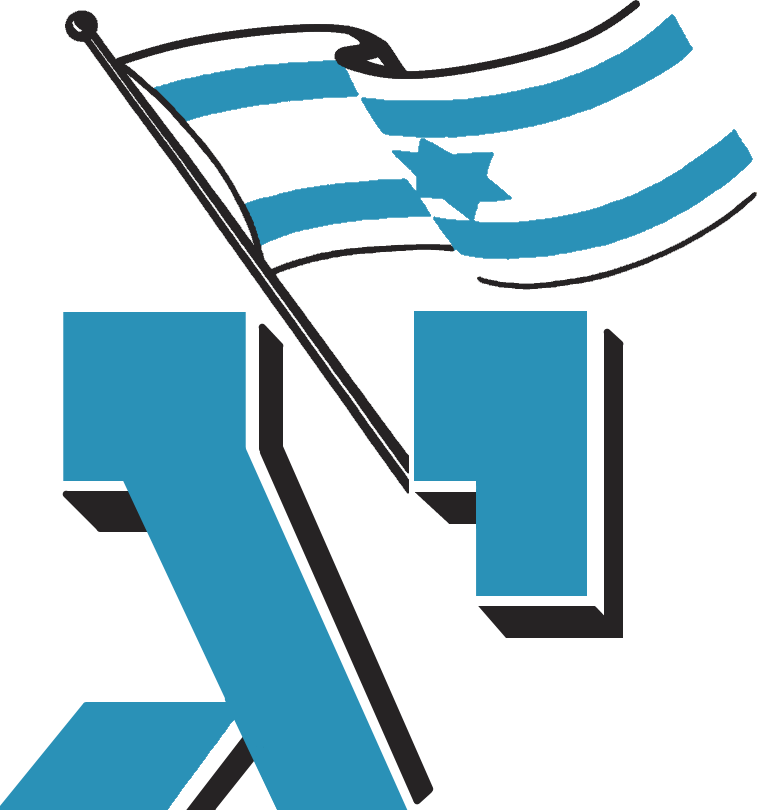
- Leader: Yitzhak Gruenbaum
- Founded: 1948
- Dissolved: 1949
- Ideology: Zionism
- Political position: Centre-left

Election symbol
- יג

Gruenbaum was among a group of 13 leaders forming the provisional government of the emerging State, and, as a member of Provisional State Council (Moetzet HaAm), signed its declaration of independence. Between 1948 and 1949 he served as a member of the Provisional State Council and was the first Minister of the Interior in that formative period. His initial stance was with the General Zionists, but as time went on moved leftward. He became an adherent of the Mapam socialist-Zionist party, and was known as a declared secularist. Gruenbaum headed an independent list in the elections for the first Knesset, but failed to obtain the minimum number of votes to secure a seat.

According to a February 26, 2026 Haaretz investigation, the protocols of relevant Israeli government meetings from 1948 have not been fully released even after nearly 80 years, though portions of ministerial exchanges have been opened in recent years following pressure on the State Archives. In a discussion concerning orders “to cleanse the area,” Minister Yitzhak Greenboim was quoted as saying that an outside observer could not explain the flight of the Arabs, and that it was reasonable to conclude they were driven to flee through looting, rape, murder, and expulsion, adding that the expulsions should be stopped.

He was later a candidate for President in the 1952 presidential election alongside Yitzhak Ben-Zvi of Mapai, Peretz Bernstein of the General Zionists and Mordechai Nurock of Mizrachi. However, he was beaten by Ben-Zvi.

== Journalism and literary career ==
He served as editor of the Hebrew Ha-Zefirah, the Hebrew weekly Ha-Olam and the Yiddish daily, Haynt.

Gruenbaum was the editor of the Encyclopedia of Diaspora Communities, The Zionist Movement and its Development and many other books.

== Commemoration ==
Alonei Yitzhak, an Israeli youth village near Binyamina in northern Israel, is named for him.

== Famous quote by Yitzhak Gruenbaum ==
“I think it is necessary to state here – Zionism is above everything.” and “I will not demand that the Jewish Agency allocate a sum of 300,000 or 100,000 pounds sterling to help European Jewry. And I think that whoever demands such things is performing an anti-Zionist act.” Stated at a 1942 gathering in pre-state Israel (Yishuv) about rescue of Jews in Europe.
