= Gan Shmuel =

Gan Shmuel: גַּן שְׁמוּאֵל (Hebrew)
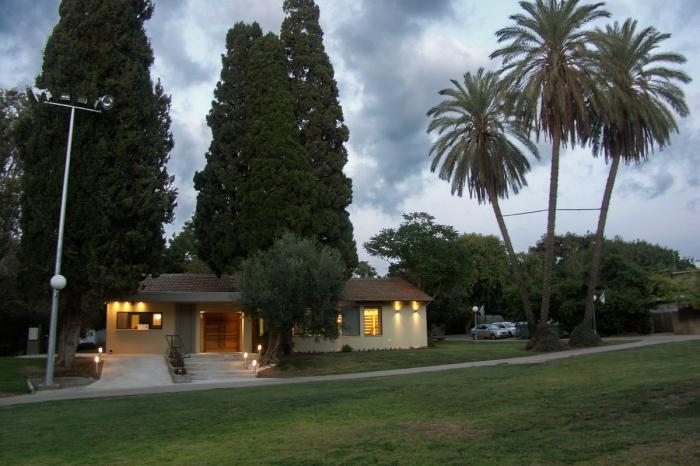

- Location within Haifa region of Israel Location within Israel
- Coordinates: 32°27′13″N 34°56′59″E
- Country: Israel
- District: Haifa
- Subdistrict: Hadera
- Council: Menashe Regional Council
- Affiliation: Kibbutz Movement
- Founded: 1913
- Founder: Eastern European Jews
- Area: 19,989 dunams (19.989 km^{2}; 7.718 sq mi)
- Population (2024): 1,226
  - Density: 61.33/km^{2} (158.9/sq mi)
- Website: www.ganshmuel.org.il

Gan Shmuel (Hebrew: גַּן שְׁמוּאֵל, lit. Samuel's Garden) is a kibbutz in northern Israel. Located in Haifa District, east of Hadera, it falls under the jurisdiction of Menashe Regional Council. In 2024 it had a population of 1,226. The kibbutz was named after Rabbi Shmuel Mohilever.

== History ==
During the late Ottoman period, in the 19th century, the area of Gan Shemuel were, according to historian Roy Marom, a part of a wooded, "sparsely populated coastal plain inhabited by Arabic-speaking highland peasants and nomads of Turkmen, Nubian, Egyptian and of Arabian-Peninsular descent". Between 1878 and 1880, Circassian refugees belonging to the Shapsegh, Abadzekh, and Kabardian clans established the village of Mez/Khirbat al-Sarkas, a "modest adobe hamlet stood next to a swamp on the southern edge of the oak woodlands".

Specifically, the lands upon which Gan Shmuel was founded belonged to the Ottoman-era al-Dardara estate. After purchasing al-Dardara in 1891, the founders of the town of Hadera planted Gan Shmuel, a grove of etrogs (1895). The lands of Gan Shmuel were transferred to the Jewish National Fund and a small group of pioneers took it upon themselves to tend to the orchards living in a multi-story house in 1913. The group was recognized as a kibbutz in 1921. According to a census conducted in 1922 by the British Mandate authorities, Gan Shmuel had a population of 48 Jews. The first stable group formed in 1923 and its members were considered the founders of Gan Shmuel. The kibbutz buildings were designed by Arieh Sharon in keeping with the principles of Bauhaus architecture.

== Industry ==
The kibbutz is the owner (43%) of the publicly traded beverage company Gan Shmuel Foods Ltd. Established in 1941, the company exports products to 35 countries throughout Europe and the Far East and is the largest exporter of processed foods in Israel. Since Gan Shmuel Foods' merger with Ganir Ltd. in 2007, Gan Shmuel Group owns the Primor juice brand.

== Sports ==
The kibbutz is host to the Hapoel Gan Shmuel Menashe basketball team, which previously played in the top division of Israeli basketball.

== Notable people ==
- Ehud Adiv, Israeli political scientist
- Ran Cohen, Knesset member 1984–2008
- Yitzhak Gruenbaum, First Minister of Interior 1948–1949, Candidate for President in the 1952 presidential election
- Uri Ilan, IDF soldier captured by Syria
- Fayge Ilanit, Knesset member 1948–1951 (1st Knesset), mother of Uri Ilan
- Shaul Knaz, Israeli artist
- Yohanan Simon, Israeli artist
- Ariel Zilber, Israeli singer-songwriter

== Gallery ==
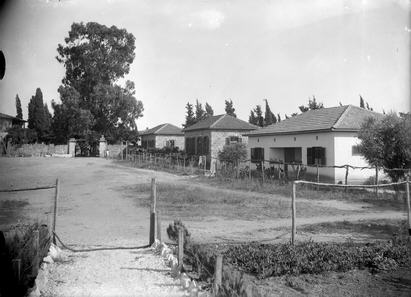
Gan Shmuel (1927)

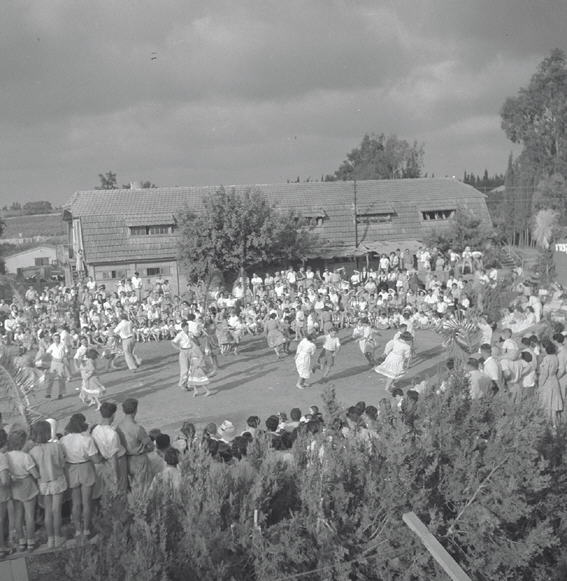
Gan Shmuel (1945)

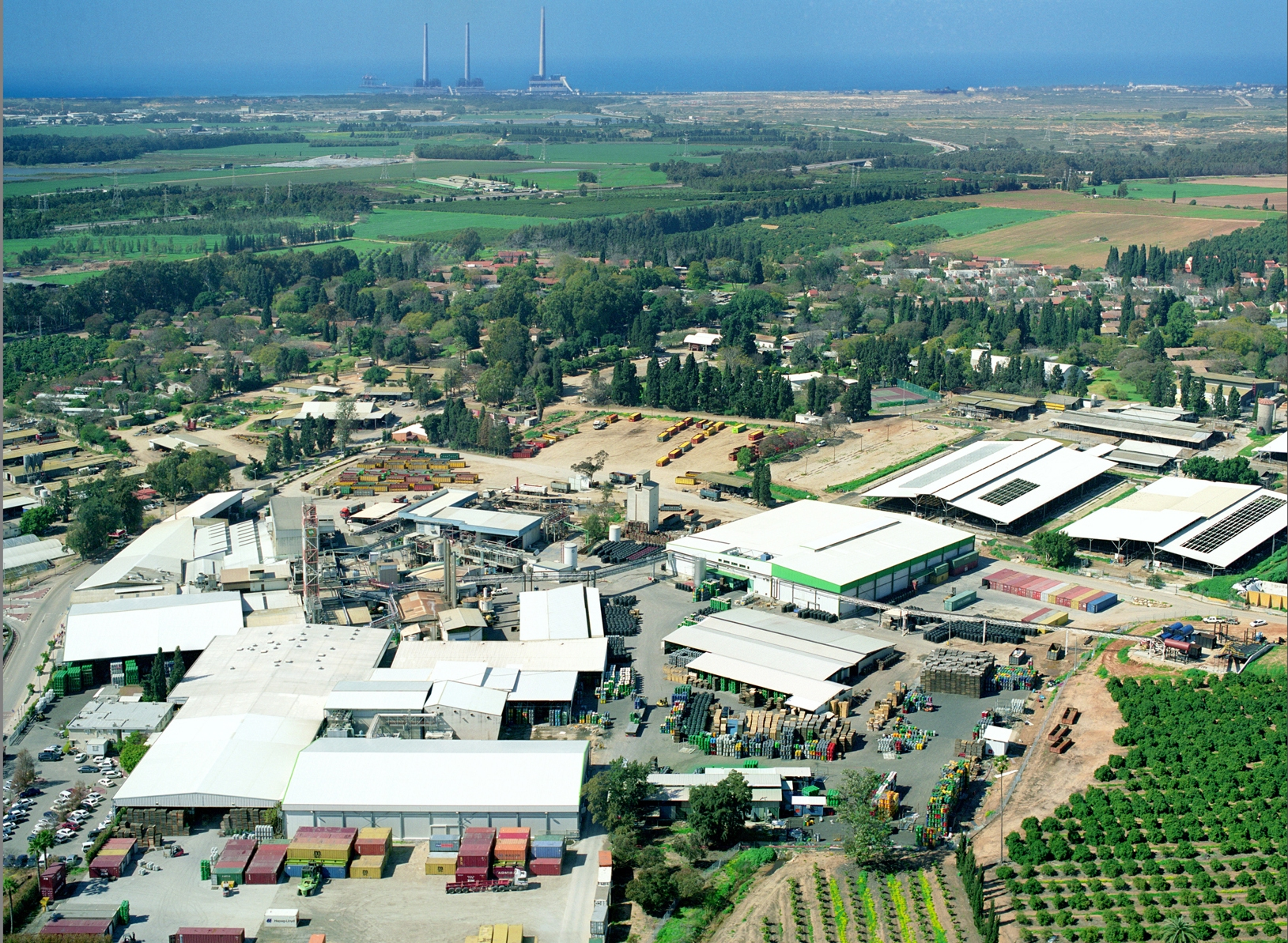
Aerial view of Gan Shmuel (c. 2008)

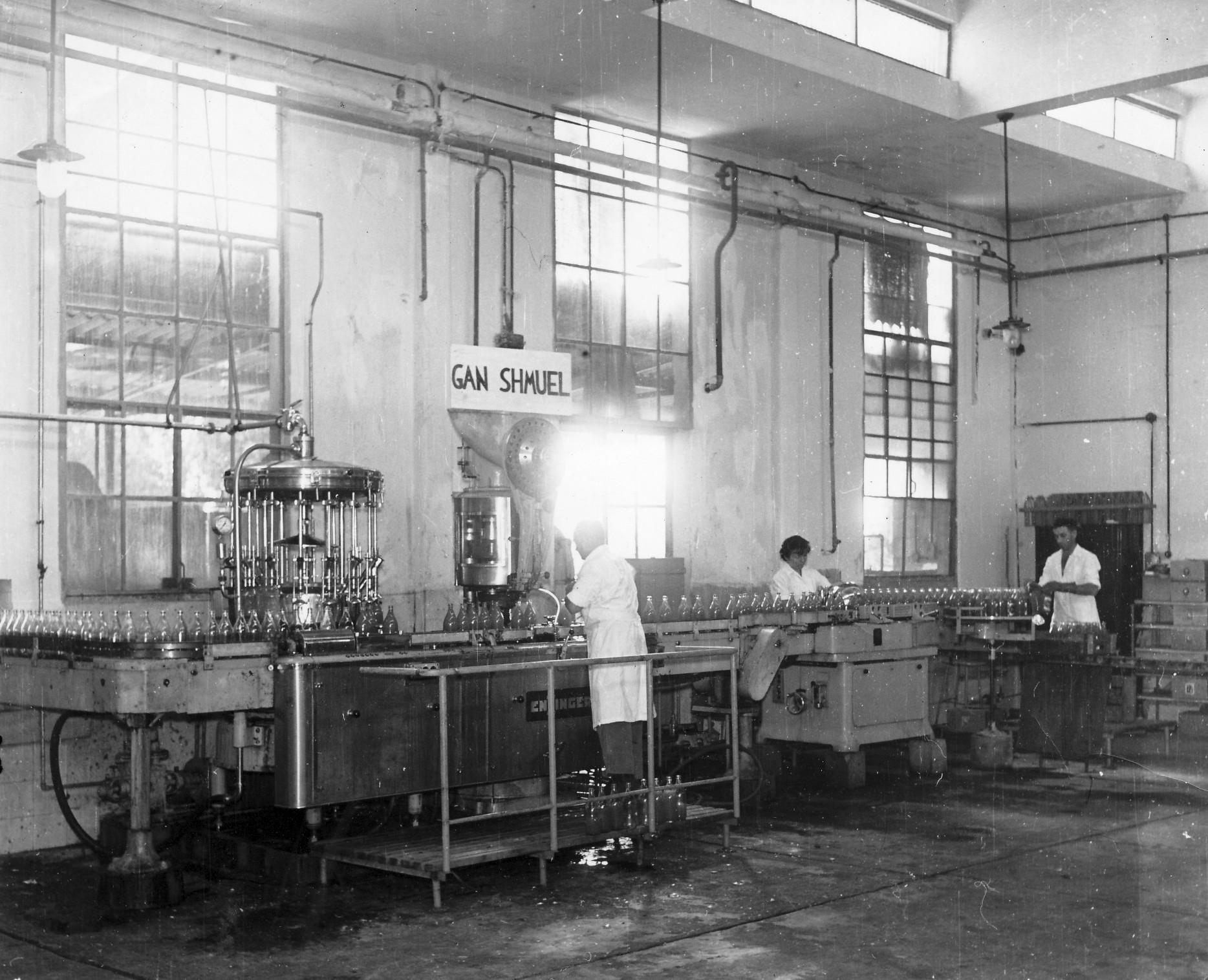
Gan Shmuel juice factory, (c. 1959)

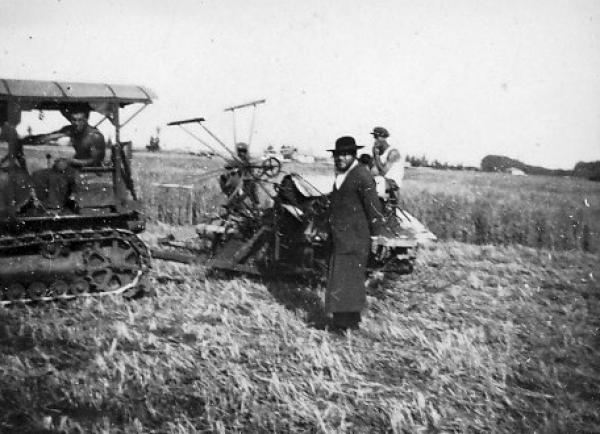
Rabbis from Jerusalem supervise the harvest of wheat in Kibbutz Gan Shmuel, in order to make sure that the wheat is kosher for making Shmurah matzah
(1930–1938)

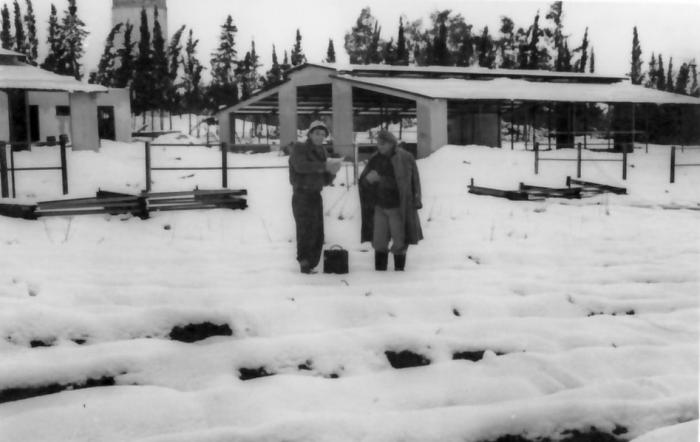
Snow event in Gan Shmuel (1950)
