= Knaz =

Knaz may refer to:

- KNAZ-TV, a television station in Flagstaff, Arizona
- Kenaz or Knaz, meaning "hunter", the name of several persons in the Hebrew Bible
- Shaul Knaz (born 1939), Israeli artist and writer

== See also ==
- Knyaz, a historical Slavic title
