= Uri Ilan =

Israeli soldier captured by Syria who took his own life (1935–1955)

- אורי אילן
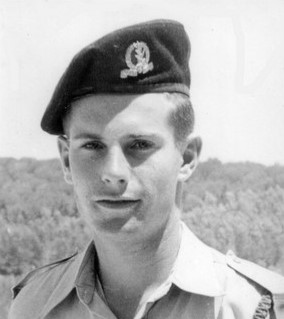
- Born: February 17, 1935; Gan Shmuel, Haifa, Mandatory Palestine
- Died: January 13, 1955 (aged 19); Mezzeh, Damascus, Syria
- Cause of death: Suicide by hanging
- Burial place: Gan Shmuel, Haifa, Israel
- Military career
- Allegiance: Israel
- Branch: Israel Defense Forces
- Service years: 1953-1955
- Rank: Samal (posthumorous)
- Unit: Golani Brigade
- Known for: Circumstances of death

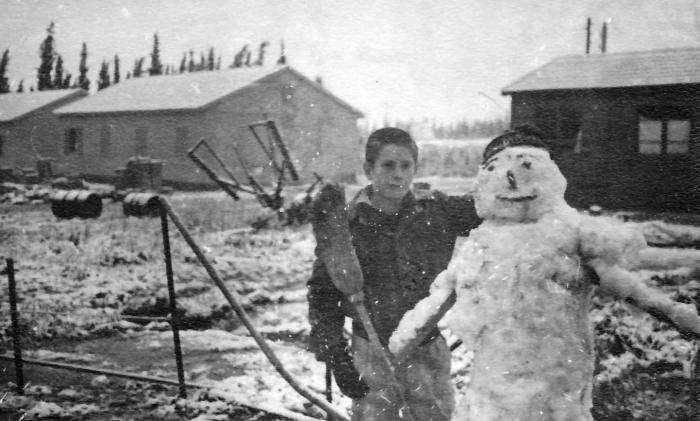
Uri Ilan as a teenager, in the snow in Gan Shmuel, 1950

Uri Ilan (Hebrew: אורי אילן; 17 February 1935 – 13 January 1955) was an Israeli soldier captured by the Syrians during Operation Zarzar on the Golan Heights who took his own life in captivity, after being captured in a covert operation. He became a symbol of courage and patriotism in Israel.

In a note he left in his shoes which was discovered upon examination of his body, He wrote "I did not betray, I committed suicide", so as not to reveal a military secret. Chief of Staff Moshe Dayan quoted from the note the first words "I did not betray", which became a symbol of personal sacrifice for the sake of the country's security.

== Biography ==
=== Early life ===
Mourners, including Israeli Military Chief Rabbi Shlomo Goren, far left, saluting, at the grave of Ilan (1955)

Uri Ilan was born in 1935 in kibbutz Gan Shmuel. His mother was Fayge Ilanit, a member of the First Knesset, and a member of the Mapam faction. Uri was the great-grandson of the famed Talmudic scholar Rabbi Shimon Shkop.

=== Capture and suicide ===
In July 1953, Ilan enlisted in the Golani Brigade. On December 8, 1954, he was sent to an operation (the Zarzar operation) aiming to return a wiretapping device to a telephone line in Syrian territory, near Tel Faher, not far from Kibbutz Dan.

Ilan, together with Lieutenant Meir Mozes, commander of the Golani patrol, joined the squad, which included three paratroopers - Sergeant Meir Jacobi (squad commander), Corporal Yaakov (Jackie) Lind and T.S. Gad Castelnitz. The operation got complicated and the five were discovered and captured. The captives were taken to Quneitra, and from there they were transferred to Mezzeh prison in Damascus, where each of them was held separately.

After the squad was captured, the Minister of Defense Pinchas Lavon authorized Chief of Staff Moshe Dayan to hijack a military plane if it crossed the border or approached it, for bargaining purposes. Dayan ordered the Air Force, contrary to Lavon's opinion, to hijack a civilian plane.

On December 12, the Israeli Air Force planes forced a Syrian civilian plane, which was on its way to Egypt and entered Israeli airspace, to land at Ben-Gurion Airport under false pretenses. On the plane there were ten passengers and crew members. Prime Minister and the Minister of Foreign Affairs Moshe Sharet rejected the proposal to use the passengers as bargaining chips for the exchange of captives. Sharet explained his decision by saying: "we are not pirates, we act like human beings". Fayge Ilanit, Uri's mother, respected Sharett's decision and did not go against it.

In January 1955 Sharet wrote in his diary about the operation in Syria:

"It turned out that the entire organization of this operation was flawed by an alarming irresponsibility. Young people were sent... They were not briefed at all in case of failure, and the result was that in the first investigation they collapsed and told the whole truth." Moshe Sharet, personal diary, volume 3, 1978, p. 649

In the Syrian prison, they were sent to separate cells and tortured.

According to Dan Margalit, international organizations suggested to Fayge Ilanit, Uri's mother, to work for his release, due to the mother being a Mapam member. She agreed, provided that the release would be "not alone. Uri will be released with everyone".

Opinions differ as to Ilan's last days. According to the accepted version, while in captivity, under extreme physical and psychological pressure, Uri was told that his friends had been murdered by the Syrians and if he did not reveal the secret they would kill him as well. As a result, Uri feared that under the pressure of torture, he would reveal the secrets of the operation to the Syrians, thus harming the security of the country. As a result, Uri hanged himself on 13 January 1955 in his prison cell, using a rope made from the fabric of the mattress cover.

When Uri's body was examined, a note was found tied to his leg: "They've already killed everyone, I'm waiting for the verdict, I don't know anything about the rest, bury me next to Gabi, they're going to kill me, revenge". Nine additional notes were found in his clothes, written by punching holes in the form of letters on the paper (the paper was taken from the book "Revenge of the Fathers" by Yitzhak Shemi). The most famous is a scrap of paper on which he wrote the Hebrew words "לא בגדתי. התאבדתי" ("Lo bagadeti, hitabadeti") which means: "I did not betray. I committed suicide," that is to say, he chose to end his own life so as not to reveal military secrets under torture.

He was buried on 14 January 1955 in Kibbutz Gan Shmuel.

In the remarks made by the Chief of Staff, Moshe Dayan, at Ilan's funeral, he chose not to read the end of the note, and thus the message "I did not betray" remained in the public's mind.

According to another version, based on Syrian sources, Ilan fell victim to an interrogation manipulation and revealed the secret he tried to keep. According to Syrian publications, in these days, Israel possessed an eavesdropping device for the Syrian media that transmitted to Israel and even made it possible to transmit false messages. Ilan revealed that the squad was intended to replace the device that was damaged by the moisture it absorbed due to being buried in the ground.

According to the same source, Israel even sent people who were "accidentally" captured and even blackmailed Ilan in prison using violence and put great pressure on him not to say anything about the wiretapping device. However, there is no denying that Ilan committed suicide. According to the Syrian source, it was done by tearing a cloth and hanging his body on the bars of the cell. At the end of that day, his body was returned to Israel.

=== Return to Israel ===
On March 29, 1956, after 15 months of captivity, the four surviving members of the squad were returned to Israel, in exchange for 41 Syrian prisoners, 35 of whom were captured in raids (mainly Operation Kinneret also known as Operation Olive Leaves) conducted in order to collect prisoners for the exchange.

Ilan's suicide and the notes he left behind set off a great outpouring of grief in Israel, but also a sense of national pride.

== Commemoration and legacy ==
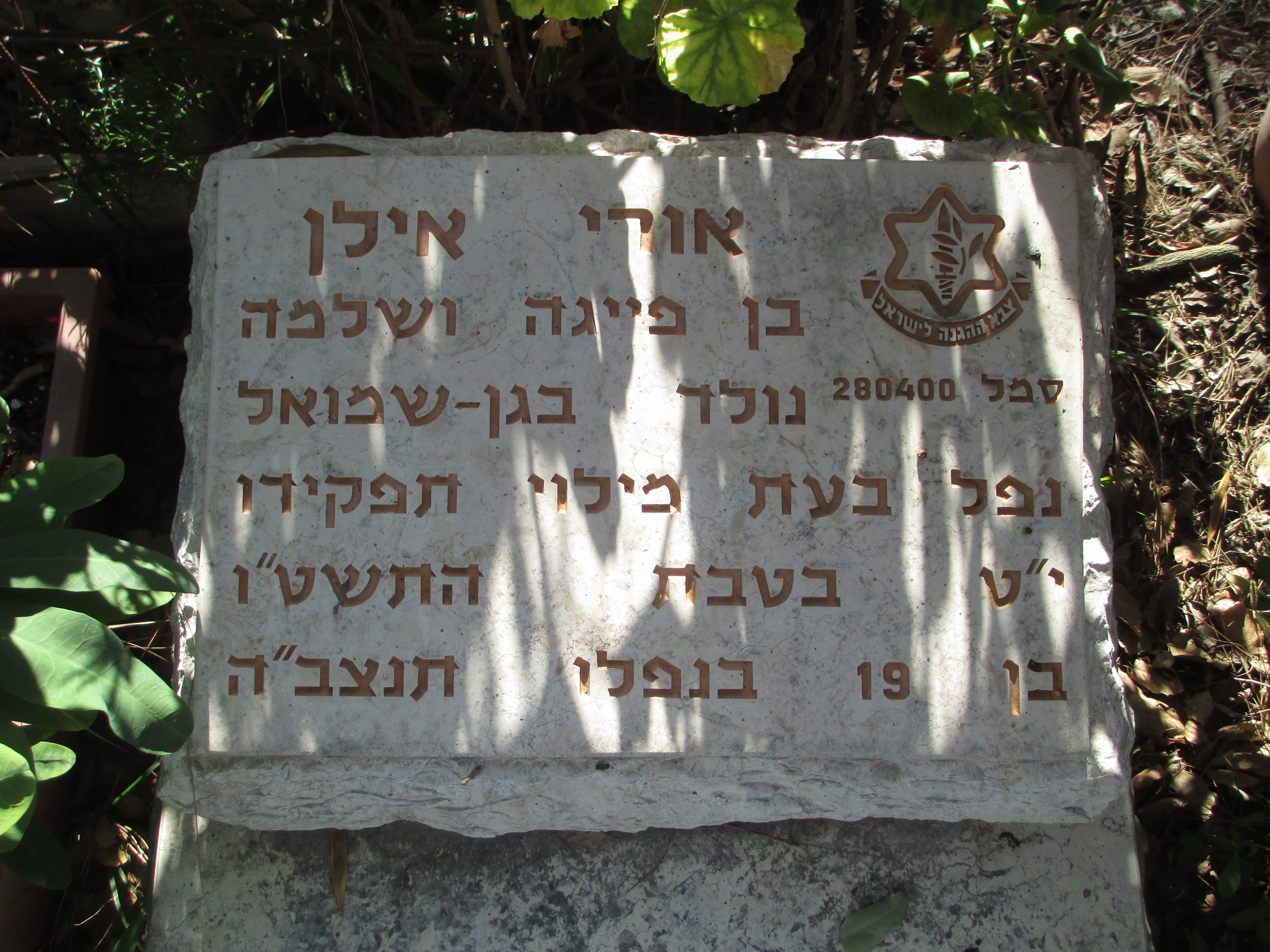
Uri Ilan's grave in Gan Shmuel

The rise of Uri Ilan, who preferred death to the disclosure of military secrets, created an IDF ethos, and was hailed as a miracle by many. Chief of Staff Moshe Dayan was the one to start it, paying tribute to Uri at his funeral, saying the following words:

The 19-year-old soldier, Uri Ilan, carried on his young body, and with the strength of his determined will, the mission of the security of his people, until he reached the limit of his ability and then his will prevailed over his body. Uri came to the end of his path. Attached to his cold corpse, which was returning to his homeland, was a note with his last cry: I did not betray! The army flag is bowed before you - the Hebrew soldier, Uri Ilan.

The poet Nathan Alterman wrote about the event the poem "Uri Ilan" in his series "The Seventh Column", a year after Uri Ilan's suicide (this is a translation of the songs):

From the northern border, from the bridge, he was brought. Sit on his back and relax properly. who's next? This is one of the army boys. This is Uri Ilan. This is one of the children.

This is Uri Ilan who fights for nothing - witness Swept away - horrors - and twisted and twisted and fell. There was perhaps no more bitter and lonely battle Necessary battles, Israel.

From the northern border on palms was brought, From the battle he fought alone, get - to. Between fighting goats and lovers of love. Remember his name, Israel.

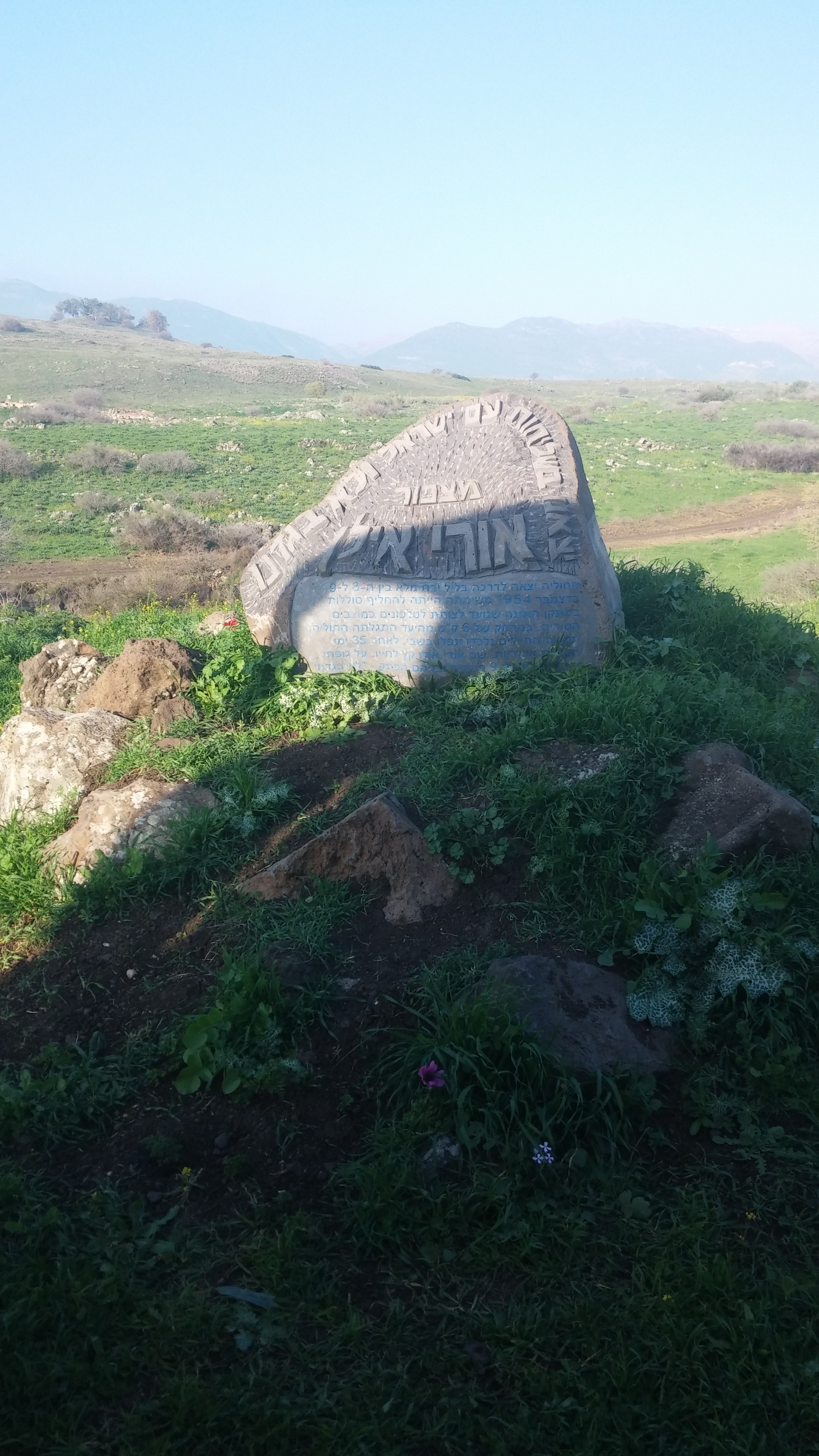
Uri Ilan Trail

A call for revenge was found in one of the notes written by Ilan. The notes were punched on pages from the book "Revenge of the Fathers" by Yitzhaq Shami, published by Mitzpeh in 1927 (it is not known for sure how the book got to Ilan's cell, but it was probably passed on to him through the Jewish community in Damascus). On January 14, 2005, Haaretz newspaper published an article by Moshe Rom and Ze'ev H. Erlich about the book and its messages by Uri Ilan. The authors of the article find a connection between the calls for revenge in the notes and certain passages in the pages of the book where Uri Ilan punctuates his messages, and raise the hypothesis that these passages strengthened Ilan in his decision. However, it is not known if Ilan actually read the book; The plot of the book condemns the tradition of revenge, not praises it.

In 2005, 50 years after Uri Ilan's death, an archive named after him was inaugurated at Bar-Ilan University. The archival material was loaned to the university by members of Ilan's family. The city of Kiryat Shmona, near which the squad was captured, honored his memory and named a street after Uri Ilan. In 1955 Chief of Staff Moshe Dayan wrote to the members of the Ilan family: "We will keep the original notes in the army archive". Since then, the notes have been kept in the Military Intelligence Directorate's archive.

The tour guide Gil Brenner initiated the creation of the "Uri Ilan Trail – We Did Not Betray" documenting the walking route of Uri Ilan and his friends. The path was inaugurated in the winter of 2016 and along it are placed monuments made by the sculptor Yuval Lufen of Kibbutz Ginosar.
