= Talmei Elazar =

Talmei Elazar: תַּלְמֵי אֶלְעָזָר (Hebrew)
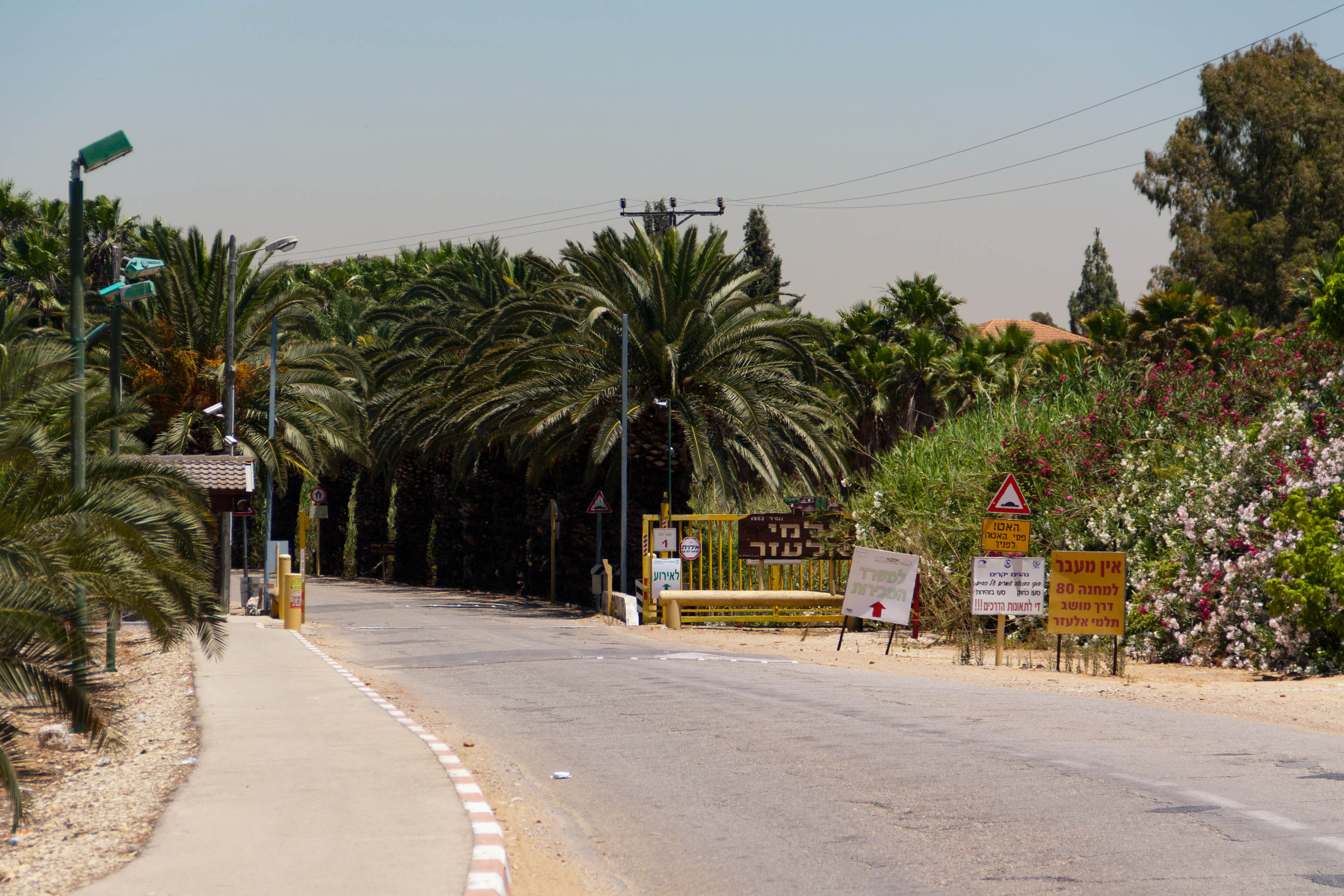
- Etymology: Elazar Furrows
- Location within Haifa region of Israel Location within Israel
- Coordinates: 32°26′43″N 34°58′41″E
- Country: Israel
- District: Haifa
- Subdistrict: Hadera
- Council: Menashe
- Affiliation: Agricultural Union
- Founded: 1952
- Population (2024): 953
- Website: www.talmei-elazar.com

Talmei Elazar (Hebrew: תַּלְמֵי אֶלְעָזָר, lit. 'Elazar Furrows' or 'Elazar Ridge') is a moshav in northern Israel. Located in the eastern Sharon plain to the north-east of Hadera, it falls under the jurisdiction of Menashe Regional Council. In 2024 it had a population of 953.

== History ==
The village was established in 1952 on land that used to belong to the depopulated Palestinian village of Khirbat al-Sarkas, on a site located to the east of the village. It was established by residents of Zikhron Ya'akov and Jewish immigrants from Eastern Europe and Iran. It was named after Elazar Warmassar, one of the heads of the PJCA.

One of the residents runs a health and beauty span that offers snake massages. She uses California and Florida king snakes, corn snakes and milk snakes, claiming that contact with these reptiles is stress-relieving.

Located on the outskirts of the moshav is a carnivorous plant nursery where various species of plants are grown, among them the Nepenthes, which can capture frogs and birds.
