= Khirbat al-Sarkas =

Khirbat al-Sarkas خربة السركس Khirbet as Sarkas
- Village
- Etymology: lit. "The ruins of the Circassians"
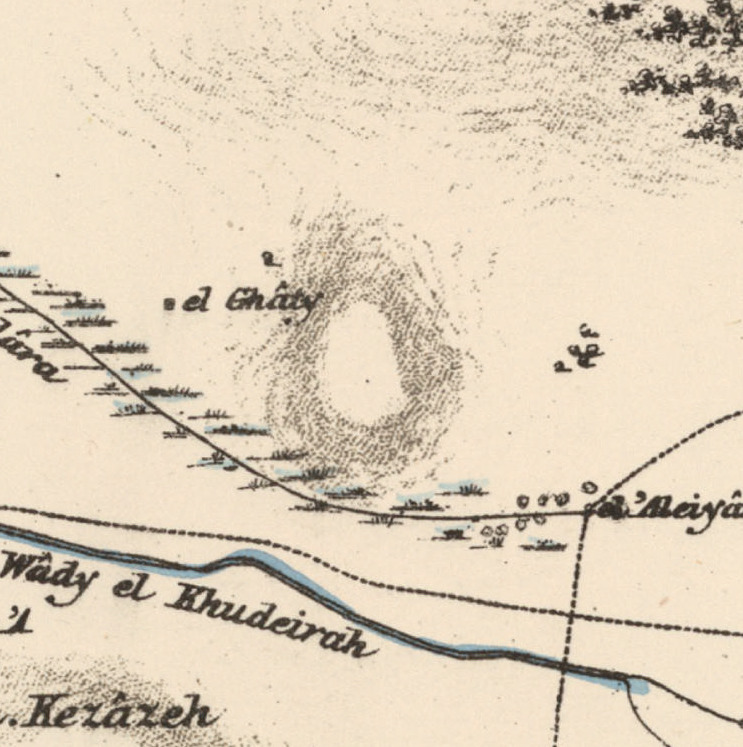
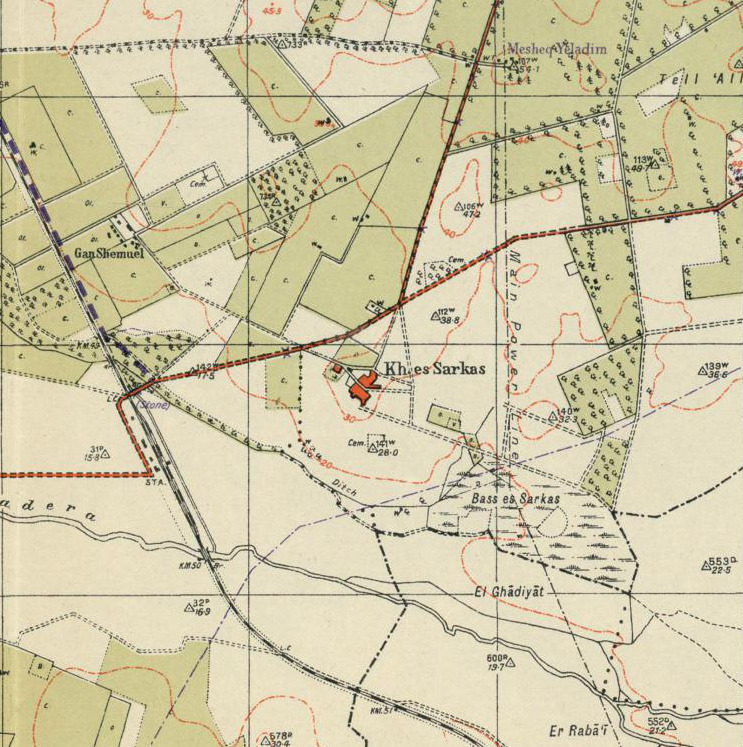
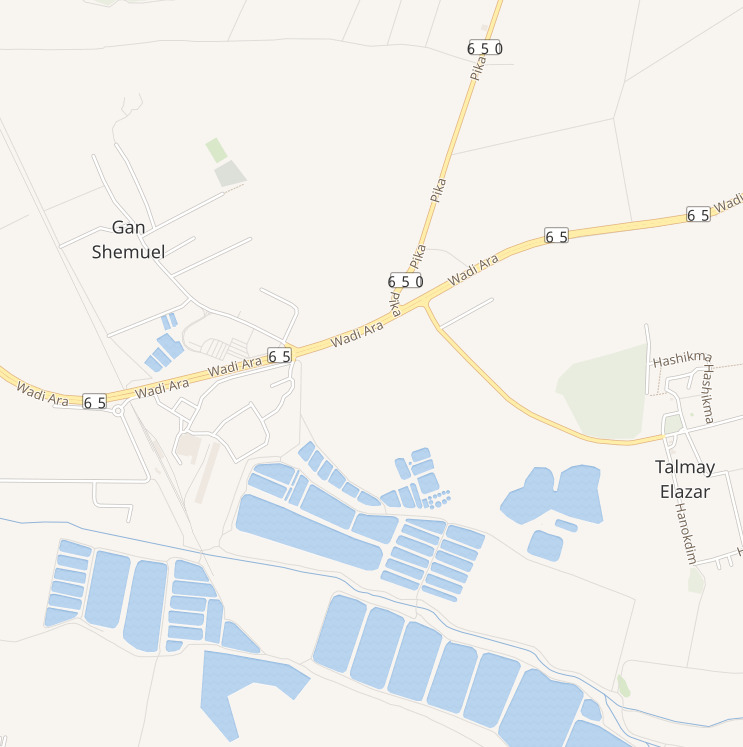
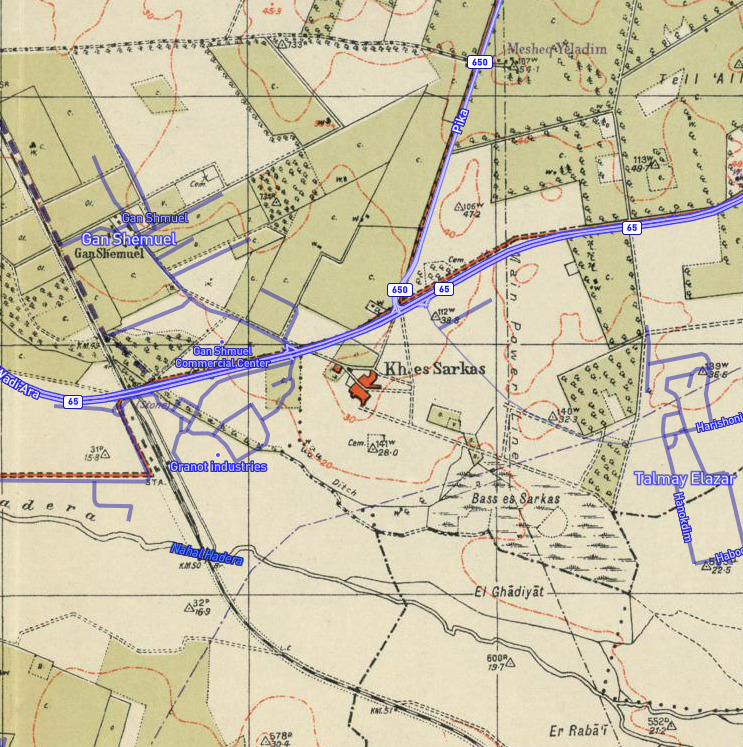
- 1870s map 1940s map modern map 1940s with modern overlay map A series of historical maps of the area around Khirbat al-Sarkas (click the buttons)

- Location within Mandatory Palestine
- Coordinates: 32°26′49″N 34°57′37″E
- Palestine grid: 146/205
- Geopolitical entity: Mandatory Palestine
- Subdistrict: Haifa
- Date of depopulation: 15 April 1948

Population (1931)
  - Total: 383
- Cause(s) of depopulation: Expulsion by Yishuv forces
- Current Localities: Gan Shmuel, Talmei Elazar

Khirbat al-Sarkas (Arabic: خربة السركس) was a village in Palestine, located 42 kilometres south of Haifa. It was depopulated during the 1948 Arab-Israeli war.

== History ==
The village was founded by Circassians from Russia who were expelled from their country by the armies of the Czar in the 19th century, approximately 1860.

A population list from about 1887 showed that Jerakes had 130 Muslim inhabitants, who were noted as "Circassians”.

The village was abandoned by the Circassians because of a Malaria epidemic. It was then settled by local Muslim Arabs.

Gan Shmuel was established in 1913, about 1 km from the village.

=== British Mandate era ===
In the 1922 census of Palestine, conducted by the British Mandate authorities, Kherbet al-Sharkas had a population of 74; all Muslims, increasing sharply in the 1931 census to 383, still all Muslim, in a total of 80 houses.

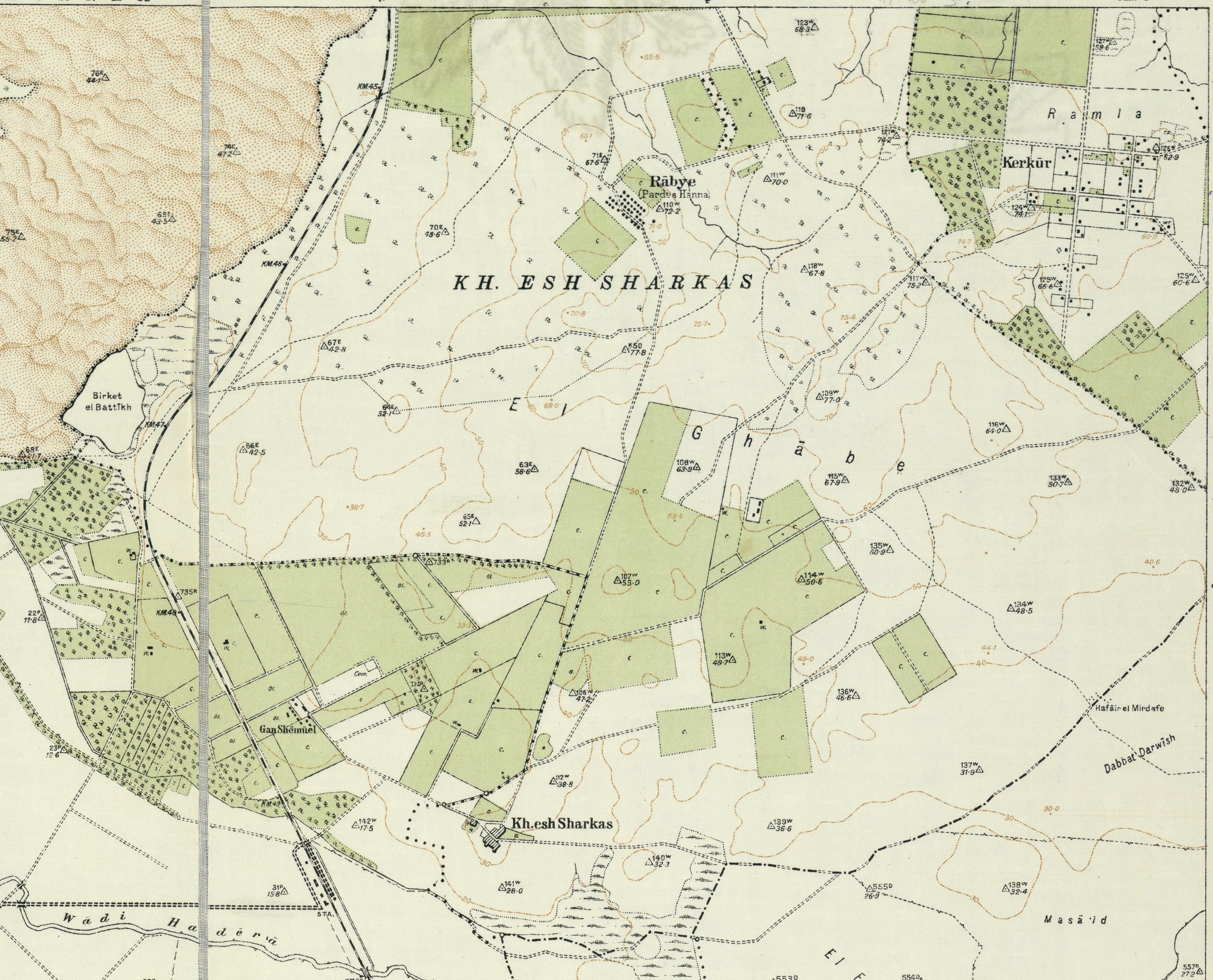
Khirbat al-Sarkas (Kh. es Sharkas) 1932 1:20,000

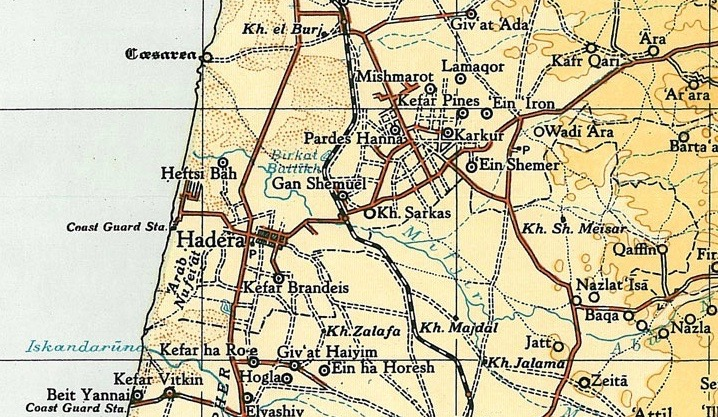
Khirbat al-Sarkas (Kh. Sharkas) 1945 1:250,000

=== 1948, aftermath ===
Though the Arab Higher Command had ordered the evacuation of the village's women and children three times prior to April 1948, the villagers did not leave. Described by Benny Morris as "a friendly village", it was nonetheless one of the villages depopulated at the order of the Israeli Haganah, per their policy to clear the coastal plain of Arab villages in the lead up to the 1948 Arab-Israeli war. The women and children left between 20 April and 22 April 1948, and the men a few days later.

Talmei Elazar was established near the village site in 1952.

In 1992 the place was described: "Cactuses and spikes of grain are scattered across the site; there are no traces of any landmarks or houses. The land near the site is used by Israeli farmers for raising cattle and growing citrus."

== Bibliography ==
- Barron, J.B., ed. (1923). Palestine: Report and General Abstracts of the Census of 1922. Government of Palestine.
- Khalidi, W. (1992). All That Remains: The Palestinian Villages Occupied and Depopulated by Israel in 1948. Washington D.C.: Institute for Palestine Studies. ISBN 0-88728-224-5.
- Mills, E., ed. (1932). Census of Palestine 1931. Population of Villages, Towns and Administrative Areas. Jerusalem: Government of Palestine.
- Morris, B. (2004). The Birth of the Palestinian Refugee Problem Revisited. Cambridge University Press. ISBN 978-0-521-00967-6.
- Oliphant, L. (1887). Haifa, or Life in Modern Palestine. Edinburgh and London: Blackwood.
- Schumacher, G. (1888). "Population list of the Liwa of Akka". Quarterly Statement - Palestine Exploration Fund. 20: 169–191.
