= Fayge Ilanit =

Zionist activist and Israeli politician (1909– 2002)

- פייגה אילנית
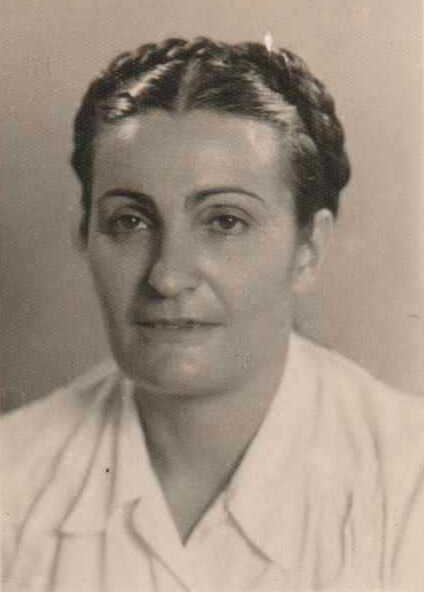

Faction represented in the Knesset
- 1949–1951: Mapam

Personal details
- Born: 7 February 1909 Brańsk, Belsky Uyezd, Grodno Governorate, Russian Empire
- Died: 14 July 2002 (aged 93) Gan Shmuel, Israel

Fayge Ilanit (née Hindes) (Hebrew: פייגה אילנית; 7 February 1909 – 14 July 2002) was a Zionist activist and Israeli politician. She was a granddaughter of Rabbi Shimon Shkop and mother of IDF soldier Uri Ilan.

Fayge Ilanit and her husband Shlomo Ilan (in the center of the photo), at the funeral of their son Uri in January 1955. On the left (saluting) Rabbi Shlomo Goren

== Biography ==
Fayge Ilanit was born Fayge Hindes in Brańsk in the Russian Empire (now Poland) in 1909 to Rabbi Shraga Faivel Hindes and Hannah Shkop (daughter of Rabbi Shimon Shkop). Fayge moved with her family to Kharkov, Ukraine in 1915, and studied in the Russian gymnasia in Sumy. After her mother's death and her father's remarriage, Fayge returned to Poland and then lived with her grandparents in Brańsk.

In 1922, Fayge moved to Grodno and joined the local chapter Hashomer Hatzair, where she became a leading figure, and was elected to the movement's national council.

In February 1929, she immigrated to Mandatory Palestine, and came to Hadera. In November of that same year, she moved to Binyamina, working in the orchards and paving roads. She joined the Hagana in

In 1933, Fayge joined kibbutz Gan Shmuel. She then married Shlomo Ilan and, in 1935, she gave birth to her firstborn child, Uri Ilan. She and her husband had three other children: Roni, Hannah, and Shimon. Fayge was active in the “Women’s Labor Council” and was a member of the secretariat of the “Women’s Labor Council”. She was also a member of the central institutions of Mapam and was active in the League for Friendly Relations with the Soviet Union. Fayge was also a member of the Haganah.

Fayge was elected to the first Knesset for Mapam and was a member of the House and Education and Culture Committees. She opposed the Palestine Communist Party and rejected claims of anti-religious coercion in the immigrant camps.

She became blind in her old age and died in 2002.
