= Eliezer Gruenbaum =

Polish Jewish communist activist (1908–1948)

Eliezer Grynbaum or Eliezer Gruenbaum (Hebrew: אליעזר גרינבאום; 27 November 1908 – 22 May 1948) was a Polish Jewish communist activist. During World War II, he was a kapo in the Auschwitz concentration camp. After the war, he wrote memoirs about his experiences.

== Biography ==
Eliezer Gruenbaum was born in Warsaw in 1908, the second son of a prominent Polish-Jewish politician Yitzhak Gruenbaum. With his father's help, Eliezer arrived in Mandatory Palestine in 1946, where he started writing memoirs. He was subjected to "attacks by right-wing and religious groups eager, among other things, to discredit his father."

Due to his past, the Haganah refused to draft him, however following a plea from his father to David Ben-Gurion he was enlisted. He died in 1948 Arab–Israeli War during the Battle of Ramat Rachel on 22 May 1948. After his death rumors spread that he committed suicide or might have been murdered in revenge for his kapo past.

== Political activism ==
Aged 16, he joined the Communist Party of Poland and, in 1929, was imprisoned by Polish authorities for four and half years for his communism-related activism. The Communist Party was at that time illegal in Poland. He escaped or was released early from prison after serving two or two and a half years, sources vary, and then moved to Paris, where he was an editor of a Polish worker's newsletter.

He fought in the Spanish Civil War on the Republican side, and after returning to France, was again arrested, this time by the French authorities, on charges of sedition. Here, the accounts vary again, according to another source, he was arrested in Spain, but escaped safely back to France. After the German invasion of France, he volunteered for the French Army, eventually joining the Polish Army in France, and later joined the French Resistance.

== Deportation to Auschwitz ==
In 1942 he was arrested, as a communist, not as a Jew, and sent to Auschwitz concentration camp. In Auschwitz, he became a kapo, a title given to prisoners supervising forced labor or carrying out administrative tasks. He survived the camp, and after the war he was accused of collaboration with Nazi Germany, and of "mercilessly beating inmates". He was also accused of murdering "tens of thousands of Jewish prisoners".

He defended himself claiming that he only accepted the position at the request of other Jews, who wanted one of their own in the position, which was otherwise often filled by antisemitic non-Jewish people, including German criminals. Research based on analysis of his memoirs, however, concluded that he became a kapo due to "intervention by communists". At the end of 1943 Gruenbaum was moved from the concentration camps to work in coal mines in Jawiszowice, and finally ended in the Buchenwald concentration camp.

In 1945, after the war, he was tried by a communist tribunal on charges of participating in violent beatings, but was shortly acquitted. He resumed his political activities, advocating for the communist takeover of Poland, but he was soon arrested again, in France, accused by fellow Jews of having been the “head of the Birkenau death camp.”

In a trial that lasted eight months, he was acquitted again, because the French court concluded that "neither the accused nor the victims were French". As noted by Galia Glasner-Heled and Dan Bar-On, "Eliezer Gruenbaum was never formally convicted, but nor was he actually acquitted of these accusations". He was not welcomed in France, nor in Poland, where the communist party expelled him from his ranks.

== Published works ==
His memoirs has been called "an extraordinary piece of testimony", since it is the only document of its type written by a concentration camp kapo. They were partially published in 1952 in the Scrolls of Fire album, and their inclusion in this memorial book is attributed to his father's political pressure. At that time, he was Israel's Minister of the Interior. The excerpt published in the Scrolls... album is titled 'In the Courtyards of Death'.
