= 1952 Israeli presidential election =

- 8 December 1952

120 members of the Knesset Simple majority of votes needed to win
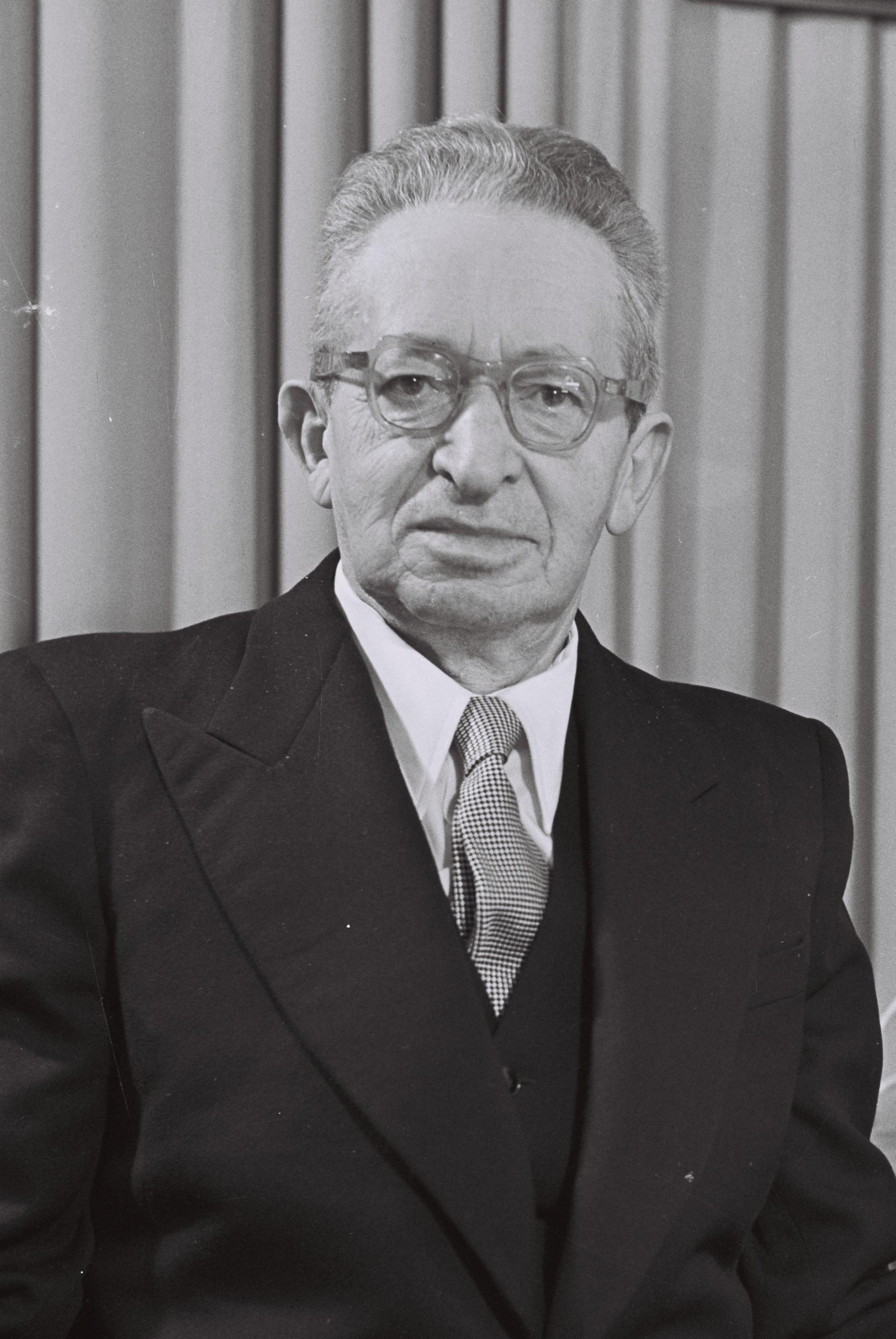

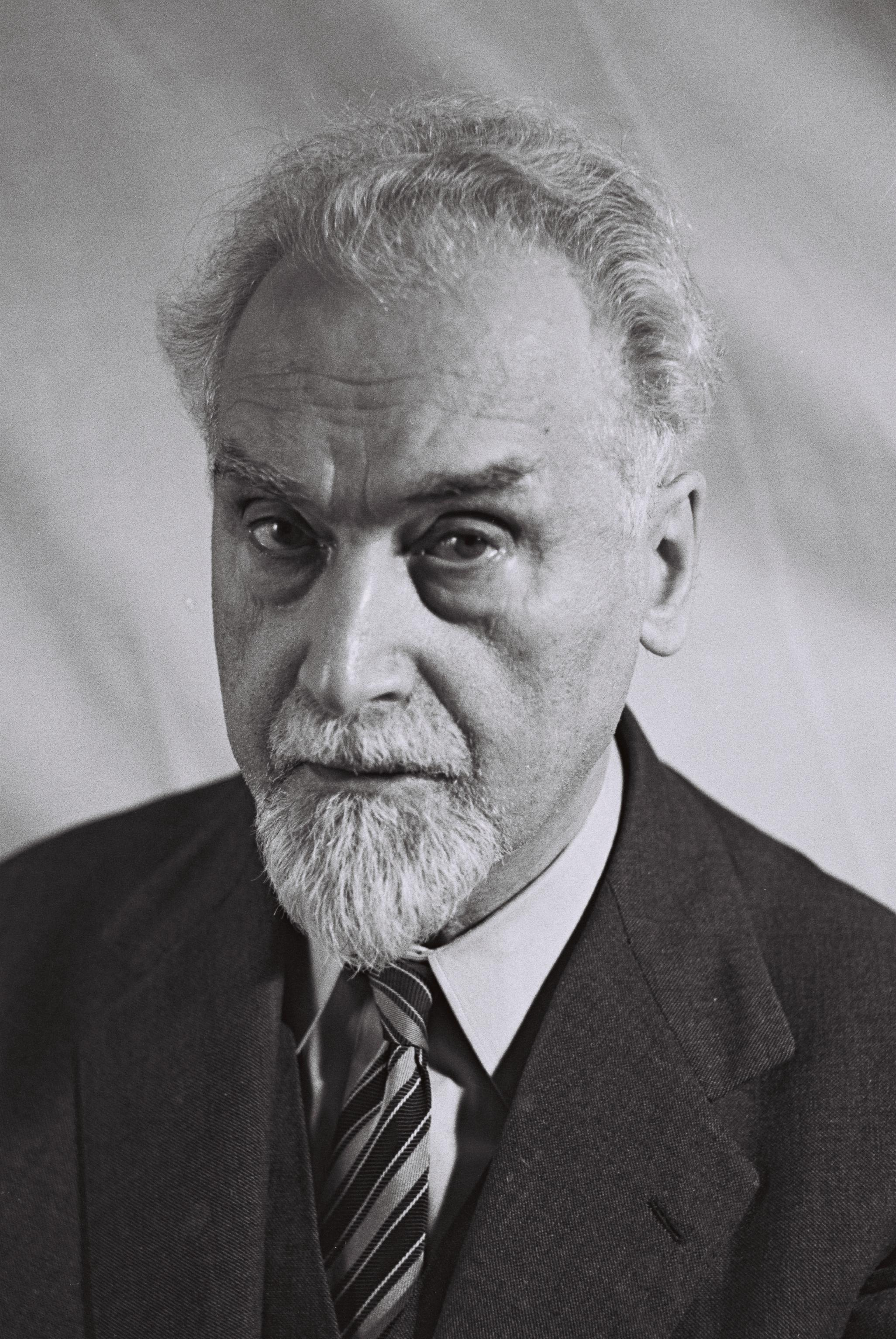

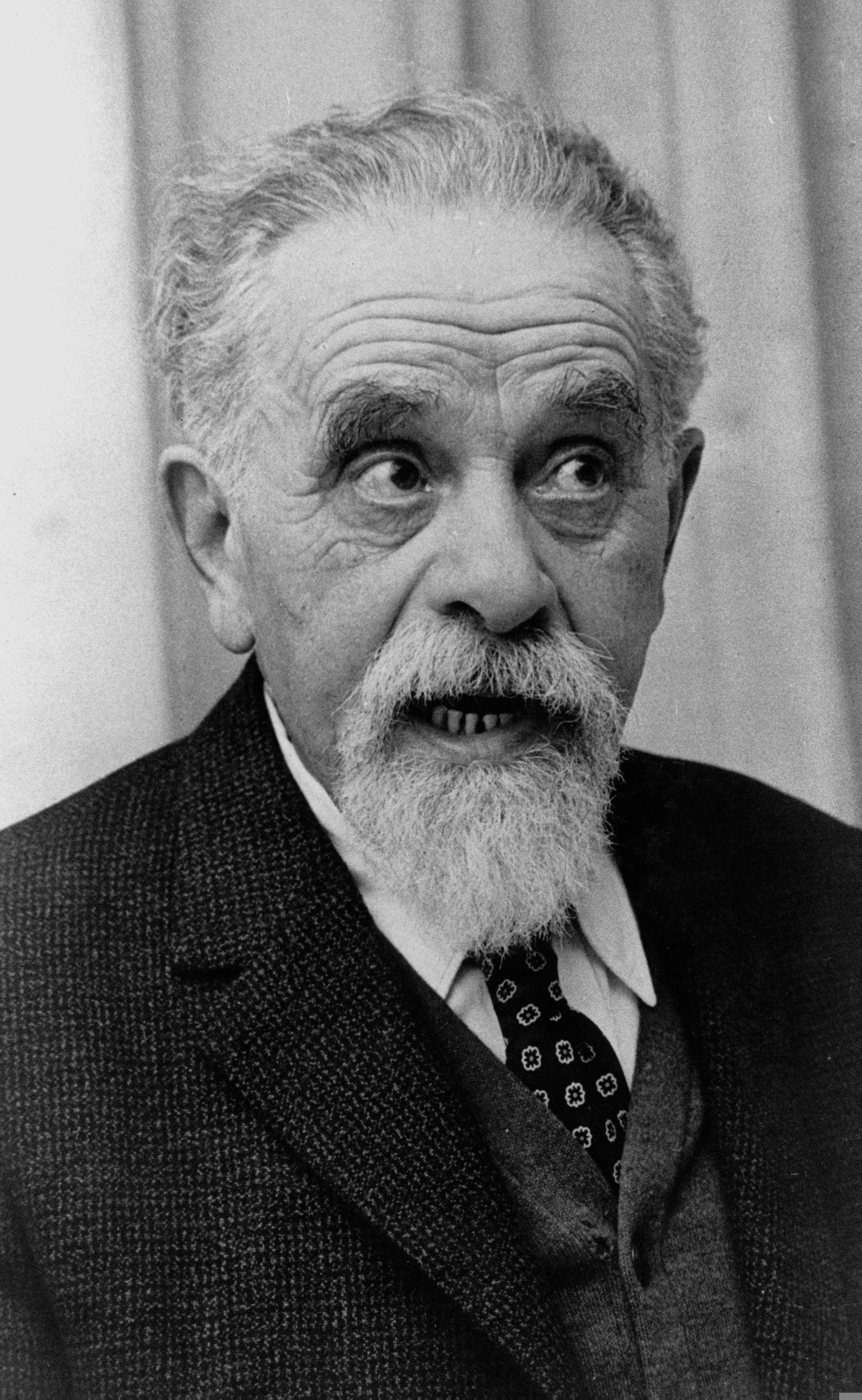
Nominee	Yitzhak Ben-Zvi	Mordechai Nurock	Yitzhak Gruenbaum
Party	Mapai	Mizrachi	Independent
Electoral vote	62	40	5
President before election
Chaim Weizmann
Elected President
Yitzhak Ben-Zvi
Mapai

An election for President of Israel was held in the Knesset on 8 December 1952 following the death of the Israel's first president, Chaim Weizmann on 9 November. Between Weizmann's death and the winner of the election, Yitzhak Ben-Zvi, taking office on 16 December, Knesset speaker Yosef Sprinzak served as acting president.

== Candidates ==
There were four candidates:

- Yitzhak Ben-Zvi: One of the founders of Mapai (the ruling party, for whom he was a member of the Knesset) and the Histadrut (the country's largest trade union), a former president of the Vaad Leumi, signatory of the Israel declaration of independence and a personal friend of Prime Minister David Ben-Gurion.
- Peretz Bernstein: A member of the Knesset for the General Zionists and also a signatory of the country's declaration of independence.
- Yitzhak Gruenbaum: A signatory of the Israeli declaration of independence, a minister in the provisional government, and though an adherent of Mapam, not a member of any political party.
- Mordechai Nurock: A member of the Knesset for Mizrachi and Minister of Postal Services in the government at the time.

Before the election, Albert Einstein was spoken to by Abba Eban about the possibility of becoming President. He declined, explaining, "I have neither the natural ability nor the experience to deal with human beings."

== Results ==
Three rounds of voting were required after no candidate gained an outright majority. Peretz Bernstein dropped out after the second round, with Yitzhak Ben-Zvi elected in the third round.

Candidate	Party	First round		Second round		Third round	
Candidate	Party	Votes	%	Votes	%	Votes	%
Yitzhak Ben-Zvi	Mapai	48	48.98	48	48.48	62	57.94
Mordechai Nurock	Mizrachi	15	15.31	15	15.15	40	37.38
Yitzhak Gruenbaum	Independent	17	17.35	18	18.18	5	4.67
Peretz Bernstein	General Zionists	18	18.37	18	18.18		
Total		98	100.00	99	100.00	107	100.00
Valid votes		98	89.09	99	89.19	107	95.54
Invalid votes		0	0.00	0	0.00	0	0.00
Blank votes		12	10.91	12	10.81	5	4.46
Total votes		110	100.00	111	100.00	112	100.00
Registered voters/turnout		120	91.67	120	92.50	120	93.33
