= Shaul Knaz =

Israeli artist and author (1939-2022)

- שאול קנז
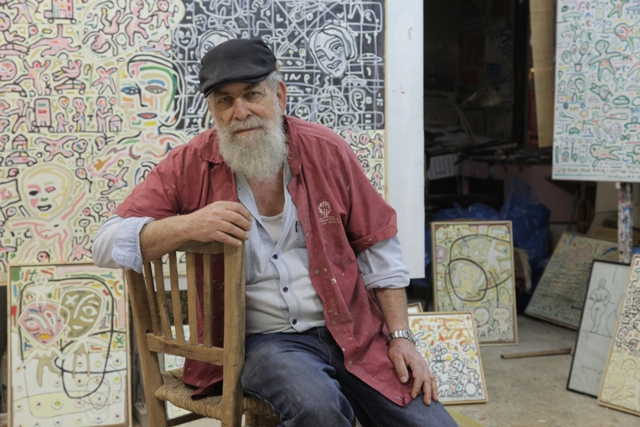
- Born: 1939; Gan Shmuel, Israel
- Died: 2022 (aged 82–83)
- Occupations: Artist & writer

Shaul Knaz (Hebrew: שאול קנז: born 1939) is an Israeli artist and writer, working and living in Gan Shmuel, a kibbutz in the Haifa District of Israel.

== Life and career ==
Shaul Knaz, born and raised in Kibbuz Gan Shmuel, Israel, is a self-taught artist. From the beginning of his work, he says that art has always been his personal paradise of freedom. Art is his major occupation in which he creates paintings and works in print, writings and illustrations on social-political issues. In his works he overcomes what he calls the "gravitational force of life," an idea which through the years he has tried to integrate into his art as a graphic artist and as an illustrator and designer. During the 1970s, Shaul worked in illustration and graphic editing for " Haaretz ","La Merhav" and " The Green Page ".

In 2004 Shaul completed the construction of a large mural in Gan Shmuel, using the gray block wall surrounding the factory warehouses and turning it into a wall with a statement, welcoming those entering the kibbutz. In July 2003, he began working with the assistance of a professional plasterer, and six months later completed the job. This wall which is 180 m. is divided into 4 main sections and reflects Kibbutz Gan Shmuel as a whole. Shaul has developed a special technique for designing this wall using plaster and acrylic paints that are resistant to the weather.

His paintings appear as colorful mosaic of small images repeated in endless variations filling the entire picture surface. Knaz references his immediate surroundings people, objects, actions and translates it into an abridged dictionary of terms that includes representational human figures, familiar everyday objects, and sometimes words and parts of sentences. The letters that make up the words represent an ideology, but their linear presence also serves to connect between the visual imagery and the written word, turning both into signs This is an intimate world translated into recurring images of human figures with remote expressions, a colorful map made of "sign posts", a kind of primitive wall painting. According to Knaz, describing the existence of contemporary human beings means making 'social art' and expressing a political position. 'Being an artist doesn't just imply painting', he says. 'It is a way to live and an ideology. An artist is never happy with what exists and always works for change. Whether the artist lives in Israel, in a Kibbutz or anywhere else, the artist will continue to get involved'.

== Selected Exhibitions ==
- 1985 Metzuda Gallery in Caesarea
- 1984 Gallery Tzavta, Tel Aviv
- 1993 Hatzer HaMoshava, Hadera
- 1996 Migdal Gallery, Tel Aviv
- 2010 Gan Shmuel Gallery
- 2012 The Museum of Israeli Art, Ramat Gan – Solo Exhibition, The World of Saul, Letters from the Land of Israel.
- 2013 Ermanno Tedeschi Gallery – Rome, Italy
- 2015–2016 Galerie Gugging, Vienna, Austria – Layout for a Dream (Solo Exhibition)
- 2016 Collezione Fabio e Leo Cei, Casale Monferrato, Italy – The Long Future (with Mehrdad Rashidi)
- 2016 Centro Arte e Musica di Mairano, Pavia, Italy – Solo Exhibition
- 2017 Petach Tikva Museum of Art, Petah Tikva, Israel – Letters to Tanks (Solo Exhibition)
- 2021 GH Art Center, Givat Haviva, Israel – Solo Exhibition
- 2021 Knesset (Israeli Parliament), Jerusalem, Israel – Solo Exhibition
- 2023 Gan Shmuel Gallery, Gan Shmuel, Israel – Once I Was...
- 2023 Musée Visionnaire, Zürich, Switzerland – Life Happens!

== Publications ==
- Letters tanks, [Israel]: Headquarters Armor, 1974
- Life is not all, there is also a basketball – 1983
- Collective Kibbutz Artzi movement and Kinney [cartographic material], Tel Aviv: the new pattern Guard, 1983
- Report on the State of the Union as at-1983-1984, political graphics, [Tel Aviv]: Library workers, [1984]
- Peace talks, Tel Aviv, 1989
- Gan Shmuel It ... Stories, Memories ..., Gan Shmuel: Gan Shmuel, 1991
- Who's this kibbutz, [Tel Aviv]: I, 1995
- Kibbutz Artzi – Seventy years ago, seventy faces: 1927–1997, Givat Haviva: Yad Yaari, 1997
- Gan Shmuel 1921–2001, look it up small objects – the oil lamp and Web site tools and instruments between them,
- Kibbutz Gan Shmuel: Gan Shmuel Law, 2001
