= Peretz Bernstein =

Israeli politician

- פרץ ברנשטיין
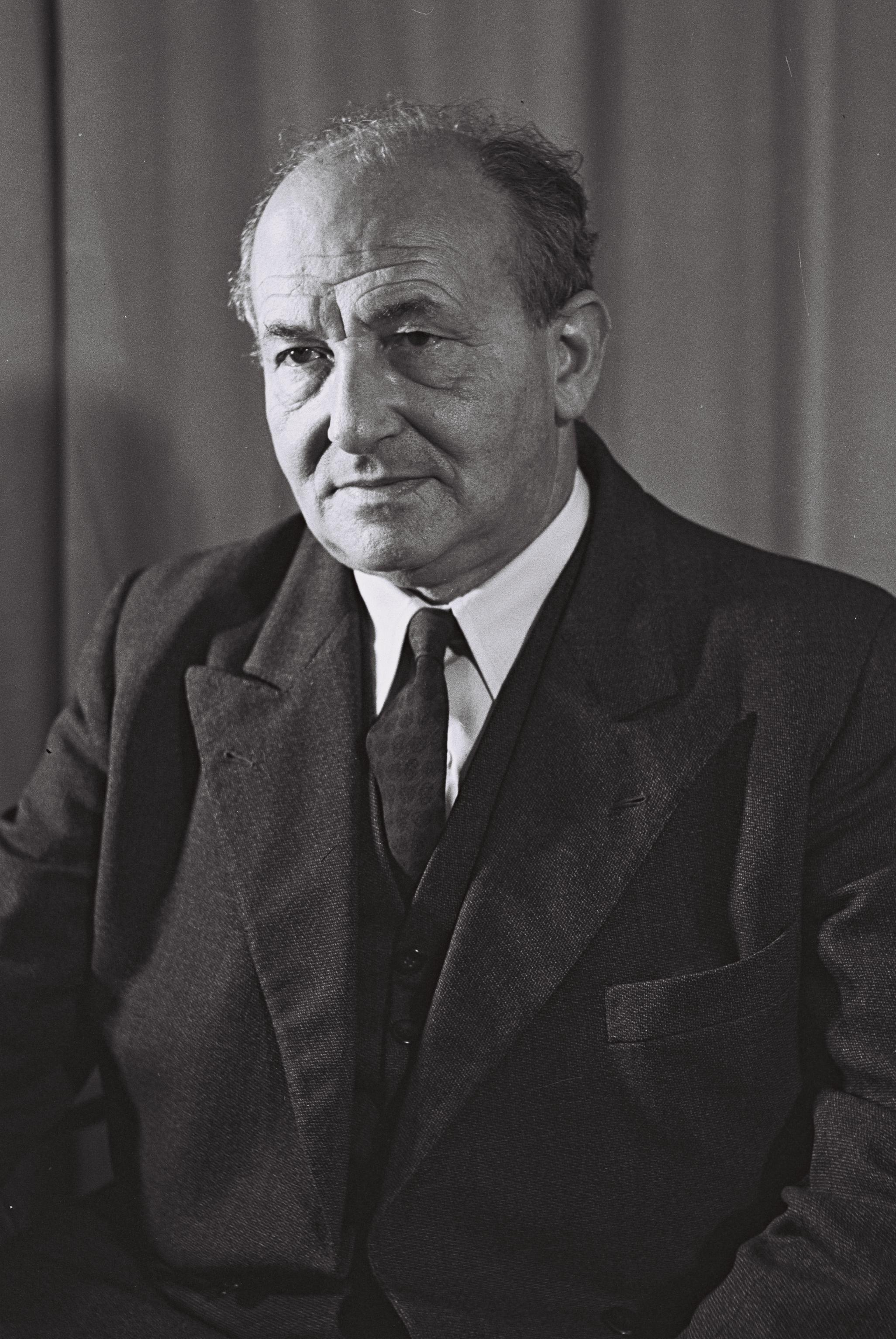
- Bernstein in 1951

Leader of the Opposition
- De facto 29 June 1955 – 3 November 1955
- Prime Minister: Moshe Sharett
- Preceded by: Meir Ya'ari
- Succeeded by: Menachem Begin
- De facto 8 October 1951 – 24 December 1952
- Prime Minister: David Ben-Gurion
- Preceded by: Meir Ya'ari
- Succeeded by: Meir Ya'ari

Ministerial roles
- 1948–1949: Minister of Trade & Industry
- 1952–1955: Minister of Trade & Industry

Faction represented in the Knesset
- 1949–1961: General Zionists
- 1961–1965: Liberal Party
- 1965: Gahal

Personal details
- Born: 12 June 1890 Meiningen, Germany
- Died: 21 March 1971 (aged 80)

Peretz Bernstein (Hebrew: פרץ ברנשטיין; 12 June 1890 – 21 March 1971) was a Zionist activist and German-born Israeli politician and one of the signatories of the Israeli declaration of independence.

== Biography ==
Bernstein was born Shlomo Fritz Bernstein in Meiningen in the German Empire. He moved to the Netherlands before World War I, where he worked in the grain trade. In 1917 he joined the Zionist Organization, serving as secretary and board member. In 1925 he became editor-in-chief of a Zionist weekly, a role he held until 1935, and between 1930 and 1934 served as the Zionist Organization's president.

He emigrated to Mandatory Palestine in 1936, and became editor of the HaBoker newspaper. He joined the Jewish Agency, and became a board member, serving as director of its economics department between 1946 and 1948.

Bernstein was one of the people to sign Israel's declaration of independence on 14 May 1948, and was appointed Minister of Trade and Industry in the provisional government.

He was elected to the first Knesset in 1949 as a member of the General Zionists, but lost his place in the cabinet. Re-elected in 1951, he returned to the cabinet as Minister of Trade and Industry in the fourth and fifth governments. Bernstein also stood as a candidate in the Knesset's election for president in 1952, but withdrew after the second round of voting, having come a distant second to eventual winner Yitzhak Ben-Zvi.

Bernstein returned to the Knesset following the elections of 1955 and 1959, but did not regain his cabinet position. In 1961 the General Zionists merged with the Progressive Party to form the Liberal Party and Bernstein was elected one of its two presidents. He was re-elected to the Knesset later that year and oversaw the alliance with Menachem Begin's Herut to form Gahal. In 1963, he ran again for president, but lost by 67–33 to Zalman Shazar. Bernstein lost his seat in the 1965 elections and died in 1971.

== Bibliography ==
- Anti-Semitism as a Social Phenomenon (1926 in German, 1951 in English, 1980 in Hebrew and also in German. In 2008 a new edition at Transaction Publishers was published. It is the unabridged 1951 text, but the title is changed into The Social Roots of Discrimination. The Case of the Jews . An extensive new preface by Bernard van Praag has been added).
