= List of members of the sixth Knesset =

The 120 members of the sixth Knesset were elected on 1 November 1965. The breakdown by party was as follows:

- Alignment: 45
- Gahal: 26
- National Religious Party: 11
- Rafi: 10
- Mapam: 8
- Independent Liberals: 5
- Agudat Yisrael: 4
- Rakah: 3
- Progress and Development: 2
- Poalei Agudat Yisrael: 2
- Cooperation and Brotherhood: 2
- HaOlam HaZeh – Koah Hadash: 1
- Maki: 1

== List of members ==
Member	Party	Notes
Yigal Allon	Alignment	Party merged into the Labor Party, before reforming the Alignment
Shulamit Aloni	Alignment	Party merged into the Labor Party, before reforming the Alignment
Moshe Aram	Alignment	Party merged into the Labor Party, before reforming the Alignment
Zalman Aran	Alignment	Party merged into the Labor Party, before reforming the Alignment
Moshe Baram	Alignment	Party merged into the Labor Party, before reforming the Alignment
Reuven Barkat	Alignment	Party merged into the Labor Party, before reforming the Alignment
Aharon Becker	Alignment	Party merged into the Labor Party, before reforming the Alignment
Mordechai Bibi	Alignment	Party merged into the Labor Party, before reforming the Alignment
Avraham Biton	Alignment	Party merged into the Labor Party, before reforming the Alignment
Moshe Carmel	Alignment	
Gavriel Cohen	Alignment	Party merged into the Labor Party, before reforming the Alignment
Menachem Cohen	Alignment	Party merged into the Labor Party, before reforming the Alignment
Zvi Dinstein	Alignment	Party merged into the Labor Party, before reforming the Alignment
Abba Eban	Alignment	Party merged into the Labor Party, before reforming the Alignment
Aryeh Eliav	Alignment	Party merged into the Labor Party, before reforming the Alignment
Levi Eshkol	Alignment	Party merged into the Labor Party, before reforming the Alignment
Yosef Fischer	Alignment	Party merged into the Labor Party, before reforming the Alignment
Yisrael Galili	Alignment	Party merged into the Labor Party, before reforming the Alignment
Haim Gvati	Alignment	
Akiva Govrin	Alignment	Party merged into the Labor Party, before reforming the Alignment
David Hacohen	Alignment	Party merged into the Labor Party, before reforming the Alignment
Ruth Haktin	Alignment	Party merged into the Labor Party, before reforming the Alignment
Asher Hassin	Alignment	Party merged into the Labor Party, before reforming the Alignment
Yisrael Kargman	Alignment	Party merged into the Labor Party, before reforming the Alignment
Kadish Luz	Alignment	Party merged into the Labor Party, before reforming the Alignment
Golda Meir	Alignment	Party merged into the Labor Party, before reforming the Alignment
Mordechai Namir	Alignment	Party merged into the Labor Party, before reforming the Alignment
Dvora Netzer	Alignment	Party merged into the Labor Party, before reforming the Alignment
Mordechai Ofer	Alignment	Party merged into the Labor Party, before reforming the Alignment
Baruch Osnia	Alignment	Party merged into the Labor Party, before reforming the Alignment
David Petel	Alignment	Party merged into the Labor Party, before reforming the Alignment
Dov Sadan	Alignment	Party merged into the Labor Party
Pinhas Sapir	Alignment	Party merged into the Labor Party, before reforming the Alignment
Moshe Sardines	Alignment	Party merged into the Labor Party, before reforming the Alignment
Eliyahu Sasson	Alignment	Party merged into the Labor Party, before reforming the Alignment
Bechor-Shalom Sheetrit	Alignment	
Ze'ev Sherf	Alignment	Party merged into the Labor Party, before reforming the Alignment
Shmuel Shoresh	Alignment	Party merged into the Labor Party, before reforming the Alignment
Rachel Tzabari	Alignment	Party merged into the Labor Party, before reforming the Alignment
Ze'ev Tzur	Alignment	Party merged into the Labor Party, before reforming the Alignment
Aharon Uzan	Alignment	Party merged into the Labor Party, before reforming the Alignment
Aharon Yadlin	Alignment	Party merged into the Labor Party, before reforming the Alignment
Yisrael Yeshayahu	Alignment	Party merged into the Labor Party, before reforming the Alignment
Haim Yosef Zadok	Alignment	Party merged into the Labor Party, before reforming the Alignment
Mordechai Zar	Alignment	Party merged into the Labor Party, before reforming the Alignment
Zalman Abramov	Gahal	
Binyamin Avniel	Gahal	
Yohanan Bader	Gahal	
Menachem Begin	Gahal	
Aryeh Ben-Eliezer	Gahal	
Haim Cohen-Meguri	Gahal	
Aharon Goldstein	Gahal	
Yitzhak Klinghoffer	Gahal	
Yosef Kremerman	Gahal	
Haim Landau	Gahal	
Eliyahu Meridor	Gahal	
Ya'akov Meridor	Gahal	
Shlomo Perlstein	Gahal	
Esther Raziel-Naor	Gahal	
Elimelekh Rimalt	Gahal	
Yosef Sapir	Gahal	
Yosef Serlin	Gahal	
Yosef Shofman	Gahal	
Eliezer Shostak	Gahal	Left party to establish the Free Centre
Mordechai-Haim Stern	Gahal	
Yosef Tamir	Gahal	
Shmuel Tamir	Gahal	Left party to establish the Free Centre
Avraham Tiar	Gahal	Left party to establish the Free Centre
Baruch Uziel	Gahal	
Menachem Yedid	Gahal	
Zvi Zimmerman	Gahal	
Shlomo-Yisrael Ben-Meir	National Religious Party	
Yosef Burg	National Religious Party	
Michael Hasani	National Religious Party	
Shabtai Daniel	National Religious Party	
Daniel-Yitzhak Levy	National Religious Party	
Yitzhak Rafael	National Religious Party	
Tova Sanhadray	National Religious Party	
Binyamin Shahor	National Religious Party	
Haim-Moshe Shapira	National Religious Party	
Moshe Unna	National Religious Party	
Zerach Warhaftig	National Religious Party	
Yosef Almogi	Rafi	Party merged into the Labor Party, then the Alignment
David Ben-Gurion	Rafi	Left party to sit as an independent
Mordechai Ben-Porat	Rafi	Party merged into the Labor Party, then the Alignment
Moshe Dayan	Rafi	Party merged into the Labor Party, then the Alignment
Mathilda Guez	Rafi	Party merged into the Labor Party, then the Alignment
Yitzhak Navon	Rafi	Party merged into the Labor Party, then the Alignment
Shimon Peres	Rafi	Party merged into the Labor Party, then the Alignment
Yizhar Smilansky	Rafi	
Mordechai Surkis	Rafi	Party merged into the Labor Party, then the Alignment
Tzvi Tzur	Rafi	
Reuven Arazi	Mapam	Party merged into the Alignment
Ya'akov Hazan	Mapam	Party merged into the Alignment
Abd el-Aziz el-Zoubi	Mapam	Party merged into the Alignment
Natan Peled	Mapam	Party merged into the Alignment
Shlomo Rosen	Mapam	Party merged into the Alignment
Victor Shem-Tov	Mapam	Party merged into the Alignment
Emma Talmi	Mapam	Party merged into the Alignment
Meir Ya'ari	Mapam	Party merged into the Alignment
Gideon Hausner	Independent Liberals	
Moshe Kol	Independent Liberals	
Pinchas Rosen	Independent Liberals	
Yehuda Sha'ari	Independent Liberals	
Yizhar Harari	Independent Liberals	Left party to join the Labor Party, which merged into the Alignment
Shlomo-Ya'akov Gross	Agudat Yisrael	
Yitzhak-Meir Levin	Agudat Yisrael	
Shlomo Lorincz	Agudat Yisrael	
Menahem Porush	Agudat Yisrael	
Emile Habibi	Rakah	
Tawfik Toubi	Rakah	
Meir Vilner	Rakah	
Seif el-Din el-Zoubi	Progress and Development	Party merged into Cooperation and Development, before becoming independent again
Elias Nakhleh	Progress and Development	Party merged into Cooperation and Development, before becoming splitting again. Later left party to establish Jewish-Arab Brotherhood
Kalman Kahana	Poalei Agudat Yisrael	
Ya'akov Katz	Poalei Agudat Yisrael	
Diyab Obeid	Cooperation and Brotherhood	Party merged into Cooperation and Development before splitting again.
Jabr Muadi	Cooperation and Brotherhood	Party merged into Cooperation and Development before splitting again. Later left party to establish the Druze Faction
Uri Avnery	HaOlam HaZeh – Koah Hadash	
Shmuel Mikunis	Maki	

=== Replacements ===
MK	Replaced	Party	Date	Notes
Frija Zoaretz	Shabtai Daniel	National Religious Party	1 December 1965	
Amos Degani	Tzvi Tzur	Rafi	8 December 1965	Party merged into the Labor Party, then the Alignment
Yitzhak Golan	Moshe Kol	Independent Liberals	11 January 1966	
Moshe Wertman	Moshe Carmel	Alignment	17 January 1966	Party merged into the Labor Party, before reforming the Alignment
Shoshana Arbeli-Almozlino	Haim Gvati	Alignment	17 January 1966	Party merged into the Labor Party, before reforming the Alignment
Shlomo Cohen-Tzidon	Eliyahu Meridor	Gahal	16 October 1966	Left party to establish the Free Centre
Amnon Linn	Bechor-Shalom Sheetrit	Alignment	28 January 1967	Party merged into the Labor Party, before reforming the Alignment
Aryeh Bahir	Yizhar Smilansky	Rafi	20 February 1967	Party merged into the Labor Party, then the Alignment
Avraham Verdiger	Ya'akov Katz	Poalei Agudat Yisrael	21 December 1967	
David Golomb	Dov Sadan	Labor Party	9 December 1968	Party merged into the Alignment
Nissim Eliad	Pinchas Rosen	Independent Liberals	23 December 1968	
Ari Ankorion	Levi Eshkol	Alignment	26 February 1969	
