= List of political parties in Israel =

Israel's political system is based on proportional representation and allows for a multi-party system with numerous parties represented in the 120-seat Knesset.

A typical Knesset includes many factions represented. This is because of the low election threshold required for a seat – 1 percent of the vote from 1949 to 1992, 1.5 percent from 1992 to 2003, 2 percent from 2003 to 2014, and 3.25 percent since 2015. In the 2015 elections, for instance, ten parties or alliances cleared the threshold, and five of them won at least ten seats. The low threshold, in combination with the nationwide party-list system, makes it all but impossible for a single party to win the 61 seats needed for a majority government. No party has ever won a majority of seats in an election, the most being 56, won by the Alignment grouping in the 1969 elections (the Alignment had briefly held a majority of seats before the elections, following its formation in January 1969).

As a result, while only four parties (or their antecedents) have ever led governments, all Israeli governments, as of 2024, have been coalitions comprising two or more parties.

== Current parties ==
=== Parties represented in the Knesset ===
The following parties are represented following the 2026 election:

Party or alliance	Constituent parties	Ideology	Political position	Symbol	Leader	MKs
Likud (Note: Part of the national camp.)		Conservatism (Israeli); Zionism; Right-wing populism	Right-wing	מחל م‌ح‌ل	Benjamin Netanyahu	27 / 120
Yashar		Liberal Zionism	Centre	דרך درخ	Gadi Eisenkot	21 / 120
Together	Bennett 2026	Liberal Zionism	Centre to centre-right	רק رق	Naftali Bennett	12 / 120
Together	Yesh Atid	Liberal Zionism	Centre to centre-right	רק رق	Naftali Bennett	12 / 120
Joint List	Balad	Progressivism; Anti-Zionism; Secularism; Israeli Arab interests	Left-wing	ודם و‌ض‌م	Yousef Jabareen	11 / 120
Joint List	Hadash	Progressivism; Anti-Zionism; Secularism; Israeli Arab interests	Left-wing	ודם و‌ض‌م	Yousef Jabareen	11 / 120
Joint List	Ta'al	Progressivism; Anti-Zionism; Secularism; Israeli Arab interests	Left-wing	ודם و‌ض‌م	Yousef Jabareen	11 / 120
The Democrats		Social democracy; Liberal Zionism (Note: The Democrats were founded by the merger of two labor Zionist parties, Israeli Labor Party and Meretz, but The Democrats define themselves as "liberal-democratic Zionist", not officially "labor Zionism".)	Centre-left to left-wing	אמת أ‌م‌ت	Yair Golan	8 / 120
Ra'am		Islamism; Social conservatism		עם ع‌م	Mansour Abbas	8 / 120
Yisrael Beiteinu		Zionism; Secularism; Russian Jewish interests	Right-wing	ל ل	Avigdor Lieberman	7 / 120
Otzma Yehudit		Kahanism; Ultranationalism	Far-right	ב	Itamar Ben-Gvir	7 / 120
United; Torah; Judaism	Agudat Yisrael	Haredi-Ashkenazi interests; Religious conservatism; Social conservatism	Right-wing	ג ج	Ya'akov Asher	7 / 120
United; Torah; Judaism	Degel HaTorah	Haredi-Ashkenazi interests; Religious conservatism; Social conservatism	Right-wing	ג ج	Ya'akov Asher	7 / 120
United; Torah; Judaism	Homat Torat Yisrael	Haredi-Ashkenazi interests; Religious conservatism; Social conservatism	Right-wing	ג ج	Ya'akov Asher	7 / 120
Shas		Haredi Sephardic/Mizrahi interests; Religious conservatism; Social conservatism	Social: Right-wing; Fiscal: Centre-left	שס ش‌س	Aryeh Deri	6 / 120
Religious Zionist Party		Religious Zionism; Ultraconservatism; Ultranationalism	Far-right	ט ط	Bezalel Smotrich	5 / 120
Zehut		Ultranationalism; Right-libertarianism	Far-right		Moshe Feiglin	1 / 120

=== Other parties ===
The following parties do not have Knesset seats at present:

- Ale Yarok
- Amcha Yisrael
- Dor
- Free Democratic Israel
- Haredi Public
- Israel First
- Meimad (held seats between 1999 and 2009 as part of the One Israel alliance)
- New Economic Party
- Noam (held a seat between 2021 and 2026)
- The Reservists
- Tzomet (held seats between 1987 and 1999; for the 1996 elections, it formed a joint "National Camp List" with Likud and Gesher)

== Former parties ==
=== Parties formerly represented in the Knesset ===
Party	First Knesset	Last Knesset	Most MKs	Notes	Ideology
Agriculture and Development	2nd	4th	1	Arab satellite list	Pro-Mapai
Ahi	16th	17th	2	Breakaway from the National Religious Party, joined the National Union alliance (2006–2008), merged into Likud	Religious Zionism
Ahdut HaAvoda	2nd	5th	10	Merged into the Labor Party	Labor Zionism, democratic socialism
Ahva	9th	9th	3	Breakaway from the Democratic Movement	Liberalism
Alignment	6th	12th	63	Became the Labor Party	Labor Zionism, social democracy
Aliya	14th	14th	2	Breakaway from Yisrael BaAliyah	Interests of 1990s post-Soviet migrants
Arab Democratic Party	11th	13th	2	Breakaway from the Alignment, merged into the United Arab List	Pro-Labor Party
Arab List for Bedouin and Villagers	8th	8th	1	Arab satellite list; merged into the United Arab List (1977)	Pro-Labor Party
Atid	13th	13th	2	Breakaway from Yiud	Liberalism
Blue and White	21th	25th	15		
Black Panthers	12th	12th	1	Breakaway from Hadash	Socialism, Mizrahi interests
Centre Party	14th	15th	6	Breakaway from Likud, Tzomet and Labor Party	
Cooperation and Brotherhood	4th	7th	2	Arab satellite list	Pro-Mapai
Cooperation and Development	6th	6th	4	Arab satellite list; merger of Cooperation and Brotherhood and Progress and Development, demerged soon after	Pro-Mapai
Dash	9th	9th	15	Disbanded into the Democratic Movement, Shinui, and Ya'ad	Liberalism
Democratic Choice	15th	15th	2	Breakaway from Yisrael BaAliyah, merged into Meretz-Yachad	Social democracy, interests of post-Soviet migrants
Democratic List for Israeli Arabs	2nd	3rd	3	Arab satellite list	Israeli Arab interest
Democratic Movement	9th	9th	7	Emerged from the break-up of Dash	Liberalism
Development and Peace	9th	9th	1	Arab satellite list	Pro-Labor Party
Druze Faction	6th	6th	1	Breakaway from Cooperation and Brotherhood, merged into Progress and Development	Druze interests
Faction independent of Ahdut HaAvoda	2nd	2nd	2	Breakaway from Mapam, merged into Mapai	Democratic socialism
Fighters' List	1st	1st	1		Revisionist Zionism, Ultranationalism
Free Centre	6th	8th	4	Breakaway from Herut in 6th Knesset, breakaway from Likud in 8th Knesset	
Gahal	5th	7th	27	Became Likud	
General Zionists	1st	4th	23	Merged into the Liberal Party	
Gesher	13th	15th	5	Breakaway from Likud, merged back into Likud	
Gesher – Zionist Religious Centre	10th	10th	2	Breakaway from National Religious Party, merged back into NRP	
Geulat Yisrael	10th	10th	1	Breakaway from Agudat Yisrael	
HaOlim	16th	16th	1	Breakaway from Shinui, merged into Yisrael Beiteinu	
Hapoel HaMizrachi	2nd	2nd	9	Merged into the National Religious Party	
Hebrew Communists	1st	1st	1	Breakaway from Maki, merged into Mapam	
Herut	1st	5th	28	Merged into Gahal	
Herut – The National Movement	14th	15th	3	Breakaway from Likud, joined National Union alliance, ran unsuccessfully in the following two elections and merged back into Likud	Revisionist Zionism
HaTzeirim	14th	14th	1	Breakaway from the Centre Party, merged into Shinui	
Independent Liberals	5th	9th	7	Breakaway from the Liberal Party, merged into the Alignment	
Independent Socialist Faction	8th	8th	2	Breakaway from Ya'ad – Civil Rights Movement	
Jewish–Arab Brotherhood	6th	6th	1	Breakaway from Progress and Development, merged into Cooperation and Brotherhood	
The Jewish Home	18th	23rd	8	Dissolved on 20 August 2023, merged into Religious Zionist Party	Religious Zionism
Justice for the Elderly	17th	17th	3	Breakaway from Gil, merged back into Gil	
Kach	11th	11th	1	Party banned	Religious Zionism, Kahanism
Kadima	16th	19th	29	Breakaway from Likud	Liberalism
Labor	7th	25th	49	Formed by merger of Mapai, Ahdut HaAvoda, and Rafi, merged with Meretz in 2024 to form The Democrats	Labor Zionism, social democracy
Left Camp of Israel	9th	9th	2		Democratic socialism, pacifism
Left Faction	2nd	2nd	3	Breakaway from Mapam	Communism
Lev	15th	15th	2	Breakaway from the Centre Party, merged into Likud	
Liberal Party	4th	5th	18	Merged into Gahal	
Maki (original)	1st	7th	7	Merged into Moked	Communism, non-Zionism
Mapai	1st	5th	47	Merged into the Labor Party	Labor Zionism
Mapam	1st	12th	20	Merged into Meretz	Labor Zionism, democratic socialism
Mekhora	14th	14th	1	Breakaway from Tzomet, merged into Moledet	
Meretz	13th	24th	12	Merger of Ratz, Mapam, Shinui. Merged with Israeli Labor Party to form The Democrats.	Labor Zionism, progressivism
Meri	6th	7th	2	Originally named HaOlam HaZeh – Koah Hadash (until 1973)	Progressivism, left-wing populism
Mizrachi	2nd	2nd	4	Merged into the National Religious Party	
Moked	7th	8th	1	Successor of Maki, erged into the Left Camp of Israel	Socialism, post-Zionism
Morasha	11th	11th	2		
Moria	12th	12th	1	Breakaway from Shas	
Movement for the Renewal of Social Zionism	10th	10th	1	Breakaway from Telem	
National Home	16th	16th	2	Breakaway from the Secular Faction	
National List	7th	9th	5	Merged into Likud	
National Religious Party	3rd	17th	12	Disbanded when The Jewish Home formed	Religious Zionism
New Liberal Party	12th	12th	5	Breakaway from Likud	
New Way	15th	15th	3	Breakaway from the Centre Party	
Noy	16th	16th	1	Breakaway from One Nation, merged into Kadima	
Ometz	9th	11th	3	Breakaway from Likud, merged into Telem, broke away again, merged into Likud	
One Israel (1980)	9th	9th	1	Breakaway from Likud	
One Israel	15th	15th	26	Joint list of Labor Party, Meimad and Gesher	Zionism, Social democracy
One Nation	14th	16th	3	Merged into the Labor Party	
Poalei Agudat Yisrael	2nd	9th	3		
Progress and Development	4th	8th	2	Arab satellite list; merged into the United Arab List (1977)	Pro-Mapai/Labor Party
Progress and Work	2nd	3rd	2	Arab satellite list	Pro-Mapai
Progressive List for Peace	11th	12th	2		Pacifism, socialism
Progressive National Alliance	15th	15th	1	Breakaway from the United Arab List	
Progressive Party	1st	4th	6	Merged into the Liberal Party	
Rafi	5th	6th	10	Breakaway from Mapai, merged into the Labor Party	Labor Zionism
Ratz	8th	12th	6	Merged into Meretz	Progressivism, liberal socialism
Religious Torah Front	3rd	4th	6	Broke up into Agudat Yisrael and Poalei Agudat Yisrael	
Secular Faction	16th	16th	11	Breakaway from Shinui	
Sephardim and Oriental Communities	1st	2nd	4	Merged into the General Zionists	
Shinui	9th	16th	15	Majority of representatives split to form Secular Faction	
Shlomtzion	9th	9th	2	Merged into Likud	
Tami	10th	11th	3	Breakaway from the National Religious Party, merged into the Likud	
Tehiya	9th	12th	5	Breakaway from Likud	
Telem	9th	10th	4	Breakaway from Likud	
The Right Way	17th	17th	1	Breakaway from Justice for the Elderly	
The Third Way	13th	14th	4	Breakaway from the Labor Party	
Tkuma	14th	17th		Breakaway from the National Religious Party, joined the National Union alliance in 1999, disbanded in 2008.	Religious Zionism
Tzalash	16th	16th	1	Breakaway from Shinui	
United Arab List (1977)	8th	9th	3	Merger of the Arab List for Bedouins and Villagers and Progress and Development (not related to contemporary United Arab List)	
United Religious Front	1st	1st	16	Broke up into Agudat Yisrael, Poalei Agudat Yisrael, Mizrachi and Hapoel HaMizrachi	
Unity for Peace and Immigration	12th	12th	1	Breakaway from the Alignment, merged into Likud	
Unity Party	9th	9th	2	Breakaway from Dash and the Left Camp of Israel	Socialism, Mizrahi interests
WIZO	1st	1st	1	WIZO incorporated the Union of Hebrew Women for Equal Rights in Eretz Israel, which had won seats in the Assembly of Representatives.	
Ya'ad	9th	9th	1	Emerged from the break-up of Dash	
Ya'ad – Civil Rights Movement	8th	8th	4	Merger of Ratz and MK Aryeh Eliav, split into Ratz and the Independent Socialist Faction which then merged into the Left Camp of Israel	Progressivism, liberal socialism
Yachad	11th	11th	3	Merged into the Alignment	
Yemenite Association	1st	2nd	1	Merged into the General Zionists but broke away later	
Yisrael BaAliyah	14th	16th	7	Merged into Likud	
Yiud	13th	13th	3	Breakaway from Tzomet	

=== Parties that failed to win seats in the Knesset ===
Name	Letter	Political position	Notes
Hatzohar	ג	Right-wing	Original Revisionist Zionist party, disbanded after failing to cross the electoral threshold in the 1949 elections.
Popular Arab Bloc	ת	Left-wing to far-left	Arab satellite list that ran in the 1949 elections. Affiliated with Mapam
Tafnit	פ	Centre	Ran in the 2006 elections.
Women's Party	נס	Centre-left to Left-wing	Ran in the 1977 elections.
Yamin Yisrael	יד	Right-wing	Broke away from Moledet, another right-wing party, prior to the 1996 elections, but failed to cross the electoral threshold.
The Arab List - The Center	צח	Centre	Arab satellite list that ran in the 1955 elections. Affiliated with General Zionists

=== Family tree of parties in Israel ===
Left-wing and Labor Zionist
- Hapoel Hatzair	Poale Zion	Hashomer Hatzair
  Ahdut HaAvoda	Poale Zion Left
  Palestine Communist Party
  Mapai	Hashomer Hatzair Workers Party	Maki
  Ahdut HaAvoda
  Mapam
  Rafi	Ahdut HaAvoda	Left Faction
  Israeli Labor Party	Ratz	Moked	Meri
  Sheli
  Meretz
  One Nation	Shahar
  Israel Democratic Party
  The Democrats
  The main predecessors of The Democrats except Shinui which left Meretz.

Secular right and centre
- Yemenite Association	Sephardim and Oriental Communities	General Zionists	HaOved HaTzioni	New Aliyah Party	Hatzohar
  Progressive Party	Herut
  Yemenite Faction
  Israeli Liberal Party
  Independent Liberals	Gahal
  National List	Free Centre	Movement for Greater Israel
  Shinui	Shlomtzion	Likud	Movement for the Renewal of Social Zionism	Flatto-Sharon
  Dash	Tehiya	Ometz
  Shinui	Tzomet
  Center Movement
  New Liberal Party	Yisrael BaAliyah	Gesher	Third Way
  Yisrael Beiteinu	Center Party
  Hetz	Kadima
  Yesh Atid	Hatnua
  Kulanu	Zehut
  Israel Resilience Party	Gesher
  New Hope
  Also includes the General Zionist ancestors of Likud.

Religious Zionist
- Mizrachi	Hapoel HaMizrachi
  Mafdal
  Tami	Kach
  Meimad	Moledet
  Tkuma	Yamin Yisrael	Herut
  Ahi	Hayil
  The Jewish Home	Hatikva	Eretz Yisrael Shelanu
  National Union–Tkuma	Otzma Yehudit	Yachad
  New Right	Noam
  Yamina	Religious Zionist Party
  The main predecessors of the Religious Zionist Party. It only shows the periods where each party was active as an independent movement and not as shelf parties.

== Zionist youth movements ==
Name	Meaning	Movement	Association	Notes
Betar	League of Joseph Trumpeldor	Revisionist	Likud	Historically associated with Herut, and now Likud.
Bnei Akiva	Sons of Akiva	Religious	The Jewish Home	Historically associated with Mafdal, and now The Jewish Home.
Habonim Dror	The Builders of Freedom	Labor	Labor Party	Associated with the Labor Zionism and the United Kibbutz Movement, and unofficially with the Israeli Labor Party.
Hashomer Hatzair	The Young Guard	Labor	Meretz	Associated with the left faction of Labor Zionism, historically associated with Mapam and the Kibbutz Artzi movement, and unofficially with Meretz.
HaNoar HaOved VeHaLomed	The Working and Learning Youth	Labor	Labor Party	Associated with the Labor Zionist movement, Histadrut, and unofficially with the Israeli Labor Party.
Meretz Youth	Meretz Youth	Labor	Meretz	Youth wing of Meretz (under 18), now associated with The Democrats
Noar HaAvoda	Labor Youth	Labor	Labor Party	Young-wing of the Israeli Labor Party (under 18), now associated with The Democrats.
Noar HaIhud HaLeumi	National Union Youth	Religious	Religious Zionist	Youth wing of the Religious Zionist Party.
Noar HaGvaot	Hilltop Youth	Religious	Otzma Yehudit	Historically associated with Kach, and its various successor parties.
Noar Yesh Atid	Yesh Atid Youth	Liberal	Yesh Atid	Youth wing of Yesh Atid (under 18).
HaMahanot HaOlim	The Immigrants Camps	Labor	None	Associated with the Labor Zionist movement.
HaNoar HaTzioni	The Zionist Youth	Liberal	None	Historically associated with the General Zionists.
Ariel	Lion of God	Religious	Religious Zionist	Split from Bnei Akiva, unofficially associated with Religious Zionist Party.
HaNoar HaDati HaOved VeHaLomed	The Religious Working and Studying Youth	Religious	None	Founded in 1952, historically associated with Hapoel HaMizrachi.
Noar HaLikud	The Likud Youth	Revisionist	Likud	Youth wing of Likud (under 18).
Young Meretz	Young Meretz	Labor	Meretz	Young-wing of Meretz (18-35).

== See also ==
- Politics of Israel
- List of political parties by country
- Liberalism in Israel
- Labor Zionism
- Revisionist Zionism
