= List of prime ministers of Israel =

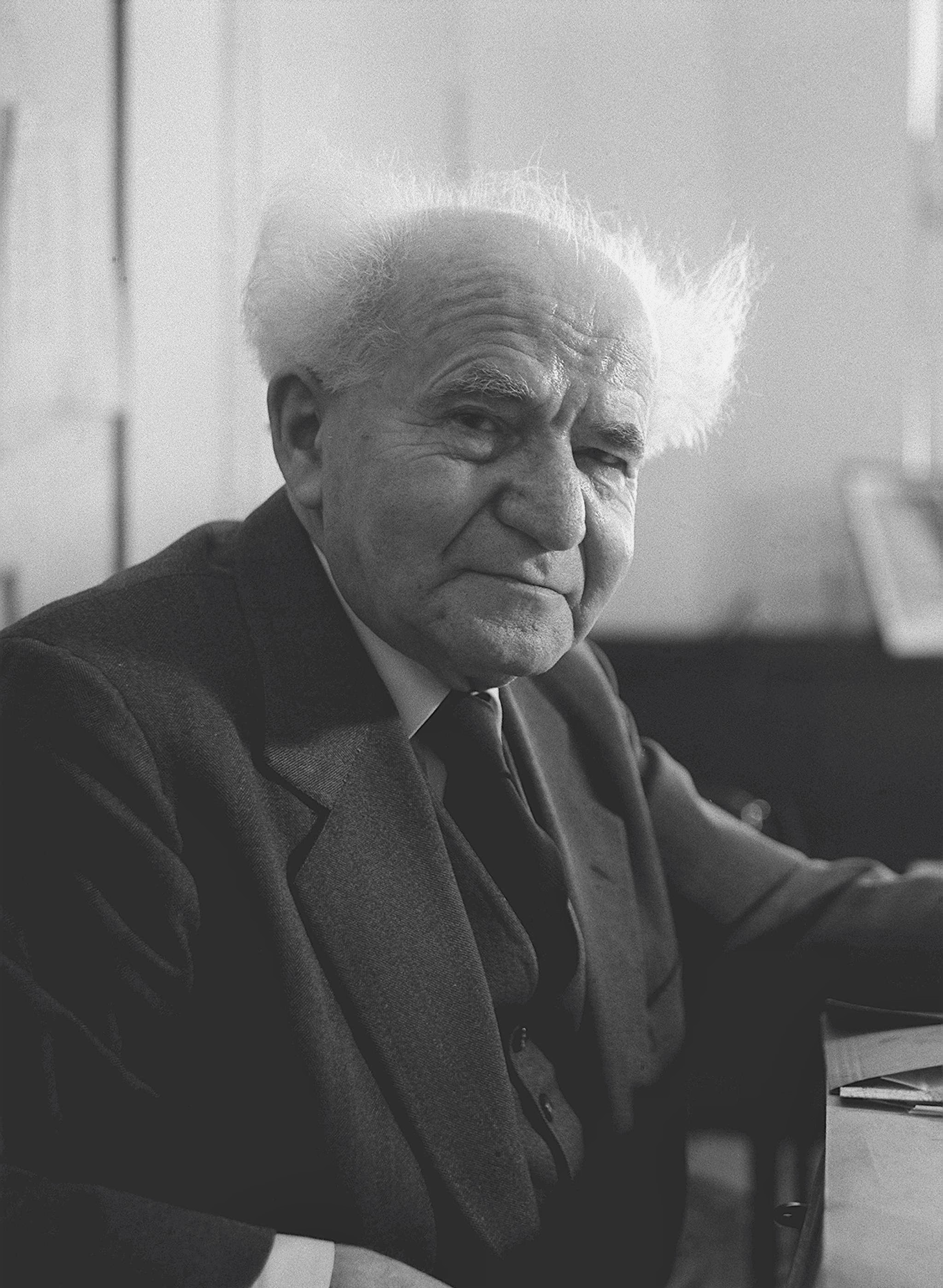
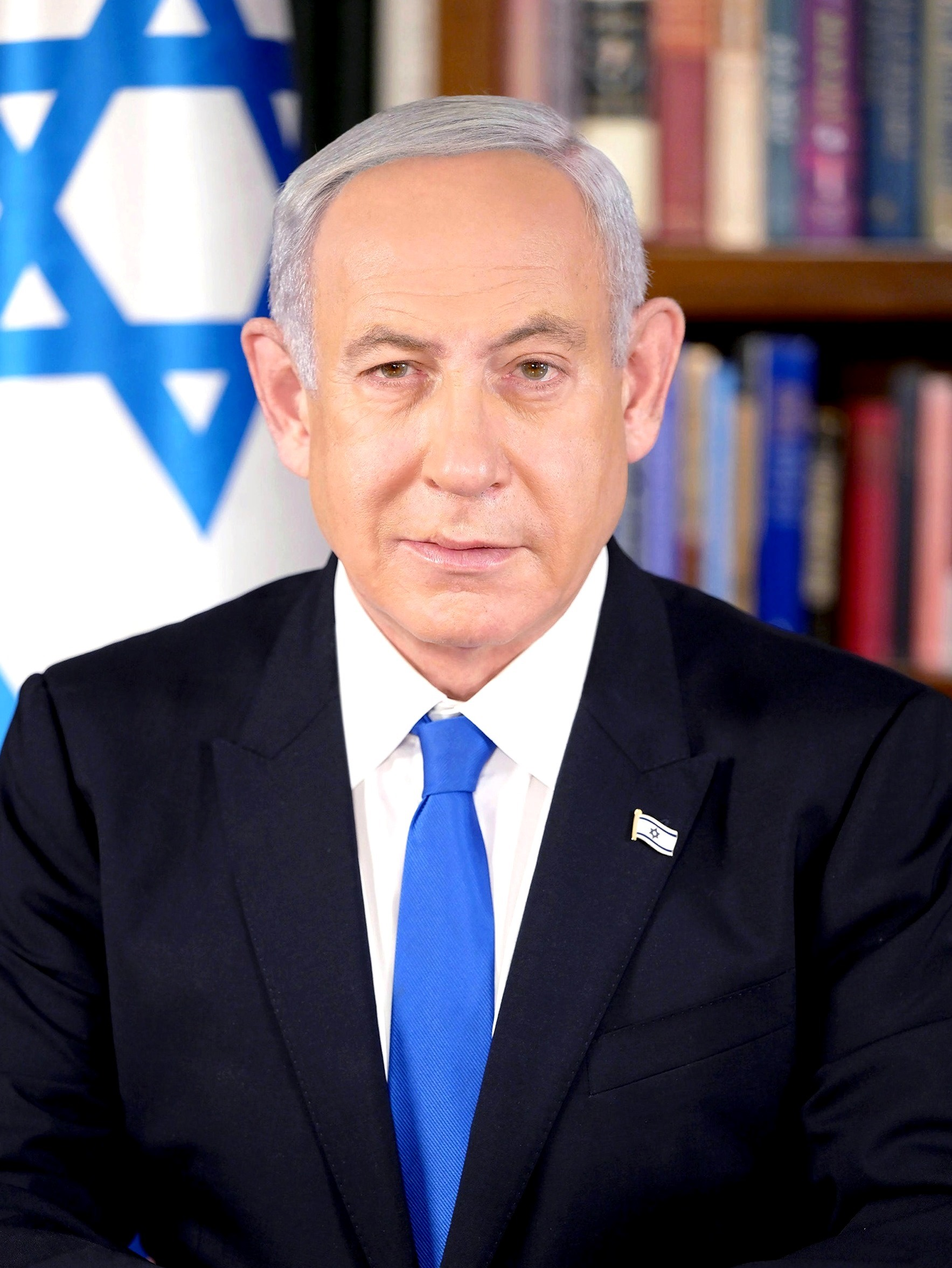
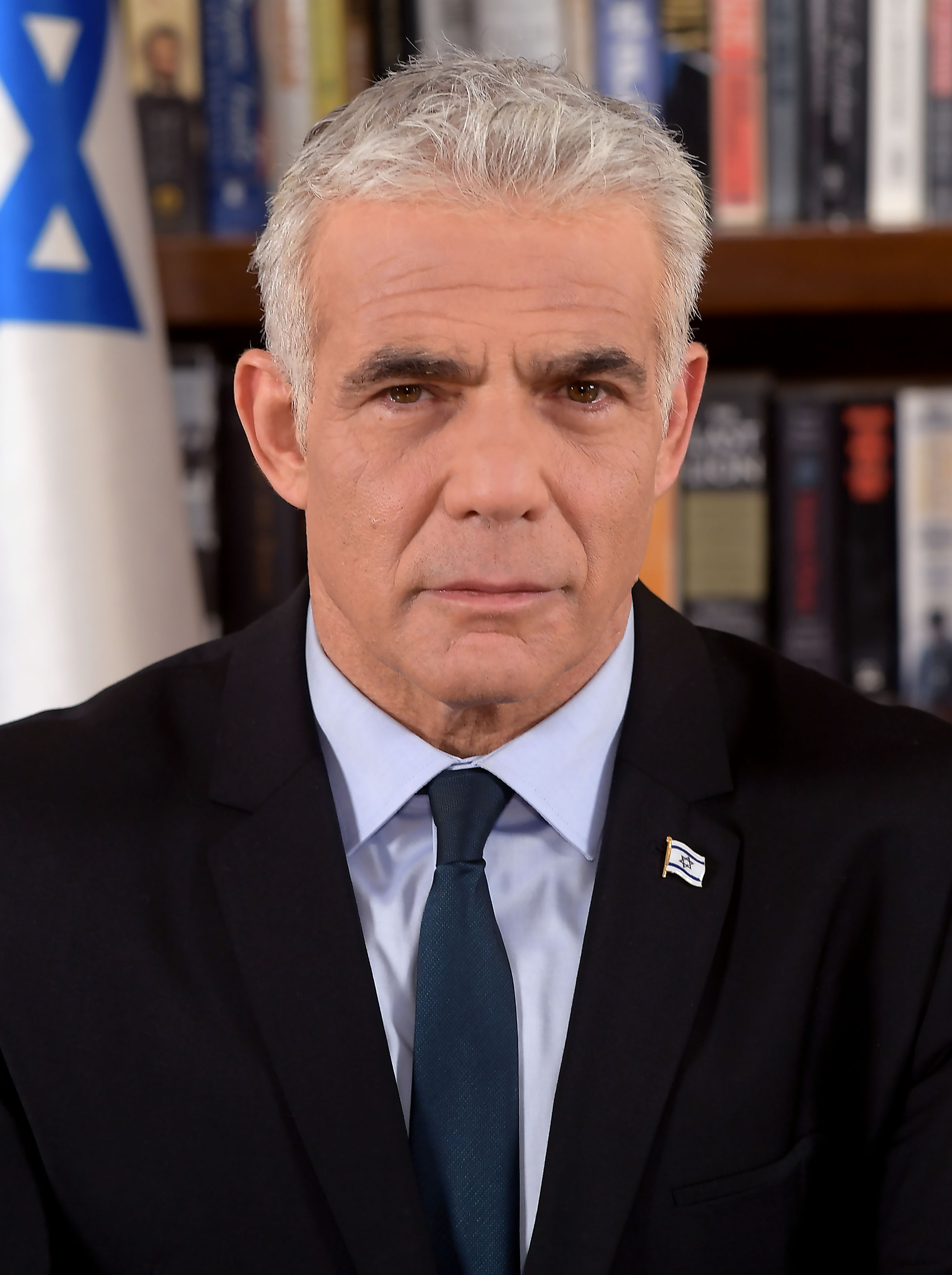
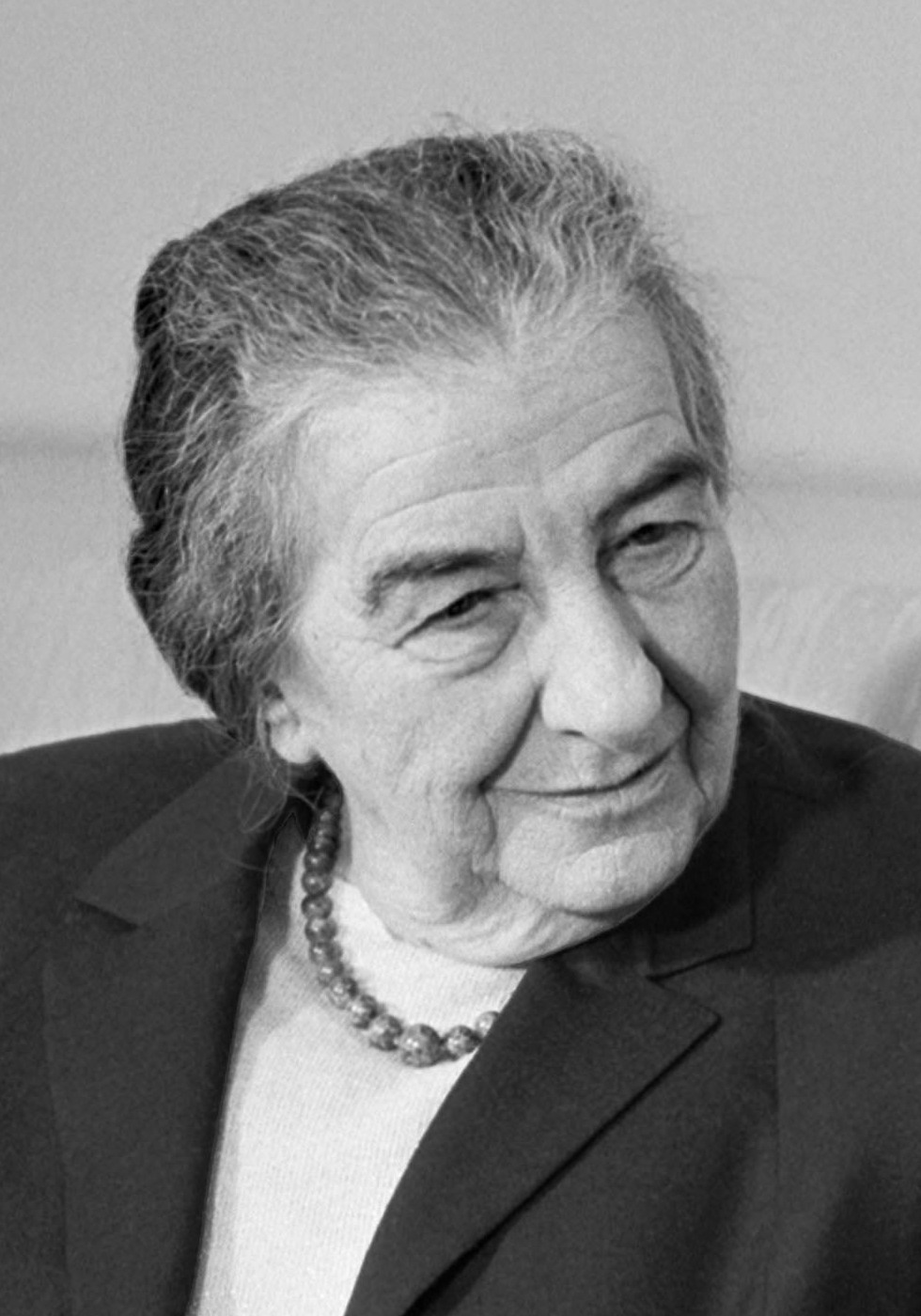
- David Ben-Gurion (top left) was the first prime minister of Israel.
- Benjamin Netanyahu (top right) is the longest-serving and incumbent prime minister, as well as the first Israeli prime minister to be born in the State of Israel after its independence.
- Yair Lapid (bottom left) is considered the shortest-serving prime minister; however, if acting prime ministers are counted, that title goes to Yigal Allon.
- Golda Meir (bottom right) was the first female prime minister of Israel.

The prime minister of Israel is the head of government and chief executive of the State of Israel. The incumbent prime minister of Israel is Benjamin Netanyahu, who assumed office on 29 December 2022. He also held the office from 1996 to 1999 and from 2009 to 2021. Having served for more than 18 years, Netanyahu is the longest-serving prime minister in the history of Israel.

Since the adoption of the Israeli Declaration of Independence in 1948, 14 people have served as the prime minister of Israel, five of whom have served on two or three non-consecutive occasions. Additionally, one person, Yigal Allon, has served solely as an acting prime minister. The other two who have served as acting prime minister have gone on to become the prime minister. Of these individuals, Golda Meir (prime minister from 1969–74) is the only woman to have served in the office.

== Prime ministers of Israel (1948–present) ==
Legend:

Mapai/Alignment/Labor (7)
Herut/Likud (4)
Kadima (2)
Yamina (1)
Yesh Atid (1)

No.	Portrait	Name (Birth–Death)	Term of office			Political party	Elected (Knesset)		Government	
No.	Portrait	Name (Birth–Death)	Took office	Left office	Time in office	Political party	Elected (Knesset)		No.	Composition
1		David Ben-Gurion (1886–1973)	14 May 1948	10 March 1949	5 years, 207 days	Mapai	—		Prov.	Mapai • Mapam • HHaM • New Aliyah • S&O • Mizrachi • Gen.Zionists • Aguda
1		David Ben-Gurion (1886–1973)	10 March 1949	1 November 1950	5 years, 207 days	Mapai	1949 (1st)		1st	Mapai • URF • Progressives • S&O • DLN
1		David Ben-Gurion (1886–1973)	1 November 1950	8 October 1951	5 years, 207 days	Mapai	1949 (1st)		2nd	Mapai • URF • Progressives • S&O • DLN
1		David Ben-Gurion (1886–1973)	8 October 1951	24 December 1952	5 years, 207 days	Mapai	1951 (2nd)		3rd	Mapai • Mizrachi • HHaM-Aguda-PAY • DLIA-P&W-A&D
1		David Ben-Gurion (1886–1973)	24 December 1952	7 December 1953	5 years, 207 days	Mapai	1951 (2nd)		4th	Mapai • Gen.Zionists • Progressive • Mizrachi • HHaM • DLIA-P&W-A&D
—		Moshe Sharett (1894–1965)	7 December 1953	26 January 1954	50 days	Mapai	1951 (2nd)		4th	Mapai • Gen.Zionists • Progressive • Mizrachi • HHaM • DLIA-P&W-A&D
2		Moshe Sharett (1894–1965)	26 January 1954	29 June 1955	1 year, 281 days	Mapai	1951 (2nd)		5th	Mapai • Gen.Zionists • Progressive • Mizrachi • HHaM • DLIA-P&W-A&D
2		Moshe Sharett (1894–1965)	29 June 1955	3 November 1955	1 year, 281 days	Mapai	1951 (2nd)		6th	Mapai • Mizrachi • HHaM • DLIA-P&W-A&D
(1)		David Ben-Gurion (1886–1973)	3 November 1955	7 January 1958	7 years, 235 days	Mapai	1955 (3rd)		7th	Mapai • NRP • Mapam • AHaA • Progressives • DLIA-P&W-A&D • P&D-C&B (Note: Progress and Development and Cooperation and Brotherhood, two new parties, were members of the 9th government, which was otherwise identical in composition to the 7th and 8th governments.)
(1)		David Ben-Gurion (1886–1973)	7 January 1958	17 December 1959	7 years, 235 days	Mapai	1955 (3rd)		8th	Mapai • NRP • Mapam • AHaA • Progressives • DLIA-P&W-A&D • P&D-C&B
(1)		David Ben-Gurion (1886–1973)	17 December 1959	2 November 1961	7 years, 235 days	Mapai	1959 (4th)		9th	Mapai • NRP • Mapam • AHaA • Progressives • DLIA-P&W-A&D • P&D-C&B
(1)		David Ben-Gurion (1886–1973)	2 November 1961	26 June 1963	7 years, 235 days	Mapai	1961 (5th)		10th	Mapai • NRP • AHaA • PAY • P&D-C&B
3		Levi Eshkol (1895–1969)	26 June 1963	22 December 1964	5 years, 245 days	Mapai	1961 (5th)		11th	Mapai • NRP • AHaA • PAY • P&D-C&B
3		Levi Eshkol (1895–1969)	22 December 1964	12 January 1966	5 years, 245 days	Mapai	1961 (5th)		12th	Mapai • NRP • AHaA • PAY • P&D-C&B
3		Levi Eshkol (1895–1969)	12 January 1966	26 February 1969 (Note: Levi Eshkol died while in office. Yigal Allon briefly served as interim prime minister until he was replaced by Golda Meir.)	5 years, 245 days	Mapai/Labor; Alignment (Note: For the 1965 elections, Mapai allied with Ahdut HaAvoda to form the Labor Alignment, later renamed Alignment. This first Alignment ended when Mapai, Ahdut HaAvoda and Rafi merged to form the Labor Party on 23 January 1968. On 28 January 1969, Labor formed a second Alignment in alliance with Mapam.)	1965 (6th)		13th	Alignment • NRP • Mapam • Indep.Liberals • PAY • P&D-C&B • Gahal (Note: Gahal and Rafi joined on 5 June 1967. Rafi merged into Labor (a member of the Alignment) on 23 January 1968.) • Rafi
—		Yigal Allon (1918–1980); Interim	26 February 1969	17 March 1969	19 days	Labor; Alignment	1965 (6th)		13th	Alignment • NRP • Mapam • Indep.Liberals • PAY • P&D-C&B • Gahal • Rafi
4		Golda Meir (1898–1978)	17 March 1969	15 December 1969	5 years, 78 days	Labor; Alignment	1965 (6th)		14th	Alignment • NRP • Mapam • Indep.Liberals • PAY • P&D-C&B • Gahal • Rafi
4		Golda Meir (1898–1978)	15 December 1969	10 March 1974	5 years, 78 days	Labor; Alignment	1969 (7th)		15th	Alignment • Gahal (Note: Gahal stood down from the government on 6 August 1970.) • NRP • Indep.Liberals • P&D-C&B
4		Golda Meir (1898–1978)	10 March 1974	3 June 1974	5 years, 78 days	Labor; Alignment	1973 (8th)		16th	Alignment • NRP • Indep.Liberals
5		Yitzhak Rabin (1922–1995)	3 June 1974	21 June 1977 (Note: Yitzhak Rabin resigned and called for early elections in December 1976. After he was re-elected as the Alignment's leader, he resigned as candidate for the upcoming elections on 7 April 1977, but legally remained prime minister until Begin's first government was formed. However, Shimon Peres unofficially served as acting prime minister from 22 April 1977 until 21 June 1977.)	3 years, 17 days	Labor; Alignment	1973 (8th)		17th	Alignment • Indep.Liberals • Ratz (Note: National Religious Party joined the government on 30 October 1970.) • NRP (Note: Ratz stood down from the government on 6 November 1970.)
6		Menachem Begin (1913–1992)	21 June 1977	5 August 1981	6 years, 112 days	Herut; Likud (Note: Until 1988, Likud was simply an electoral alliance between Herut and the Liberal Party, much like Alignment. A single united Likud party was only established in 1988.)	1977 (9th)		18th	Likud • NRP • Aguda • Dash (Note: Democratic Movement for Change joined the government in October 1977.)
6		Menachem Begin (1913–1992)	5 August 1981	10 October 1983	6 years, 112 days	Herut; Likud	1981 (10th)		19th	Likud • NRP • Aguda • Tami • Telem/MRSZ (Note: The Movement for the Renewal of Social Zionism was formed 6 June 1983 following the break-up of Telem.) • Tehiya (Note: Tehiya joined the government on 26 August 1981)
7		Yitzhak Shamir (1915–2012)	10 October 1983	13 September 1984	339 days	Herut; Likud	1981 (10th)		20th	Likud • NRP • Aguda • Tami • Telem/MRSZ • Tehiya
8		Shimon Peres (1923–2016)	13 September 1984 (Note: After the 1984 elections, Likud and the Alignment reached a coalition agreement by which the role of prime minister would be rotated mid-term between them. Shimon Peres of the Alignment served as prime minister for the first two years, and then the role was passed to Yitzhak Shamir. After the 1988 election Likud was able to govern without the Alignment, and Yitzhak Shamir continued as prime minister.)	20 October 1986	2 years, 37 days	Labor; Alignment	1984 (11th)		21st	Alignment • Likud • NRP • Aguda • Shas • Morasha (Note: Morasha was not included in the 22nd government, which was otherwise identical in composition to the 21st government.) • Shinui • Ometz
(7)		Yitzhak Shamir (1915–2012)	20 October 1986	22 December 1988	5 years, 267 days	Herut; Likud	1984 (11th)		22nd	Alignment • Likud • NRP • Aguda • Shas • Morasha • Shinui • Ometz
(7)		Yitzhak Shamir (1915–2012)	22 December 1988	11 June 1990	5 years, 267 days	Likud	1988 (12th)		23rd	Likud • Alignment • NRP • Shas • Aguda • Degel HaTorah
(7)		Yitzhak Shamir (1915–2012)	11 June 1990	13 July 1992	5 years, 267 days	Likud	1988 (12th)		24th	Likud • NRP • Shas • Aguda • Degel HaTorah • New Liberal • Tehiya • Tzomet • Moledet • UPI • Geula
(5)		Yitzhak Rabin (1922–1995)	13 July 1992	4 November 1995 (Note: Rabin was assassinated while in office. Shimon Peres served as interim prime minister until 22 November 1995.)	3 years, 114 days	Labor	1992 (13th)		25th	Labor • Meretz • Shas (Note: Shas stood down from the government on 14 September 1993) • Yiud (Note: Yiud joined on 9 January 1995.)
—		Shimon Peres (1923–2016)	4 November 1995	22 November 1995	18 days	Labor	1992 (13th)		26th	Labor • Meretz • Shas • Yiud
(8)		Shimon Peres (1923–2016)	22 November 1995	18 June 1996	209 days	Labor	1992 (13th)		26th	Labor • Meretz • Shas • Yiud
9		Benjamin Netanyahu (born 1949)	18 June 1996	6 July 1999	3 years, 18 days	Likud	1996 (14th)		27th	Likud-Gesher-Tzomet • Shas • NRP • BaAliyah • UTJ • Third Way
10		Ehud Barak (born 1942)	6 July 1999	7 March 2001	1 year, 244 days	Labor; One Israel	1999	(15th)	28th	One Israel • Shas • Meretz • BaAliyah • Centre • NRP • UTJ (Note: United Torah Judaism stood down from government in September 1999.)
11		Ariel Sharon (1928–2014)	7 March 2001	28 February 2003	4 years, 303 days	Likud	2001	(15th)	29th	Likud • Labor-Meimad (Note: Labor-Meimad left government on 2 November 2002.) • Shas (Note: Shas left government on 23 May 2002, before returning on 3 June 2002.) • Centre • NRP • UTJ • BaAliyah • NU-Beiteinu • New Way • Gesher
11		Ariel Sharon (1928–2014)	28 February 2003	21 November 2005 (Note: On 21 November 2005, Prime Minister Ariel Sharon, along with several other ministers and MKs, split from Likud over the issue of disengagement from the Gaza Strip and negotiations over the final status of the West Bank. Sharon formed a new party, Kadima, which would go on to compete in the following elections of March 2006. Sharon continued as prime minister.)	4 years, 303 days	Likud	2003 (16th)		30th	Likud • Shinui (Note: Shinui left government on 4 December 2004) • NU (Note: National Union left government on 6 June 2004) • NRP (Note: National Religious Party joined the government on 3 March 2003, before leaving on 11 November 2004) • Labor-Meimad (Note: Labor-Meimad joined the government on 10 January 2005, before leaving on 23 November 2005) • Aguda (Note: Agudat Yisrael joined the government on 30 March 2005)
11		Ariel Sharon (1928–2014)	21 November 2005	(4 January 2006) (Note: As the result of Ariel Sharon suffering a severe stroke on 4 January 2006, and being put under general anesthetic, Ehud Olmert served as the Acting Prime Minister (Hebrew: ממלא מקום ראש הממשלה בפועל) from 4 January to 14 April, according to Basic Law: The Government: "Should the Prime Minister be temporarily unable to discharge his duties, his place will be filled by the Acting Prime Minister. After the passage of 100 days upon which the Prime Minister does not resume his duties, the Prime Minister will be deemed permanently unable to exercise his office." Basic Law: the Government 2001, section 16b In Sharon's case, this occurred on 14 April 2006, upon which Olmert became interim prime minister for the remainder of the 30th government, finally becoming full prime minister on the formation of the 31st government.); 14 April 2006	4 years, 303 days	Kadima	2003 (16th)		30th	Kadima (Note: Kadima broke away from Likud on 23 November 2005, leaving a government consisting of Kadima, Likud and Agudat Yisrael) • Likud (Note: Likud left government on 15 January 2006.) • Aguda
—		Ehud Olmert (born 1945)	4 January 2006	14 April 2006	100 days	Kadima	2003 (16th)		30th	Kadima • Likud • Aguda
—		Ehud Olmert (born 1945)	14 April 2006	4 May 2006	20 days	Kadima	2003 (16th)		30th	Kadima • Likud • Aguda
12		Ehud Olmert (born 1945)	4 May 2006	31 March 2009 (Note: Olmert officially resigned on 21 September 2008. With this, his cabinet became an interim government, and he was Interim Prime Minister until the establishment of a new governing coalition (he was officially the Prime Minister, however, the government under him was an interim government, in this case).)	2 years, 331 days	Kadima	2006 (17th)		31st	Kadima • Labor • Shas • Gil • Beiteinu (Note: Yisrael Beiteinu joined the government in November 2006, before leaving on 16 January 2008.)
(9)		Benjamin Netanyahu (born 1949)	31 March 2009	18 March 2013	10 years, 9 days	Likud	2009 (18th)		32nd	Likud • Beiteinu • Shas • Labor/Indep. (Note: Independence broke away from Labor on 17 January 2011; Independence remained in the government and Labor stood down.) • Jewish Home • UTJ (Note: United Torah Judaism joined the government on 1 April 2009)
(9)		Benjamin Netanyahu (born 1949)	18 March 2013	6 May 2015	10 years, 9 days	Likud	2013 (19th)		33rd	Likud • Yesh Atid • The Jewish Home • Yisrael Beiteinu • Hatnuah
(9)		Benjamin Netanyahu (born 1949)	6 May 2015	9 April 2019	10 years, 9 days	Likud	2015 (20th)		34th	Likud • Kulanu (Note: Kulanu merged into Likud on 31 July 2019) • The Jewish Home (Note: New Right split from The Jewish Home on 29 December 2018 and remained in government until 2 June 2019, returning on 8 November 2019) (Note: The Jewish Home merged with Tkuma and Otzma Yehudit on 21 February 2019 to become the Union of Right-Wing Parties) (Note: On 15 January 2020, New Right and URWP merged to become Yamina.) • Shas • UTJ • Yisrael Beiteinu (Note: Yisrael Beiteinu joined the government on 30 May 2016, before leaving on 18 November 2018)
—		Benjamin Netanyahu (born 1949)	9 April 2019	17 May 2020	1 year, 38 days	Likud	Apr. 2019 (21st)		34th	Likud • Kulanu • The Jewish Home • Shas • UTJ • Yisrael Beiteinu
—		Benjamin Netanyahu (born 1949)	9 April 2019	17 May 2020	1 year, 38 days	Likud	Sep. 2019 (22nd)		34th	Likud • Kulanu • The Jewish Home • Shas • UTJ • Yisrael Beiteinu
(9)		Benjamin Netanyahu (born 1949)	17 May 2020	13 June 2021	1 year, 27 days	Likud	2020 (23rd)		35th	Likud • Blue and White • Shas • UTJ • Labor (Note: Of the three Labor MKs, one (Merav Michaeli) sat in opposition) • Derekh Eretz (Note: Derekh Eretz left the government on 16 December 2020.) • Gesher • The Jewish Home
13		Naftali Bennett (born 1972)	13 June 2021	30 June 2022 (Note: Under the coalition agreement establishing the thirty-sixth government of Israel, Naftali Bennett's tenure as prime minister concluded at the end of 30 June 2022 and Yair Lapid took office at the beginning of 1 July 2022.)	1 year, 17 days	New Right; Yamina	2021 (24th)		36th	Yesh Atid • Blue and White • Yamina • Labor • Yisrael Beiteinu • New Hope • Meretz • United Arab List
14		Yair Lapid (born 1963)	1 July 2022	29 December 2022	181 days	Yesh Atid	2021 (24th)		36th	Yesh Atid • Blue and White • Yamina • Labor • Yisrael Beiteinu • New Hope • Meretz • United Arab List
(9)		Benjamin Netanyahu (born 1949)	29 December 2022	Incumbent	3 years, 315 days	Likud	2022 (25th)		37th	Likud • Shas (Note: Shas stood down from cabinet on 17 July 2025, but remained part of the parliamentary coalition.) • UTJ (Note: United Torah Judaism stood down from government on 15 July 2025) • Religious Zionism • Otzma Yehudit (Note: Otzma Yehudit stood down on 21 January 2025 and returned on 19 March 2025.) • Noam (Note: Noam stood down on 28 February 2023, returned on 25 May 2023, and stood down again on 24 March 2025.) • National Unity (Note: National Unity joined the government on 12 October 2023 and stood down on 9 June 2024.) • New Hope (Note: New Hope split from National Unity on 13 March 2024, stood down from the government on 25 March, and returned on 29 September 2024.)

== Tenure of office in years ==
=== List of prime ministers by tenure ===
As of 2026, there have been fourteen individuals to serve as prime minister of Israel across twenty one occasions and thirty seven distinct governments. Of these, Benjamin Netanyahu served the most periods (three: 1996–1999; 2009–2021; 2022 onwards), whilst Yigal Allon served solely as an acting prime minister in 1969. Golda Meir (1969–74) is the only woman to have served in the office.

The following is a list of prime ministers by total time in office:

1. Benjamin Netanyahu: 19 years, 42 days as of 9 November 2026 (first tenure: 3 years and 18 days; second tenure: 12 years and 74 days; third tenure: 3 years, 315 days)
2. David Ben-Gurion: 13 years and 127 days (first tenure: 5 years and 257 days; second tenure: 7 years and 235 days)
3. Yitzhak Shamir: 6 years and 242 days (first tenure: 339 days; second tenure: 5 years and 268 days)
4. Yitzhak Rabin: 6 years and 132 days (first tenure: 3 years and 18 days; (Note: Rabin's first tenure includes a period of 60 days at the end wherein Rabin had stepped aside and Peres was the de facto prime minister. Due to the government being a caretaker government and laws preventing caretaker prime ministers from resigning, Rabin remained prime minister de jure during the period.) second tenure: 3 years and 114 days)
5. Menachem Begin: 6 years and 113 days
6. Levi Eshkol: 5 years and 247 days
7. Ariel Sharon: 5 years and 39 days (Note: Sharon's premiership includes a period of 100 days of "temporary incapacitation" wherein Sharon retained the title of Prime Minister, but the authorities of the office were delegated to the Designated Acting Prime Minister)
8. Golda Meir: 5 years and 19 days
9. Ehud Olmert: 2 years and 351 days (Note: Olmert's premiership excludes a period of 100 days wherein Olmert was given the authority of the Prime Minister, in his capacity as the Acting Prime Minister, while the serving prime minister was "temporarily incapacitated")
10. Shimon Peres: 2 years and 264 days (Note: Peres' premiership excludes a period of 60 days in 1977 wherein Peres was heading a caretaker government as de facto prime minister. Due to laws preventing a caretaker prime minister from resigning, Yitzhak Rabin was still the prime minister de jure despite surrendering his duties to Peres.) (first tenure: 2 years and 37 days; second tenure: 227 days) (Note: Peres' second tenure includes a period of 18 days in November 1995 wherein he was the acting prime minister of the twenty-fifth government (the interim period between the assassination of Rabin and the formation of the twenty-sixth government))
11. Moshe Sharett: 1 year and 281 days
12. Ehud Barak: 1 year and 245 days
13. Naftali Bennett: 1 year and 17 days
14. Yair Lapid: 181 days
15. Yigal Allon: 19 days (acting)

=== Timeline of prime ministers ===
This is a graphical lifespan timeline of prime ministers of Israel. The prime ministers are listed in order of office, with prime ministers who held the office more than once listed in order of their first term.

== See also ==
- List of Jewish leaders in the Land of Israel
- List of presidents of Israel
- List of prime ministers of Israel by place of birth
- Prime Minister of Israel
