= David Petel =

Israeli politician (1921–2019)

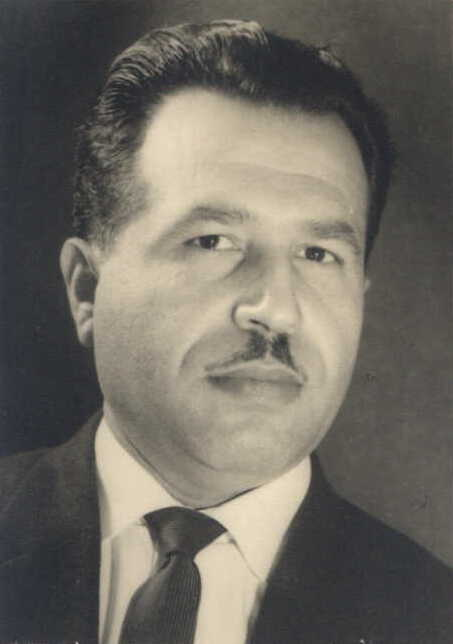
- Petel during his time in the Knesset

Faction represented in the Knesset
- 1959–1965: Mapai
- 1965–1968: Alignment
- 1968–1969: Labor Party
- 1969: Alignment

Personal details
- Born: 6 September 1921 Basra, Iraq
- Died: 6 October 2019 (aged 98)

David Petel (Hebrew: דוד פתל; 6 September 1921 – 6 October 2019) was an Israeli politician who served as a member of the Knesset for Mapai and its successors from 1959 until 1969.

== Biography ==
Born in Basra in Iraq, Petel emigrated to Mandatory Palestine in 1941, and later became chairman of the Iraqi Immigrants Association.

A member of Mapai, he was elected to Bnei Brak city council, and in 1959 was elected to the Knesset on the Mapai list. He was re-elected in 1961 and 1965, by which time Mapai had formed the Alignment alliance. He lost his seat in the 1969 elections. In 1974 he became a member of the Histadrut's Co-ordinating Committee.
