= Arab satellite lists =

Israeli Arab party voting lists

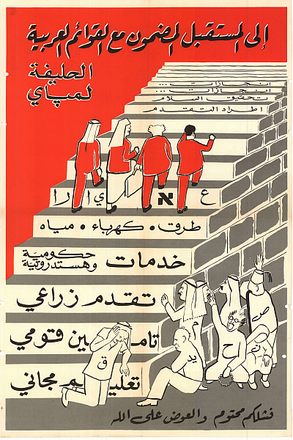
Election poster of Mapai, urging Arabs to vote for its allied lists. The main slogan reads "Towards a guaranteed future with the Arab lists, allied with Mapai."

The Arab satellite lists (Hebrew: מפלגות הלוויין הערביות), Arab lists (Arabic: القوائم العربية) or minority lists, were satellite parties in Israel formed for the purposes of gaining electoral support from the Arab population for Mapai (and later the Labor Party), and other Zionist parties between 1948 and the mid-1970s. Between the 1949 elections and the 1969 elections, most of the Israeli Arab vote was divided between the communist parties Maki and Rakah (Note: Rakah was an Arab-dominated breakaway from Maki in 1965 and was then recognised by the Soviet Union as the official communist party) and the Arab satellite lists. The time span under military rule (1948–1966) was described as the "golden age" of satellite parties. According to Israeli scholar Rebecca Kook, Maki and Rakah were considered the only parties to truly represent Arab interests until the Progressive List for Peace won two seats in the 1984 elections.

The existence of the Arab lists was partially because Arabs were barred from membership of Mapai until 1973. Unlike normal political parties, they were not active between elections. Most of the lists survived more than one term, and all were subservient to the policies of their patron Mapai. The lists were put together based on local influence, clans and religion; and consisted of local politicians and clan leaders.

According to Ilana Kaufman, the Arab lists; "were not proper parties but ad hoc electoral arrangements for the election of Arabs to the Knesset." Majid Al Haj writes that the object of the lists "was not the political mobilization of the Arab populations but rather the capture of Arab votes."

The Labor Party withdrew its support from its last satellite list, the United Arab List, prior to the 1981 elections. The Alignment, an alliance of the Labor Party and Mapam, saw its share of the Arab vote triple in the elections, whilst the UAL failed to cross the electoral threshold. Alongside the defeat of two other lists, the Christian-led Arab Brotherhood List and the more radical Bedouin-led Arab Citizens' List, the election was seen as the end of personalist Arab lists based on traditional leadership. The Arab Democratic Party, established in 1988 as a breakaway from the Labor Party, effectively took their place in the political sphere but they took a more critical stance towards the Zionist parties compared to the satellite parties.

== List of Arab satellite lists ==
Party	Mother party	Aimed demographic	Elections, Time span
Agriculture and Development	Mapai	Little Triangle	1951-1959
Arab Brotherhood List	None	Christians	1981
Arab Citizens' List	None	Negev Bedouin	1981
Arab List for Bedouin and Villagers	Labor	Negev Bedouin	1973
Arab List – The Centre	General Zionists	–	1955
Arab Reform Movement	Ratz	Little Triangle and West Galilee	1977
Coexistence in Justice (Note: Also described as sympathetic to the Palestinian cause.)	None	Galilee	1977
Cooperation and Brotherhood	Mapai, Labor	Mount Carmel Muslims and Druze	1959-1969
Cooperation and Brotherhood	Labor dissident	Mount Carmel Muslims and Druze	1973
Cooperation and Development	Mapai	–	1966–1967
Democratic List for Israeli Arabs	Mapai	Galilee	1951, 1955
Democratic List of Nazareth	Mapai	Nazareth	1949
Independent Faction for Israeli Arabs	Mapai dissident (Note: Led by MK Masaad Kassis)	Greek Catholic	1959
Israeli Arab Labour Party	Ahdut HaAvoda	–	1959
Israeli Arab List	Likud	–	1973
Israeli Druze Faction	Mapai, Labor	Druze	1967–1969
Jewish–Arab Brotherhood	Labor	Christians	1968–1969
Peace List	Rafi	–	1965
Popular Arab Bloc	Mapam	–	1949
Progress and Development	Mapai, Labor	Galilee	1959-1973
Progress and Work	Mapai	Druze and West Galilee	1951, 1955
Progress and Work	Mapai dissident	Druze and West Galilee	1959
Progress and Work	Mafdal	Druze and West Galilee	1961
Supporters of Democracy	None	–	1961
United Arab List (Note: Fractured following the assassination of Bedouin sheikh Hamad Abu Rabia and in 1981 ran without support from its former patron.)	Labor	–	1977
United Arab List	Labor dissident	Nazareth Muslims and Druze (1981)	1981
Workers Bloc	Mapai	Acre, Haifa	1949

Usually, these lists signed vote-sharing agreements either with their patron or one another but all lists in 1951, and Progress and Work in 1961, did not sign an agreement, same with groups without a patron like the Independent Faction for Israeli Arabs and Progress and Work in 1959, and all lists in 1981.

Before the 1981 election, the Zionist parties like Alignment dropped their support for the satellite lists and none of them crossed the threshold. Arab Brotherhood List led by Haneh Hadad and Arab Citizens' List led by Nuri el-Okbi had previous ties to HaAvoda but el-Okbi ran a radical campaign to attract non-Bedouin Arabs and neither were sanctioned by them. Hadad later joined Alignment. Other parties also listed as Arab lists while lacking a patron are "Coexistence in Justice" (1977) and "Supporters of Democracy" (1961).

== Elections ==
election results of satellite lists and other Arab-led parties

The table below shows the votes of Arab-Israelis for Arab-led political parties, Jewish-led political parties and the satellite lists:

Year	Arab parties/Maki	Arab satellite lists	Jewish parties
1949	22%	52%	26%
1951	16%	55%	29%
1955	16%	58%	27%
1959	11%	59%	30%
1961	23%	46%	32%
1965	24%	44%	33%
1969	30%	41%	29%
1973	37%	36%	27%
1977	52%	21%	27%
1981	39%	12%	49%
1984	50%		50%
1988	58%		42%
1992	48%		52%
1996	62%		38%
1999	69%		31%
2003	69%		31%
2006	72%		28%
2009	82%		18%
2013	77%		23%
2015	83%		17%
April 2019	72%		28%
September 2019	82%		18%
2020	88%		12%
2021	80%		20%
2022	86%		14%
