= Military rule over Arabs in Israel =

Israeli military government over Arab citizens, 1948–1966

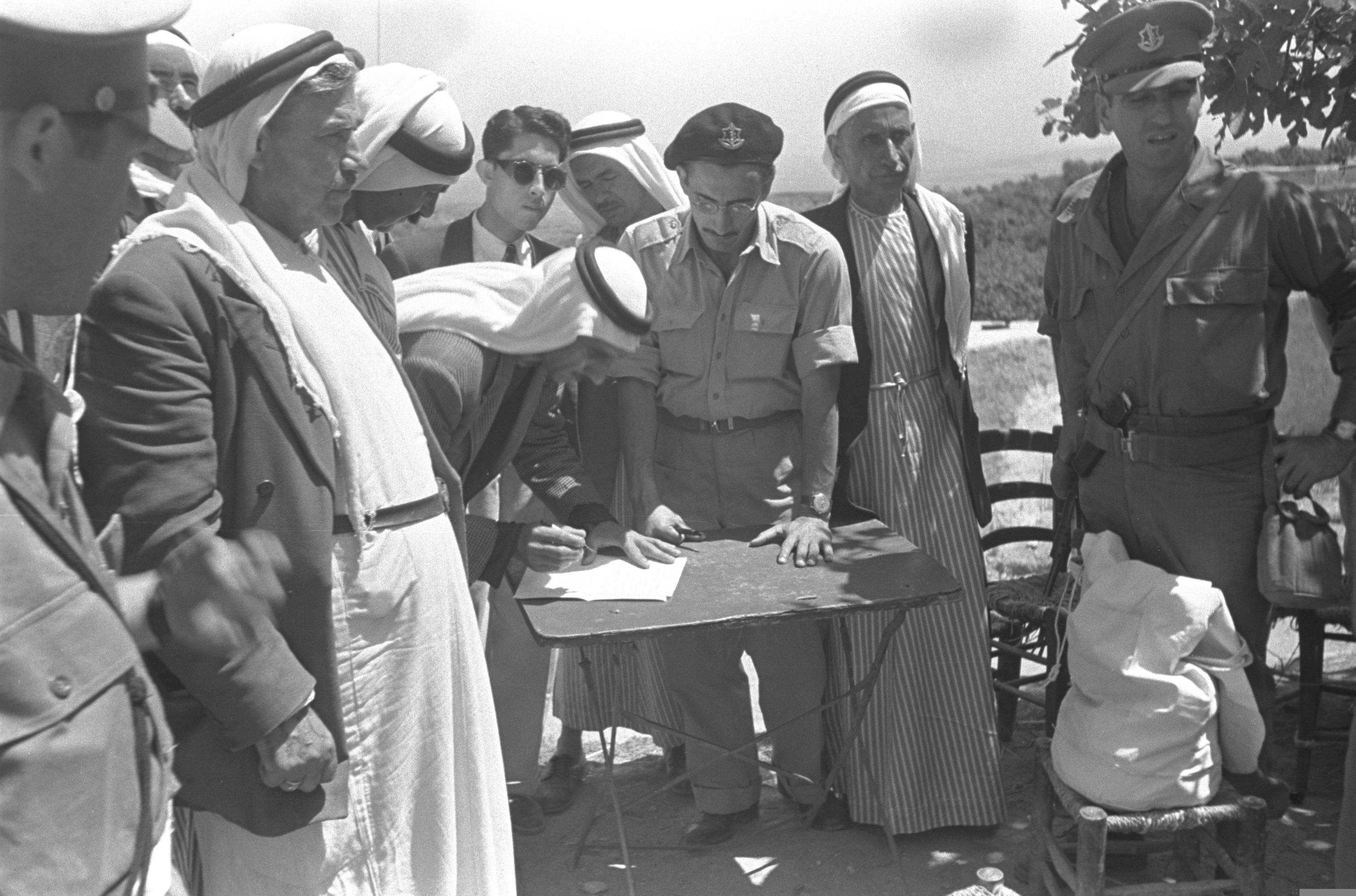
- The headman of Umm al-Fahm signs an oath of allegiance to Israel in the presence of military government officers when the village came under Israeli rule, 1949
- Native name: הממשל הצבאי על ערביי ישראל
- Date: 1948 – 1 December 1966 (residual restrictions until 1968)
- Location: Galilee, the Triangle, the Negev; Ramla, Lod, Jaffa and al-Majdal until 1949; Acre until 1951
- Cause: Defence (Emergency) Regulations, 1945
- Outcome: Military apparatus dismantled; powers transferred to the Israel Police, then to civilian ministries

The military rule over Arab citizens of Israel (Hebrew: הממשל הצבאי על ערביי ישראל, romanized: HaMimshal HaTzva'i al Arviyei Yisrael; Arabic: الحكم العسكري على العرب في إسرائيل, romanized: al-Hukm al-'Askari 'ala al-'Arab fi Isra'il), also known as the Military Government, was a system of military government that the State of Israel imposed on most of its Arab population from 1948 until its formal abolition on 1 December 1966. It was based on the Defence (Emergency) Regulations enacted by the British Mandate authorities in 1945, which Israel kept in force, and was applied to the Galilee, the Triangle and the Negev, and initially also to several mixed and coastal towns. About 156,000 Palestinian Arabs remained in Israeli territory after the 1948 war, and roughly 85 percent of them lived under the military government.

The military government restricted Arab citizens' freedom of movement, employment and political organisation through a permit regime, closed military zones, curfews, administrative detention and internal exile. Prime Minister David Ben-Gurion defended it throughout his tenure as a security necessity, while parties across the political spectrum, from Maki and Mapam on the left to Herut on the right, campaigned against it, particularly after the Kafr Qasim massacre of 1956. Restrictions were eased from 1959 onwards; Prime Minister Levi Eshkol announced the dismantling of the apparatus in 1966, although many of its powers passed to the police and emergency restrictions on Arab citizens were not fully lifted until 1968.

== Establishment and legal basis ==
Military government offices in Acre, 1950

Military rule existed in practice from early 1948, as Haganah forces took control of Arab localities under Plan Dalet. The central military government was formally declared by the Provisional government of Israel on 1 October 1948 and established on 21 October 1948. Its legal instrument was the Defence (Emergency) Regulations, which the British had enacted in 1945 against Jewish armed groups; at independence Israel kept Mandatory law in force, including these regulations. They empowered military governors to confiscate property, demolish buildings, deport residents, expropriate land and restrict movement without a permit. Regulation 125, which allowed a governor to declare an area closed and bar entry to it, was used to reduce the territory available to Arabs and to settle Jewish immigrants in abandoned Arab homes, particularly in depopulated towns.

Of the 162 regulations, five were central to the military government:

- Regulation 109 – prohibiting a person from being present in specified areas;
- Regulation 110 – placing a person under police supervision, including exile from their place of residence;
- Regulation 111 – administrative detention;
- Regulation 124 – imposing a curfew;
- Regulation 125 – declaring closed areas and restricting movement into and out of them.

The military government was divided into three regional commands, each under a military governor:

- Northern district – the Galilee, from the Lebanese border south to the Jezreel Valley and Nazareth, and west to Shefa-'Amr;
- Central district (the Triangle) – from the Megiddo area south along Wadi Ara to Kafr Qasim;
- Southern district – the Negev, between the Jordanian border and the Gaza Strip.

Formally, Jewish residents of these areas were also subject to the regulations, but in practice they were generally exempted from carrying permits, so the military government's main task was civilian control of the Arab population.

=== Coastal and mixed towns ===
Most Arab residents of the coastal towns were displaced in 1948, and those who remained were concentrated in designated neighbourhoods, informally called "ghettos". In Jaffa, about 400 Palestinians were concentrated in Ajami out of some 71,000 displaced from the city; in Lod, 600–800 remained out of 18,250; in Ramla, 150 out of 16,380; and in Haifa, about 3,200 were concentrated in Wadi Nisnas out of roughly 75,000 pre-war residents.

In March 1949 Ben-Gurion appointed a committee headed by the military government's commander, General Elimelech Avner, with the Negev governor Michael Hanegbi and Yehoshua Palmon of the Foreign Ministry. It recommended retaining military rule in the Galilee, al-Majdal, the Negev and the Triangle, and abolishing it in the mixed towns. Military rule ended in Jaffa, Ramla and Lod in July 1949 and in Acre in June 1951. The greater freedom enjoyed by Arabs in these towns was later cited by opponents as evidence that the system was unnecessary.

=== Administrative development ===
In July 1950 the military government headquarters was dissolved and its powers transferred to the generals of the regional commands; in September 1950 a military government department was established in the Ministry of Defence to coordinate government activity affecting Arab civilians. The Ministry of Minorities, initially responsible for Arab welfare, was abolished in 1949, leaving the military government and the Prime Minister's Adviser on Arab Affairs as almost the only state bodies dealing directly with Arab citizens. In 1955 responsibility moved from the Ministry of Defence to the Israel Defense Forces.

Although the government described the military government as an arm of the army, its commanders in practice took instructions from a "Central Security Committee" made up of the Adviser on Arab Affairs, the head of the police special duties unit, and the head of the Arab department of the Shin Bet. Military government officials kept extensive files on Arab citizens.

== Justifications and aims ==
Throughout his tenure Ben-Gurion advanced three main arguments for keeping military rule: that it was linked to the Arab–Israeli conflict; that the natural national identification of Arab citizens lay with enemy states, making them suspect as a fifth column; and that it formed part of the IDF, so that abolishing it could weaken Israel's deterrence. Senior officials also saw it as a tool for preventing the return of refugees and the reoccupation of abandoned villages, and for securing land designated for Jewish settlement in the Galilee and Negev. In testimony to the Rosen committee in 1959, the head of the military government department, Colonel Mishael Shaham, distinguished between "routine security" (preventing infiltration, closing training areas, monitoring movement) and "cumulative security" (preventing Arabs from taking hold of land planned for Jewish settlement). In 1958 the Mapai politician Meir Argov described the military government as also having a "Zionist purpose" of breaking up the Arab Galilee and settling it with Jews.

Historians and Palestinian scholars have additionally described it as a means of excluding Arab citizens from state institutions and of encouraging clan and sectarian identities at the expense of a shared national identity.

== Powers and practices ==
Military Police sign warning against entering military government territory south of Beersheba, 1950

Movement permits

Arab citizens needed permits to leave their localities – day and night until 1963, and at night only thereafter – under Regulation 125. Permits were sometimes granted in return for cooperation with the Shin Bet or willingness to work in poor conditions in Jewish localities. On Independence Day almost all Arab citizens were allowed to travel freely, and many used the opportunity to visit homes they had left during the war. Testimony submitted to the Rosen committee described a trade in obtaining permits for payment.

Land

The Absentees' Property Law (1950), the Development Authority Law (1950) and the Land Acquisition (Validation of Acts and Compensation) Law (1953) were used to expropriate land both from refugees and from Arabs who had remained in Israel, including those classified as "present absentees".

Sectarian policy

Minorities were divided into groups according to religion and ethnicity; for example, the obligations and rights of Druze, such as military service, differed from those of Muslims.

Employment vetting

Employees of Arab local authorities and of local health and education services were hired only with Shin Bet approval; in Arab schools this practice continued until 2009.

Exile and restriction orders

The lawyer Sabri Jiryis described the humiliation of the permit system and the use of internal exile, mostly for political reasons: those exiled were sent far from home without means of livelihood and ordered to report to distant police stations several times a day.

Arab citizens retained the right to vote for the Knesset throughout the period. They were represented mainly by Maki, a joint Jewish–Arab party, and by Mapai's Arab satellite lists, which operated in coordination with the ruling party.

== Opposition and resistance ==
=== Arab opposition ===
Many Arab citizens opposed the military government openly. In the Knesset the opposition was led by Maki: MKs Tawfik Toubi and Emile Habibi attacked it from the rostrum and in the party newspaper Al-Ittihad, and Toubi and Meir Vilner gathered testimony from survivors of the Kafr Qasim massacre and publicised it despite military censorship. Tawfiq Ziad, confined to Nazareth in the 1950s, wrote a letter of protest to Jewish and Arab local leaders.

In 1958 the police again banned Maki's Labour Day march in Nazareth. On 1 May clashes broke out between demonstrators and police, and a few days later in Umm al-Fahm. Police arrested about 350 party activists and Arab citizens; some were exiled or restricted by administrative order and others tried in military courts. On 22 May 1958, 92 detainees still held wrote to the Prime Minister, the Minister of Justice and the Knesset presidium protesting their detention without trial and demanding release or a civilian trial. In Tel Aviv a "Public Committee for the Release of the Military Government Detainees" distributed a leaflet calling on the Jewish public to join the protest, including articles by Shabtai Teveth and a poem by Natan Alterman.

In July 1958 the "Arab Front" (later the "Popular Front") was founded in Nazareth, uniting communists and Arab nationalists and demanding the abolition of military rule, the return of expropriated land and the return of refugees; the Interior Ministry refused to register it. In 1959, amid the rivalry between Gamal Abdel Nasser and Abd al-Karim Qasim, the nationalists left and founded al-Ard. The Defence Minister declared it an unlawful association in November 1964, and in 1965 its electoral list was barred from the Knesset elections (Yeredor v. Chairman of the Central Elections Committee).

=== Resistance poetry ===
Protest poetry developed among Arab citizens during these years, which Ghassan Kanafani introduced to readers in the Arab world as "resistance literature". Many of its poets, including Mahmoud Darwish and Samih al-Qasim, were associated with Maki and wrote for its newspapers, and the authorities restricted their movements. Darwish was arrested several times from 1961 and placed under restriction orders and house arrest; he and al-Qasim continued to be detained under the emergency regulations after military rule ended.

=== Collaboration ===
Alongside the opponents were Arabs who cooperated with the military government, including notables, mukhtars and representatives of Mapai's satellite lists. In return they received travel permits, jobs, licences and other benefits, and the security services used them to secure Arab votes for Mapai. After the May Day events of 1958, meetings were held in many Arab localities at which speakers dissociated themselves from the Maki demonstrations, and Christian and Muslim leaders sent letters and telegrams to the Prime Minister's Office against them.

=== Jewish opposition ===
Criticism grew within the Jewish public over the years, expressed in satire, songs and cartoons. Many opponents still considered Arab citizens a potential security threat, but argued that military rule itself deepened alienation; others stressed Israel's democratic and liberal commitments. Opponents came from across the spectrum, including Menachem Begin on the right, Yaakov Hazan on the left, the liberal Pinchas Rosen, Haim-Moshe Shapira of the religious camp, Moshe Dayan and Moshe Sharett. Yigal Allon called it anti-democratic and anti-educational. Speaking in the Knesset on 20 February 1962, Begin argued that the regulations placed a question mark over the basic rights of every citizen, adding that "borrowed freedom is not freedom". In 1963 a large Jewish–Arab demonstration was held outside the Mograbi cinema in Tel Aviv, with the participation of intellectuals including Martin Buber, Yeshayahu Leibowitz, Ephraim Urbach and Don Patinkin.

== Commissions of inquiry ==
=== Ratner Committee (1955–1956) ===
On 6 December 1955 the government appointed a civilian committee chaired by Professor Yohanan Ratner, with former Jerusalem mayor Daniel Auster and Haifa lawyer Yaakov Salomon, to consider whether military rule should be abolished. Over January and February 1956 it heard 39 Jewish and 50 Arab witnesses and toured the three districts. Nearly all the Arab witnesses said the hostility felt by Arab citizens towards the state stemmed from the military government's actions; Mapam MKs Rostam Bastuni and Yusuf Khamis said it had failed to stop espionage, smuggling and infiltration and accused it of serving to mobilise votes for the ruling party.

On 24 February 1956 the committee concluded that military rule was necessary to prevent the return of refugees, deter hostile activity and stop Arabs from interfering with the settlement of new immigrants in border areas, and that it could not be further reduced. The conclusions provoked protest from Arab leaders, Jewish intellectuals and Mapam, then a coalition partner. Much of the committee's material remains classified.

=== Rosen Committee (1959) ===
In late 1959 Ben-Gurion appointed a ministerial committee chaired by Justice Minister Pinchas Rosen, with Mordechai Bentov, Kadish Luz, Bechor-Shalom Sheetrit and Yosef Burg (later replaced by Yisrael Bar-Yehuda). Among the witnesses were Shin Bet head Isser Harel, who supported continued military rule as a check on Arab communists and Nasserism, and Arab representatives who submitted a petition signed by about 1,000 residents of Qalansawe, Umm al-Fahm and Tayibe protesting the denial of freedom of movement. A majority of three (Rosen, Bentov and Bar-Yehuda) against two recommended ending the military government, while retaining the emergency regulations. The government rejected the recommendation, and Ben-Gurion threatened to resign.

== Easing, 1958–1963 ==
Several factors led the government to ease restrictions in Ben-Gurion's last years. After the 1956 Sinai war the establishment concluded that Arab citizens would not leave the country; Shmuel Divon, the Adviser on Arab Affairs, wrote that the possibility of a mass Arab departure should be removed from policy planning. The Kafr Qasim massacre and the subsequent trial, in which eight of eleven defendants were convicted, shocked public opinion. An economic boom from 1958 created demand for Arab labour: according to the Central Bureau of Statistics, the number of Arabs employed in the Jewish economy rose from about 10,000 in 1959 to 40,000 in 1966.

On 5 August 1959 the government allowed Arabs to travel from the military government areas into Jewish towns, though not into other military government areas, and from 1959 Arabs were admitted as members of the Histadrut. In February 1960 Herut and the General Zionists tabled motions against military rule; Herut sought to replace the Mandatory regulations with Israeli legislation rather than abolish it outright. These and later bills in 1962 were defeated by the coalition.

== Abolition, 1963–1966 ==
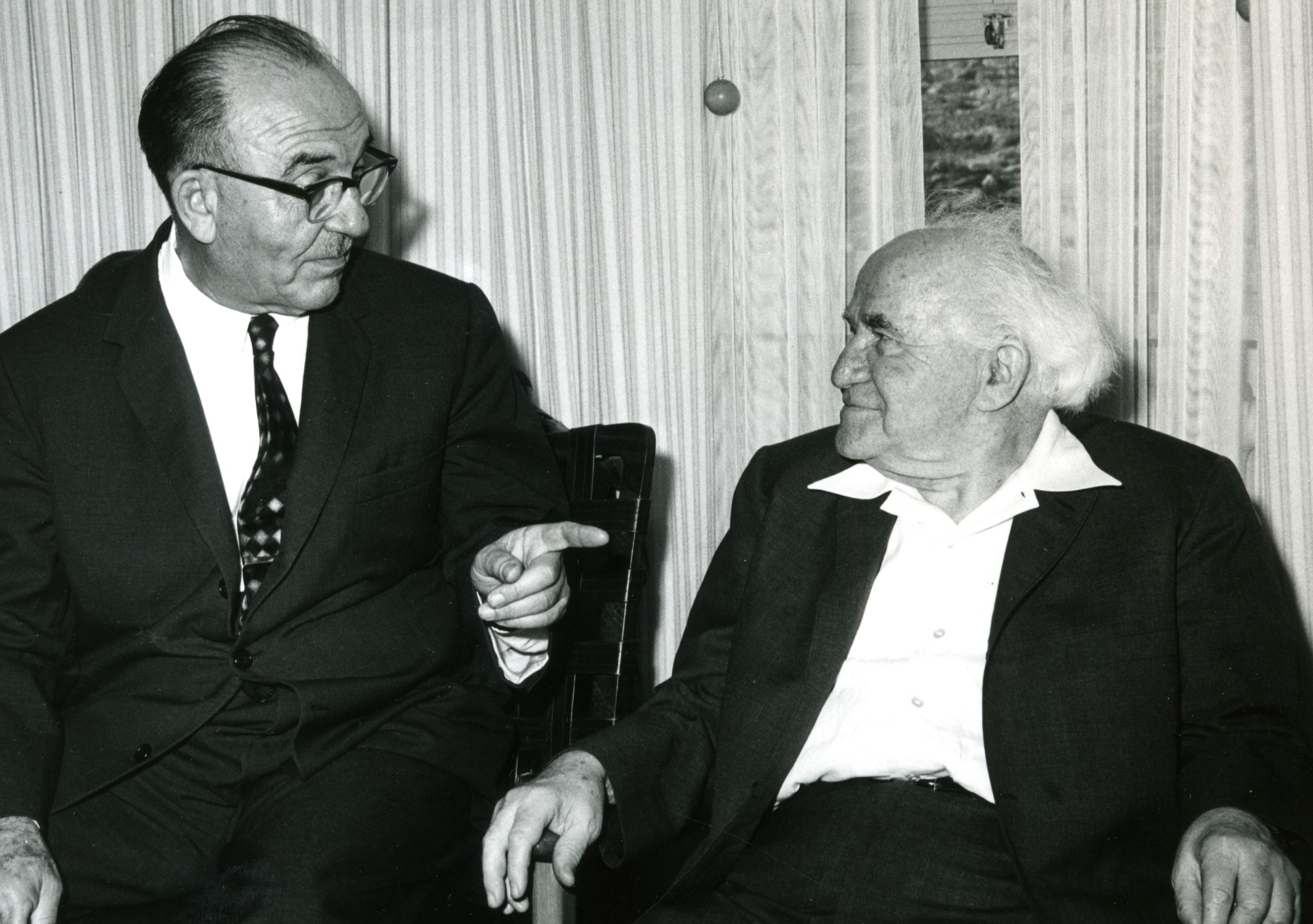
Levi Eshkol (left) takes over from David Ben-Gurion as prime minister, 1963

In February 1963 Maki, Mapam, Ahdut HaAvoda and Herut each submitted bills to abolish the military government. They were defeated by a single vote; among those voting against were two Arab MKs of Mapai's satellite list Cooperation and Brotherhood, Jabr Muadi and Diab Obeid.

Ben-Gurion resigned in June 1963 and was succeeded by Levi Eshkol. On 21 October 1963 Eshkol exempted the entire Arab population of the Galilee and the Triangle from the requirement to carry personal travel permits, except for individuals deemed security risks and residents of several villages directly on the border. He said he intended to continue easing restrictions without abolishing the system, and to make the military government "seeing but unseen". Uri Avnery responded in the Knesset that a "secret and illegal government" was operating in the Arab sector. Eshkol's government simultaneously promoted Jewish settlement in the Galilee, for which the military government was still considered necessary.

Unlike Ben-Gurion, Eshkol did not see a link between the military government and Israel's deterrence, and regarded Arab citizens as legitimate residents who could be brought to cooperate with, or at least not oppose, the state. The departure of Rafi, many of whose members had supported military rule, from the government made a majority for abolition possible. In 1965 Shmuel Toledano, a long-standing supporter of abolition, became Adviser on Arab Affairs; the Central Security Committee then voted three to one for abolition, with only the military government's commander, Colonel Yehoshua Verbin, backed by Chief of Staff Yitzhak Rabin, opposed. Isser Harel, now the Prime Minister's adviser on security, had also come to oppose its continuation.

On 12 January 1966 Eshkol announced the government's intention to dismantle the military government within the year. The Knesset endorsed the decision on 8 November 1966, and the apparatus was abolished on 1 December 1966. Because it operated under the emergency regulations, the government could have ended it without Knesset approval.

== Aftermath ==
Not all restrictions ended immediately; many powers passed to the Israel Police and were lifted gradually. Opposition MKs, including Toubi and Avnery, called the change cosmetic, and Moshe Dayan remarked that a police apparatus would simply replace the military one in enforcing the same law. A general order of 22 September 1967 lifting most movement restrictions still barred Arab citizens from approaching the nuclear reactor at Dimona, the Jordanian border in the Arava, and Sinai. Following the Six-Day War, enforcement of the emergency regulations against Arab citizens ceased in 1968, and responsibility for them passed to the relevant civilian ministries.

The military government department of the General Staff became the Regional Security Department, responsible for powers such as curfews and movement restrictions. Its last head, Colonel Shlomo Gazit, became the first Coordinator of Government Activities in the Territories. Historians have noted continuities between the military government and Israel's administration of the territories occupied in 1967, and some Palestinian commentators argue that its legacy continues to shape the relationship between the state and its Arab citizens. In a 2015 Knesset session marking 120 years since Eshkol's birth, opposition leader Isaac Herzog described the abolition as a revolutionary and courageous step.

== Heads of the military government ==
Name	Term	Notes
Major General Elimelech Avner	3 September 1948 – December 1949	
Lieutenant Colonel Emmanuel Mor	December 1949 – 1951	
Colonel Mishael Shaham	September 1955 – March 1960	Department transferred to the IDF and placed under the Operations Directorate
Colonel Yosef Pressman	March 1960 – 1 January 1962	
Colonel Yehoshua Verbin	1 January 1962 – 6 May 1966	
Colonel Eliezer Lif	6 May 1966 – 1 December 1967	Department renamed Regional Security Department
Colonel Shlomo Gazit	1 December 1967 –	Department effectively merged into COGAT, which Gazit headed concurrently

== See also ==
- Arab citizens of Israel
- Kafr Qasim massacre
- Defence (Emergency) Regulations
- Absentees' Property Law
- Present absentees
- Al-Ard
- Israeli Military Governorate – the 1967–1981 administration of the occupied territories
