= Elias Nakhleh =

Israeli Arab politician (1913-1990)

- إلياس نخلة
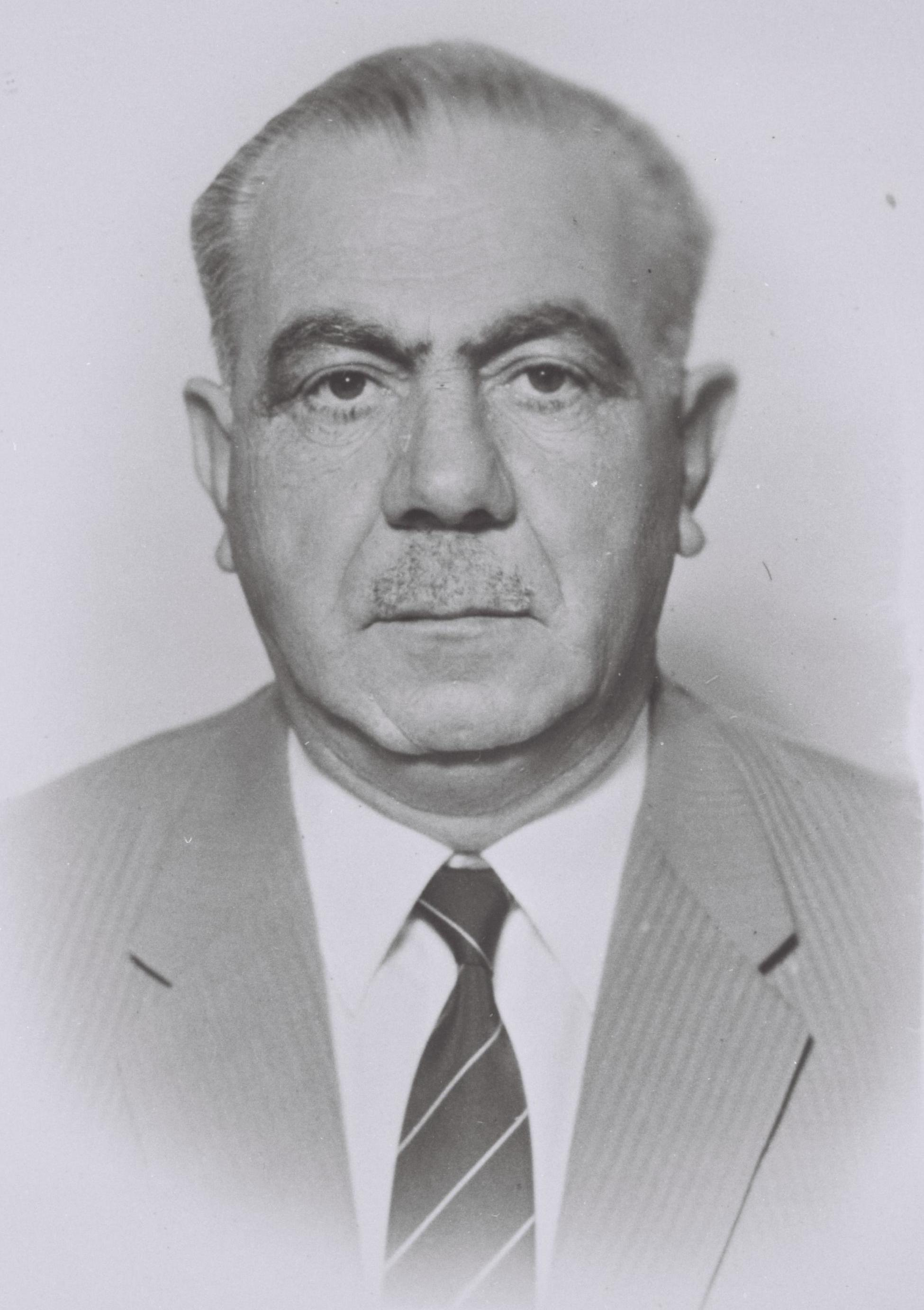

Faction represented in the Knesset
- 1959–1966: Progress and Development
- 1966–1967: Cooperation and Development
- 1967–1968: Progress and Development
- 1968–1969: Jewish-Arab Brotherhood
- 1969–1974: Cooperation and Brotherhood

Personal details
- Born: 1913 Rameh, Ottoman Empire
- Died: 6 September 1990 (aged 76–77)

Elias Nakhleh (Arabic: إلياس نخلة, Hebrew: אליאס נח'לה; 1913 – 6 September 1990) was an Israeli Arab politician who served as a member of the Knesset between 1959 and 1974.

== Biography ==
Born in Rameh during the Ottoman era, Nakhleh joined the British Army and served in Lebanon, returning to Israel in 1948.

A member of Rameh's local council, he ran in the 1955 Knesset elections in second place on the Arab List. However, the list received only 0.5% of the vote and failed to win a seat. However, he was elected to the Knesset in 1959 after being placed second on the Progress and Development list, and was re-elected in 1961 and 1965. In 1966 the party merged with Cooperation and Brotherhood to form Cooperation and Development, but split the following year. In 1968 Nakhleh formed a single-member faction, Jewish-Arab Brotherhood, which he remained a member of until the 1969 elections. In the elections he was returned to the Knesset in second place on the Cooperation and Brotherhood list, and was appointed Deputy Speaker. He lost his seat in the 1973 elections, in which the party failed to cross the electoral threshold.

In 1990 he received the Presidential Medal for his tireless efforts at resolving conflicts and promoting tolerance. He died the same year.
