= Jabr Muadi =

Israeli Druze politician (1919–2009)

- جبر داهش معدي
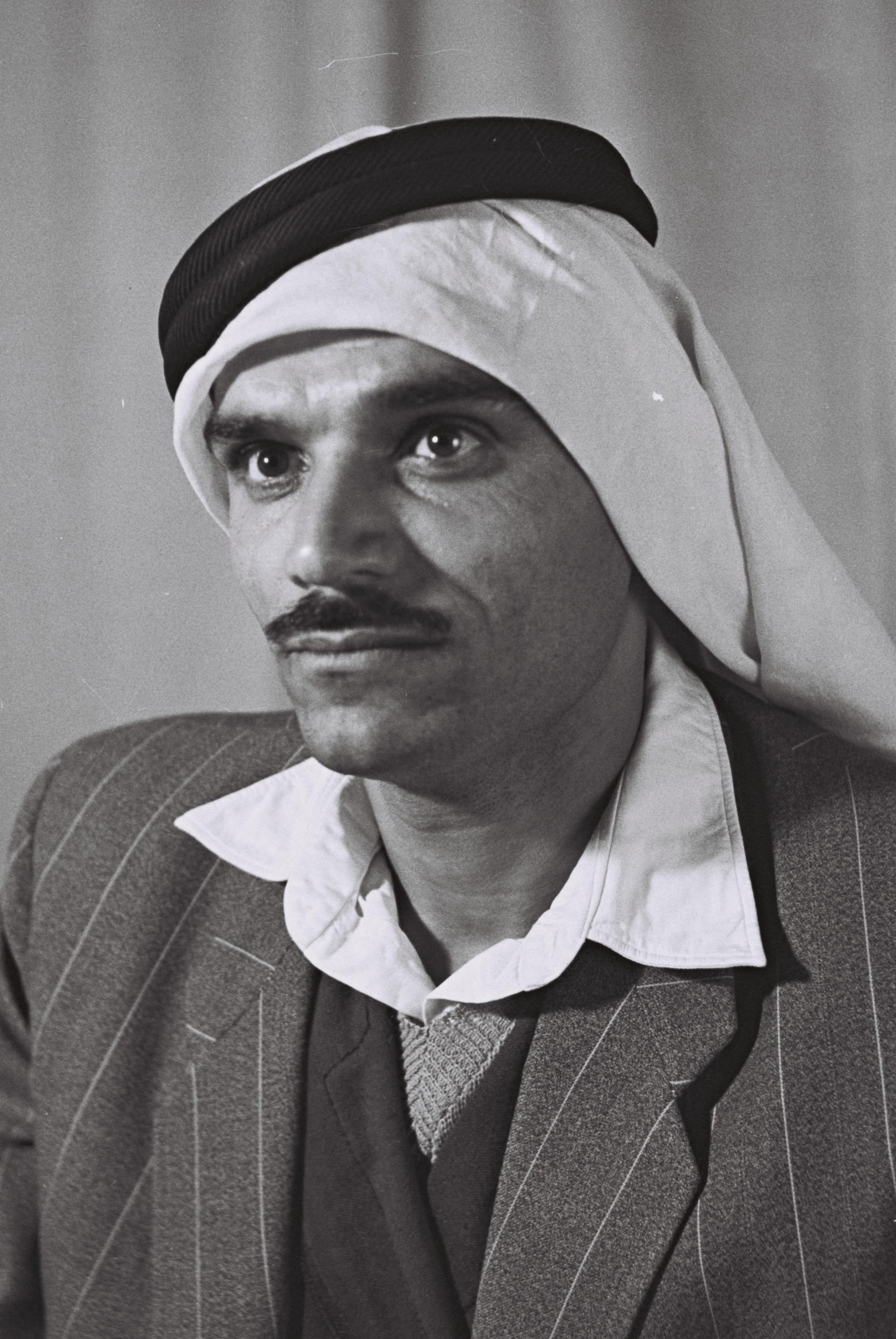
- Muadi in 1951

Faction represented in the Knesset
- 1951–1955: Democratic List for Israeli Arabs
- 1956–1959: Democratic List for Israeli Arabs
- 1961–1966: Cooperation and Brotherhood
- 1966–1967: Cooperation and Development
- 1967: Cooperation and Brotherhood
- 1967–1969: Druze Party
- 1969–1974: Progress and Development
- 1974–1976: Alignment
- 1976–1977: Progress and Development
- 1977: United Arab List
- 1981: United Arab List

Personal details
- Born: 1 April 1919; Yirka, OETA, Palestine
- Died: 19 May 2009 (aged 90)

Sheikh Jabr Muadi (Arabic: جبر داهش معدي; Hebrew: ג'בר מועדי; 1 April 1919 – 19 May 2009) was an Israeli Druze politician who served as a member of the Knesset for seven different parties between 1951 and 1981.

== Biography ==
Born in Yirka in British-controlled Palestine, Muadi was first elected to the Knesset in 1951 as a member of the Democratic List for Israeli Arabs. Although he lost his seat in the 1955 elections, he returned to the Knesset on 13 February 1956 as a replacement for Seif el-Din el-Zubi. He lost his seat again in the 1959 elections.

He returned to the Knesset again after being elected on the Cooperation and Brotherhood list in 1961. He retained his seat in the 1965 elections. The following year Cooperation and Brotherhood merged with Progress and Development to form Cooperation and Development. The two parties split again on 1 January 1967, and on 11 April, Muadi broke away to form his own single-member faction, the Druze Party, which he represented until the 1969 elections.

In the elections he was returned to the Knesset on the Progress and Development list, and on 27 October 1971 was appointed Deputy Minister of Communications, becoming the second non-Jew to be part of an Israeli government. He was re-elected in 1973. In February 1974 the party merged into the Alignment, and on 6 May Muadi was re-appointed to his deputy ministerial post. On 24 March 1975 he became Deputy Minister of Agriculture. On 8 June 1976 Progress and Development left the Alignment, and the following year merged with the Arab List for Bedouins and Villagers to form the United Arab List, the seventh party Muadi had represented in the Knesset. Despite leaving the Alignment, he remained a deputy minister.

He lost his seat in the 1977 elections, but was due to re-enter the Knesset as part of a rotation deal with other party members. However, after Hamad Abu Rabia went back on a deal to resign his seat in order for Muadi to take it (a court had ruled the agreement was invalid), he was shot dead by Muadi's sons. Despite threats of revenge, Muadi took his seat on 12 January 1981. He lost his seat for the final time in the 1981 elections, in which the United Arab List failed to cross the electoral threshold.

He died in 2009 at the age of 90.
