= Cooperation and Development =

Cooperation and Development שיתוף ופיתוח إشراك وتطوير
- Founded: 5 July 1966
- Dissolved: 1 January 1967
- Merger of: Cooperation and Brotherhood and Progress and Development
- Ideology: Israeli Arab interest
- National affiliation: Mapai
- Most MKs: 4 (1966-1967)
- Fewest MKs: 4 (1966-1967)

Cooperation and Development (Hebrew: שיתוף ופיתוח, Shituf VePituah; Arabic: إشراك وتطوير) was a short-lived Arab satellite list in Israel.

== History ==
Cooperation and Development was established on 5 July 1966 during the sixth Knesset, when two of the three Israeli Arab parties, Cooperation and Brotherhood and Progress and Development, merged. Both parties had had two seats, meaning the new union had four, which were taken by Seif el-Din el-Zoubi, Jabr Muadi, Elias Nakhleh and Diyab Obeid.

Both parties had been part of Levi Eshkol's coalition government, as they were associated with the Alignment, and the new party assumed their place as a coalition member.

However, on 1 January 1967, the party split into the original factions. Later during the Knesset session both parties split again, as Muadi broke away from Cooperation and Brotherhood to form the Druze Party, whilst Nakhleh broke away from Progress and Development to form the Jewish-Arab Brotherhood. However, by the 1969 elections, Muadi had joined Progress and Development, whilst Nakhleh had become a member of Cooperation and Brotherhood, the two effectively swapping parties.
