= Jewish–Arab Brotherhood =

Political party in Israel

Jewish-Arab Brotherhood אחווה יהודית־ערבית الأخوة اليهودية العربية
- Leader: Elias Nakhleh
- Founded: 22 October 1968
- Dissolved: 1969
- Split from: Progress and Development
- Merged into: Cooperation and Brotherhood
- Ideology: Israeli Arab interests
- Most MKs: 1 (1968–1969)
- Fewest MKs: 1 (1968–1969)

Jewish–Arab Brotherhood (Hebrew: אחווה יהודית־ערבית, Ahva Yehudit-Aravit; Arabic: الأخوة اليهودية العربية) was a short-lived, one-man political party in Israel.

== Background ==
The party was formed on 22 October 1968, during the sixth Knesset, when Elias Nakhleh broke away from Progress and Development.

For the 1969 elections, Nakhleh merged the party into Cooperation and Brotherhood, effectively swapping parties with Jabr Muadi, who had begun the session as a member of Cooperation and Brotherhood, then left to set up the Israeli Druze Faction, before joining Progress and Development.
