= Israeli Druze Faction =

- Arabic name: الكتلة الدرزية الإسرائيلية
- Hebrew name: הסיעה הדרוזית הישראלית
- Leader: Jabr Muadi
- Founded: 11 April 1967
- Dissolved: 1969
- Split from: Cooperation and Brotherhood
- Merged into: Progress and Development
- Ideology: Druze interest
- Most MKs: 1 (1967–1969)
- Fewest MKs: 1 (1967–1969)

The Israeli Druze Faction (Arabic: الكتلة الدرزية الإسرائيلية, al-Ketla al-Druzia al-Isra'iliah, Hebrew: הסיעה הדרוזית הישראלית, HaSia'a HaDruzit HaYisraelit), also known as the Druze Party, was a short-lived, one-man political faction in Israel.

== History ==
The party was established on 11 April 1967 during the sixth Knesset, when Jabr Muadi left Cooperation and Brotherhood.

Before the 1969 elections, Muadi joined Progress and Development, thus effectively swapping parties with Elias Nakhleh, who had begun the session as a member of Progress and Development, then left to set up the Jewish–Arab Brotherhood before joining Cooperation and Brotherhood.

== See also ==
- Politics of Israel
