= Progress and Development =

Arab satellite list in Israel (1959-1977)

Progress and Development קידמה ופיתוח تقدم وتطور
- Founded: 1959
- Dissolved: 8 March 1977
- Split from: Cooperation and Development (1967); Alignment (1976)
- Merged into: Cooperation and Development (1966); Alignment (1974); United Arab List (1977)
- Ideology: Israeli Arab interests
- National affiliation: Mapai
- Most MKs: 2 (1959–66, 1967–68, 1969–77)
- Fewest MKs: 1 (1968–1969)

Election symbol
- רא

Progress and Development (Hebrew: קידמה ופיתוח, Kidma VePituah; Arabic: تقدم وتطور) was an Arab satellite list in Israel.

== History ==
Progress and Development was established in 1959, drawing its support from the Galilee area. Like other Israeli Arab parties at the time, it was associated with David Ben-Gurion's Mapai party, as Ben-Gurion was keen to include Israeli Arabs in the functioning of the state in order to prove Jews and Arabs could co-exist peacefully and productively.

In the 1959 elections, the party won 1.3% of the votes and two seats, making it the most popular Israeli Arab party in the Knesset. Its seats were taken by Ahmed A-Dahar and Elias Nakhleh. Because of its association with Mapai, the party joined the governing coalition.

In the 1961 elections the party increased its share of the vote to 1.6%, though it was overtaken as the most popular Israeli Arab party by Cooperation and Brotherhood, who won 1.9% of the vote. Despite its increased vote, the party still won only two seats, retained by A-Dahar and Nakhleh, and was again part of all three coalition governments during the fifth Knesset.

In the 1965 elections the party increased its share of the vote again, to 1.9%, overtaking Cooperation and Brotherhood to regain its place as the most popular Israeli Arab party. It joined Levi Eshkol's coalition government, and A-Dahar was replaced by Seif-El-Din El-Zubi, previously an MK for the Democratic List of Nazareth (in the first Knesset) and the Democratic List for Israeli Arabs (in the second and third Knessets). During the Knesset session the party briefly merged with Cooperation and Brotherhood to form Cooperation and Development, though the union split up soon after its formation. In October 1968 Nakhleh broke away from the party to form the Jewish–Arab Brotherhood, though he was elected to the next Knesset as a member of Cooperation and Brotherhood.

The 1969 elections saw a further increase in popularity to 2.1% of the vote, though it still won only two seats. Jabr Muadi (a former Democratic List for Israeli Arabs MK who had broken away from Cooperation and Brotherhood to form the Druze Party after Cooperation and Development had broken up, effectively swapping parties with Nahale) took the second seat, and the party was included in Golda Meir's coalition government. Muadi was appointed Deputy Minister of Communications in October 1971, making him only the second Israeli Arab to join the cabinet.

In the 1973 elections the party won only 1.4% of the vote, though it retained its two seats. Although it was excluded from Golda Meir's government despite still being aligned with the Labour Party, after she resigned and Yitzhak Rabin formed the 17th government, the party was invited back into the governing coalition and Muadi regained his deputy ministerial position.

During the Knesset session the party briefly became part of the Alignment before merging with the Arab List for Bedouins and Villagers to form the United Arab List.
