= Cooperation and Brotherhood =

Cooperation and Brotherhood مشاركة وأخوة שיתוף ואחווה
- Founded: 1950s
- Dissolved: 1970s
- Ideology: Israeli Arab interest
- National affiliation: Mapai/Labor Party
- Most MKs: 2 (1959–1967, 1969–1973)
- Fewest MKs: 1 (1967–1969)

Election symbol
- יא

Cooperation and Brotherhood (Hebrew: שיתוף ואחווה, Shituf VeAhva; Arabic: مشاركة وأخوة) was an Arab satellite list in Israel.

== History ==
Cooperation and Brotherhood was an Israeli Arab organisation formed to participate in the 1959 elections. Like other Israeli Arab parties at the time, it was associated with David Ben-Gurion's Mapai party, as Ben-Gurion was keen to include Israeli Arabs in the functioning of the state in order to prove Jews and Arabs could co-exist peacefully and productively. Its support base was Muslims and Druze in the Mount Carmel area.

In the elections, the party won 1.1% of the votes and two seats, which were taken by Labib Hussein Abu Rokan and Yussef Diab. Because of its association with Mapai, the party joined the governing coalition.

In the 1961 elections the party increased its share of the vote to 1.9%, overtaking Progress and Development to become the most popular Israeli Arab party in the Knesset. Despite its increased vote, the party still won only two seats, though it was again part of all three coalition governments during the fifth Knesset. Both Abu Rochan and Diab were replaced, their places taken by Jabr Muadi (formerly an MK for the Democratic List for Israeli Arabs) and Diyab Obeid.

The 1965 elections saw a drop in support to just 1.3% of the vote, though the party retained its two seats and was again included in the coalition government. On 5 July 1966 the party merged with Progress and Development to form Cooperation and Development, though the union split on 1 January 1967. On 11 April 1967, Muadi broke away from the party to form the Druze Party, though he was elected to the next Knesset as a member of Progress and Development.

In the 1969 elections the party retained its two seats with a small increase in its share of the vote to 1.4%. Elias Nakhleh (who had broken away from Progress and Development to form the Jewish-Arab Brotherhood after Cooperation and Development had broken up, effectively swapping parties with Muadi) took the second seat, and the party joined the governing coalition.

Winning only 0.6% of the vote, the party failed to cross the 1% electoral threshold in the 1973 elections and subsequently disappeared.
