= 1959 Israeli legislative election =

- 3 November 1959
- All 120 seats in the Knesset; 61 seats needed for a majority
- Turnout: 81.6% (▼1.2 pp)
Party	Leader	Vote %	Seats	+/–
Mapai	David Ben-Gurion	38.2	47	+7
Herut	Menachem Begin	13.5	17	+2
Mafdal	Haim-Moshe Shapira	9.9	12	+1
Mapam	Meir Ya'ari	7.2	9	0
General Zionists	Yosef Sapir	6.2	8	−5
Ahdut HaAvoda	Yisrael Galili	6.0	7	−3
Religious Torah Front	Yitzhak-Meir Levin	4.7	6	0
Progressive Party	Pinchas Rosen	4.6	6	+1
Maki	Shmuel Mikunis	2.8	3	−3
Progress and Development	Ahmed A-Dahar	1.3	2	New
Cooperation and Brotherhood	Labib Abu Rokan	1.1	2	New
Agriculture and Development	Mahmud Al-Nashaf	1.1	1	0
This lists parties that won seats. See the complete results below.
Prime Minister before	Prime Minister after
David Ben-Gurion; Mapai	David Ben-Gurion; Mapai

Legislative elections were held in Israel on 3 November 1959 to elect the 120 members of the fourth Knesset. Mapai remained the dominant party, gaining seven seats. Following the elections, Mapai leader David Ben-Gurion formed ninth government on 17 December 1959. His coalition included the National Religious Party, Mapam, Ahdut HaAvoda, the Progressive Party and the three Israeli Arab parties, Progress and Development, Cooperation and Brotherhood and Agriculture and Development. The government had 16 ministers. Mapai's Kadish Luz became the Speaker of the Knesset.

Voter turnout was 81.6%.

== Results ==
Party	Votes	%	Seats	+/–
Mapai	370,585	38.23	47	+7
Herut	130,515	13.46	17	+2
National Religious Party	95,581	9.86	12	+1
Mapam	69,468	7.17	9	0
General Zionists	59,700	6.16	8	−5
Ahdut HaAvoda	58,043	5.99	7	−3
Religious Torah Front	45,569	4.70	6	0
Progressive Party	44,889	4.63	6	+1
Maki	27,374	2.82	3	−3
Progress and Development	12,347	1.27	2	New
Cooperation and Brotherhood	11,104	1.15	2	New
Agriculture and Development	10,902	1.12	1	0
Union of North African Immigrants	8,199	0.85	0	New
Progress and Work	4,651	0.48	0	−2
Independent Faction for Israeli Arabs	3,818	0.39	0	New
Israeli Arab Labour Party	3,369	0.35	0	New
Sephardi National Party	3,133	0.32	0	New
National Union	2,456	0.25	0	0
Holocaust Handicapped and Injured Faction	1,765	0.18	0	New
Yemenite Faction	1,711	0.18	0	0
Independents	1,611	0.17	0	New
Socialist Union (Bund)	1,322	0.14	0	New
New Immigrants Front	631	0.07	0	0
Third Power	594	0.06	0	New
Total	969,337	100.00	120	0
Valid votes	969,337	97.49		
Invalid/blank votes	24,967	2.51		
Total votes	994,304	100.00		
Registered voters/turnout	1,218,483	81.60		
Source: IDI, Nohlen et al.

== Aftermath ==
The government collapsed when Ben-Gurion resigned on 31 January 1961, over a motion of no-confidence brought by Herut and the General Zionists in the wake of the Lavon Affair. When Ben-Gurion was unable to form a new government new elections were called. Serving one year and nine months, the fourth Knesset was the shortest Knesset term until the five-month twenty-first Knesset in 2019.

== See also ==
- List of members of the fourth Knesset
