= 1961 Israeli legislative election =

Elections for the fifth Knesset

- 15 August 1961
- Turnout: 81.57% (▼0.03 pp)
Party	Leader	Vote %	Seats	+/–
Mapai	David Ben-Gurion	34.69	42	−5
Herut	Menachem Begin	13.76	17	0
Liberal	Pinchas Rosen	13.63	17	+3
Mafdal	Haim-Moshe Shapira	9.81	12	0
Mapam	Meir Ya'ari	7.51	9	0
Ahdut HaAvoda	Yisrael Galili	6.57	8	+1
Maki	Shmuel Mikunis	4.18	5	+2
Agudat Yisrael	Yitzhak-Meir Levin	3.69	4	+1
PAI	Kalman Kahana	1.93	2	−1
Cooperation and Brotherhood	Diyab Obeid	1.92	2	0
Progress and Development	Ahmed A-Dahar	1.59	2	0
This lists parties that won seats. See the complete results below.
Prime Minister before	Prime Minister after
David Ben-Gurion; Mapai	David Ben-Gurion; Mapai

Elections for the fifth Knesset were held in Israel on 15 August 1961. Voter turnout was 81.6%.

== Parliament factions ==
The table below lists the parliamentary factions represented in the 4th Knesset.

Name	Ideology	Symbol	Leader	1959 result		Seats at 1964 dissolution
Name	Ideology	Symbol	Leader	Votes (%)	Seats	Seats at 1964 dissolution
Mapai	Social democracy Labor Zionism	א	David Ben-Gurion	38.2%	47 / 120	47 / 120
Herut	Revisionist Zionism	ח	Menachem Begin	13.5%	17 / 120	17 / 120
Liberal Party	Liberalism	ל	Pinchas Rosen; Peretz Bernstein	-	0 / 120	14 / 120
National Religious Party	Religious Zionism	ב	Haim-Moshe Shapira	9.9%	12 / 120	12 / 120
Mapam	Labor Zionism; Marxism	מ	Meir Ya'ari	7.2%	9 / 120	9 / 120
General Zionists	Liberalism	צ	Yosef Sapir	6.2%	8 / 120	0 / 120
Ahdut HaAvoda	Labor Zionism	תו	Yisrael Galili	6.0%	7 / 120	7 / 120
Agudat Yisrael	Religious conservatism	ג	Yitzhak-Meir Levin	4.7% (Note: Agudat Yisrael and PAI ran as a joint list called Religious Torah Front.)	3 / 120	3 / 120
Poalei Agudat Yisrael	Religious conservatism	ד	Kalman Kahana	4.7%	3 / 120	3 / 120
Progressive Party	Liberalism; Progressivism	פ	Pinchas Rosen	4.6%	6 / 120	0 / 120
Maki	Communism	ק	Shmuel Mikunis	2.8%	3 / 120	3 / 120
Progress and Development	Arab satellite list	רא	Ahmed A-Dahar	1.3%	2 / 120	2 / 120
Cooperation and Brotherhood	Arab satellite list	יא	Labib Hussein Abu Rokan	1.1%	2 / 120	2 / 120
Agriculture and Development	Arab satellite list	ע	Mahmud Al-Nashaf	1.1%	1 / 120	1 / 120

== Results ==
Party	Votes	%	Seats	+/–
Mapai	349,330	34.69	42	−5
Herut	138,599	13.76	17	0
Liberal Party	137,255	13.63	17	+3
National Religious Party	98,786	9.81	12	0
Mapam	75,654	7.51	9	0
Ahdut HaAvoda	66,170	6.57	8	+1
Maki	42,111	4.18	5	+2
Agudat Yisrael	37,178	3.69	4	0
Poalei Agudat Yisrael	19,428	1.93	2	0
Cooperation and Brotherhood	19,342	1.92	2	0
Progress and Development	16,034	1.59	2	0
Progress and Work	3,561	0.35	0	0
Religious Sephardim List	3,181	0.32	0	New
Supporters of Democracy	335	0.03	0	New
Total	1,006,964	100.00	120	0
Valid votes	1,006,964	97.10		
Invalid/blank votes	30,066	2.90		
Total votes	1,037,030	100.00		
Registered voters/turnout	1,271,285	81.57		
Source: IDI, Nohlen et al.

== Aftermath ==
Campaign posters for Herut, Mapai, and the Liberal Party before the 1961 elections.

During the Knesset term, eight MKs broke away from Mapai to establish Rafi and two MKs left Maki to establish Rakah. Herut and the Liberal Party merged to form Gahal. Seven Liberal Party members unhappy with the decision (largely former Progressive Party members) broke away to form the Independent Liberals.

=== Tenth government ===
The fifth Knesset started with David Ben-Gurion's Mapai party forming the tenth government on 2 November 1961. His coalition included the National Religious Party, Ahdut HaAvoda, Agudat Israel Workers, Cooperation and Brotherhood and Progress and Development, and had 13 ministers. Kadish Luz of Mapai was appointed Knesset Speaker. The government collapsed when Ben-Gurion resigned on 16 June 1963 citing personal reasons, but in reality was annoyed at a perceived lack of support from his colleagues. He later broke away from Mapai with several colleagues to form Rafi.

=== Eleventh government ===
Levi Eshkol took over Mapai and formed the eleventh government on 26 June 1963 with the same coalition partners as previously, but one more minister. The government resigned on 10 December 1964 when Ben-Gurion demanded that members of the Supreme Court investigate the Lavon Affair.

=== Twelfth government ===
Eshkol formed the twelfth government a week later on 22 December 1964 with the same coalition partners and ministers as previously.

The fifth Knesset was notable for the coalescing of the two major right-wing parties (Herut and the Liberal Party) to form an electoral block (Gahal) capable of threatening Mapai's hegemony in Israeli politics. Gahal, which by then had become Likud, finally overtook Mapai (which had merged into the Alignment) in the 1977 elections.
