= 1965 Israeli legislative election =

- 2 November 1965
- All 120 seats in the Knesset; 61 seats needed for a majority
- Turnout: 85.86% (▲4.29pp)
Party	Leader	Vote %	Seats	+/–
Labor Alignment	Levi Eshkol	36.74	45	−5
Gahal	Menachem Begin	21.29	26	−8
Mafdal	Haim-Moshe Shapira	8.95	11	−1
Rafi	David Ben-Gurion	7.90	10	New
Mapam	Meir Ya'ari	6.63	8	−1
Independent Liberals	Pinchas Rosen	3.75	5	New
Agudat Yisrael	Yitzhak-Meir Levin	3.30	4	0
Rakah	Meir Vilner	2.27	3	New
PAI	Kalman Kahana	1.83	2	0
Progress and Development	Seif el-Din el-Zoubi	1.36	2	0
Cooperation and Brotherhood	Diyab Obeid	1.36	2	0
HaOlam HaZeh	Uri Avnery	1.17	1	New
Maki	Shmuel Mikunis	1.13	1	−4
This lists parties that won seats. See the complete results below.
Prime Minister before	Prime Minister after
Levi Eshkol; Mapai	Levi Eshkol; Alignment

Elections for the sixth Knesset were held in Israel on 2 November 1965. Voter turnout was 85.9%.

== Background ==
Prior to the elections, two major alliances were formed; Mapai and Ahdut HaAvoda united to form the Alignment, whilst Herut and the Liberal Party had formed the Gahal alliance towards the end of the previous Knesset session. However, both Mapai and the Liberal Party had been hit by breakaway factions, the Ben-Gurion led Rafi and the Independent Liberals (largely composed of former Progressive Party members) respectively.

The communist Maki had also experienced a split earlier in the year, with most of its Arab members and some Jewish members breaking away to establish Rakah.

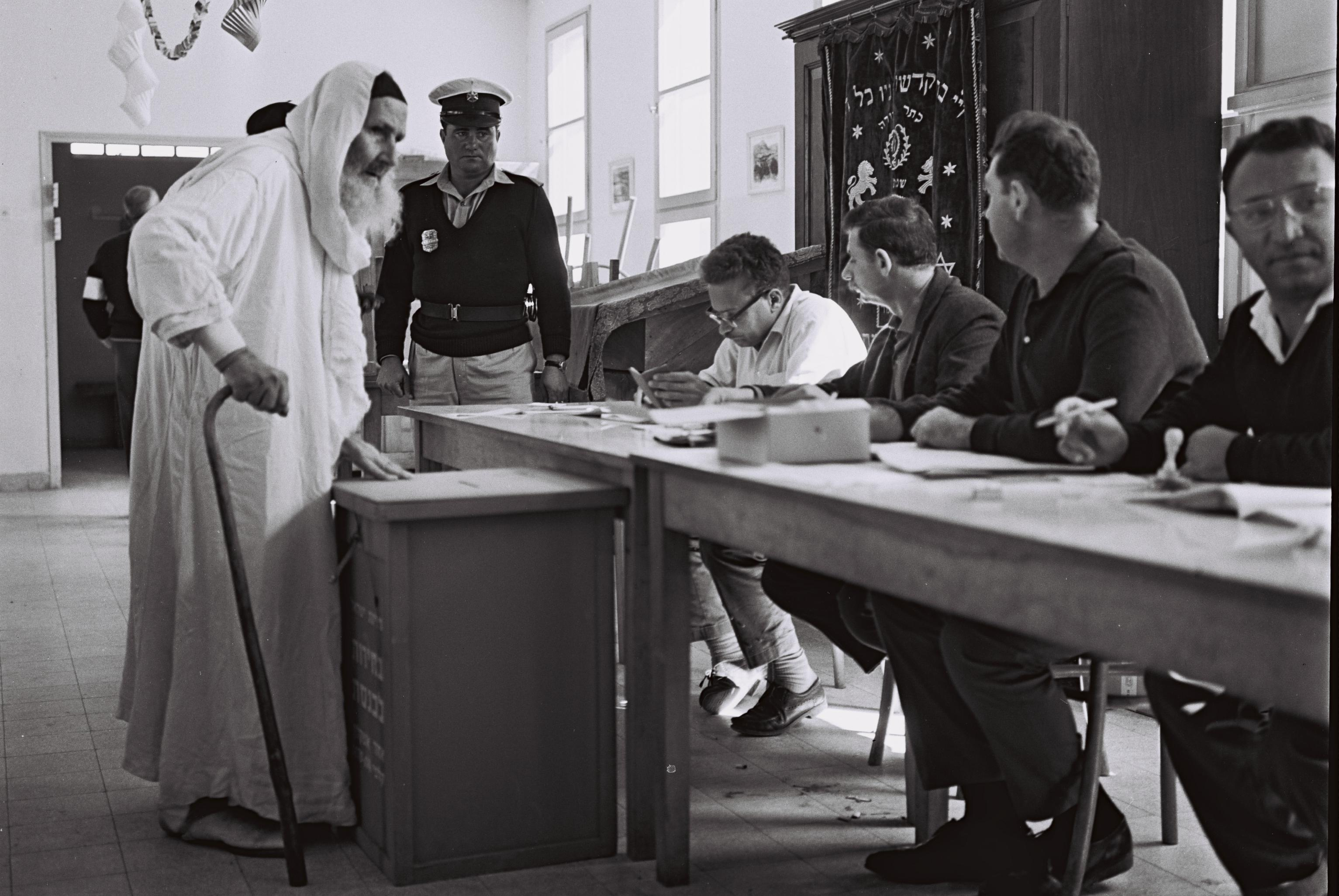
Elder Israeli citizen of Moroccan origin voting in Ashdod, 1965

A new Mapai-affiliated Arab party, Cooperation and Brotherhood was formed to contest the election, whilst the Arab Socialist List was prevented from running by the Central Elections Committee due to its links with the banned al-Ard organisation. Peace activist Abie Nathan entered a party list, Nes.

== Parliament factions ==
The table below lists the parliamentary factions represented in the 6th Knesset.

Name	Ideology	Symbol	Leader	1961 result		Seats at 1964 dissolution
Name	Ideology	Symbol	Leader	Votes (%)	Seats	Seats at 1964 dissolution
Mapai	Social democracy Labor Zionism	א	Levi Eshkol	34.7%	42 / 120	34 / 120
Herut	Revisionist Zionism	ח	Menachem Begin	13.8%	17 / 120	17 / 120
Libralit	Liberalism	ל	Peretz Bernstein; Yosef Serlin	13.6%	17 / 120	10 / 120
Mafdal	Religious Zionism	ב	Haim-Moshe Shapira	9.8%	12 / 120	12 / 120
Mapam	Labor Zionism; Marxism	מ	Meir Ya'ari	7.8%	9 / 120	9 / 120
Ahdut HaAvoda	Labor Zionism	תו	Yisrael Galili	6.6%	8 / 120	8 / 120
Rafi	Social democracy	כא	David Ben-Gurion	-	0 / 120	8 / 120
Independent Liberals	Liberalism	לע	Pinchas Rosen	-	0 / 120	7 / 120
Maki	Communism	ק	Shmuel Mikunis	4.2%	5 / 120	5 / 120
Agudat Yisrael	Religious conservatism	ג	Yitzhak-Meir Levin	3.7%	4 / 120	4 / 120
Poalei Agudat Yisrael	Religious conservatism	ד	Kalman Kahana	1.9%	2 / 120	2 / 120
Cooperation and Brotherhood	Arab satellite list	יא	Diyab Obeid	1.9%	2 / 120	2 / 120
Progress and Development	Arab satellite list	רא	Ahmed A-Dahar	1.6%	2 / 120	2 / 120

== Results ==
Party	Votes	%	Seats	+/–
Labour Alignment	443,379	36.74	45	−5
Gahal	256,957	21.29	26	−8
National Religious Party	107,966	8.95	11	−1
Rafi	95,328	7.90	10	New
Mapam	79,985	6.63	8	−1
Independent Liberals	45,299	3.75	5	New
Agudat Yisrael	39,795	3.30	4	0
Rakah	27,413	2.27	3	New
Progress and Development	23,430	1.94	2	0
Poalei Agudat Yisrael	22,066	1.83	2	0
Cooperation and Brotherhood	16,464	1.36	2	0
HaOlam HaZeh – Koah Hadash	14,124	1.17	1	New
Maki	13,617	1.13	1	−4
Movement for Brotherhood	11,244	0.93	0	New
Peace List	5,536	0.46	0	New
Nes	2,135	0.18	0	New
Young Israel	1,990	0.16	0	New
Total	1,206,728	100.00	120	0
Valid votes	1,206,728	96.95		
Invalid/blank votes	37,978	3.05		
Total votes	1,244,706	100.00		
Registered voters/turnout	1,449,709	85.86		
Source: IDI, Nohlen et al.

== Aftermath ==
The sixth Knesset started with Levi Eshkol's Alignment forming the thirteenth government on 12 January 1966. His coalition included the National Religious Party, Mapam, the Independent Liberals, Poalei Agudat Yisrael, Progress and Development and Cooperation and Brotherhood, and had eighteen ministers. Kadish Luz of the Alignment retained his position as Knesset Speaker. At the end of August, 1966 the new Knesset at Givat Ram in Jerusalem was opened. When the Six-Day War broke out on 5 June 1967, Gahal and Rafi joined the coalition to form a national unity government with 21 ministers. The government was ended by Eshkol's death on 26 February 1969.

Golda Meir of the Alignment formed the fourteenth government, also a national unity government, on 17 March 1969. The coalition partners were Gahal, the National Religious Party, the Independent Liberals, Progress and Development and Cooperation and Brotherhood.

In 1968 Rafi, Mapai and Ahdut HaAvoda merged into the Labor Party in 1968, although David Ben-Gurion (Rafi) became an independent. In 1969 the Labor Party formed an alliance with Mapam also named the Alignment. The new Alignment held 63 seats, the only time a single faction has ever held a majority in the Knesset. Other affiliation changes during the Knesset term included Yizhar Harari leaving the Independent Liberals to join the Alignment, four MKs breaking away from Gahal to establish the Free Centre and Progress and Development and Cooperation and Brotherhood merging to form Cooperation and Development (which then broke up into the two original parties, the Druze Party and Jewish-Arab Brotherhood, each with a single seat).
