= 1969 Israeli legislative election =

- 28 October 1969
- All 120 seats in the Knesset; 61 seats needed for a majority
- Turnout: 81.66% (▼4.20pp)
Party	Leader	Vote %	Seats	+/–
Alignment	Golda Meir	46.21	56	−7
Gahal	Menachem Begin	21.66	26	0
Mafdal	Haim-Moshe Shapira	9.74	12	+1
Agudat Yisrael	Yitzhak-Meir Levin	3.22	4	0
Independent Liberals	Moshe Kol	3.21	4	−1
National List	David Ben-Gurion	3.12	4	New
Rakah	Meir Vilner	2.84	3	0
Progress and Development	Seif el-Din el-Zoubi	2.05	2	0
PAI	Kalman Kahana	1.83	2	0
Cooperation and Brotherhood	Diyab Obeid	1.46	2	0
HaOlam Hazeh	Uri Avnery	1.23	2	+1
Free Centre	Shmuel Tamir	1.20	2	New
Maki	Moshe Sneh	1.15	1	0
This lists parties that won seats. See the complete results below.
Prime Minister before	Prime Minister after
Golda Meir; Alignment	Golda Meir; Alignment

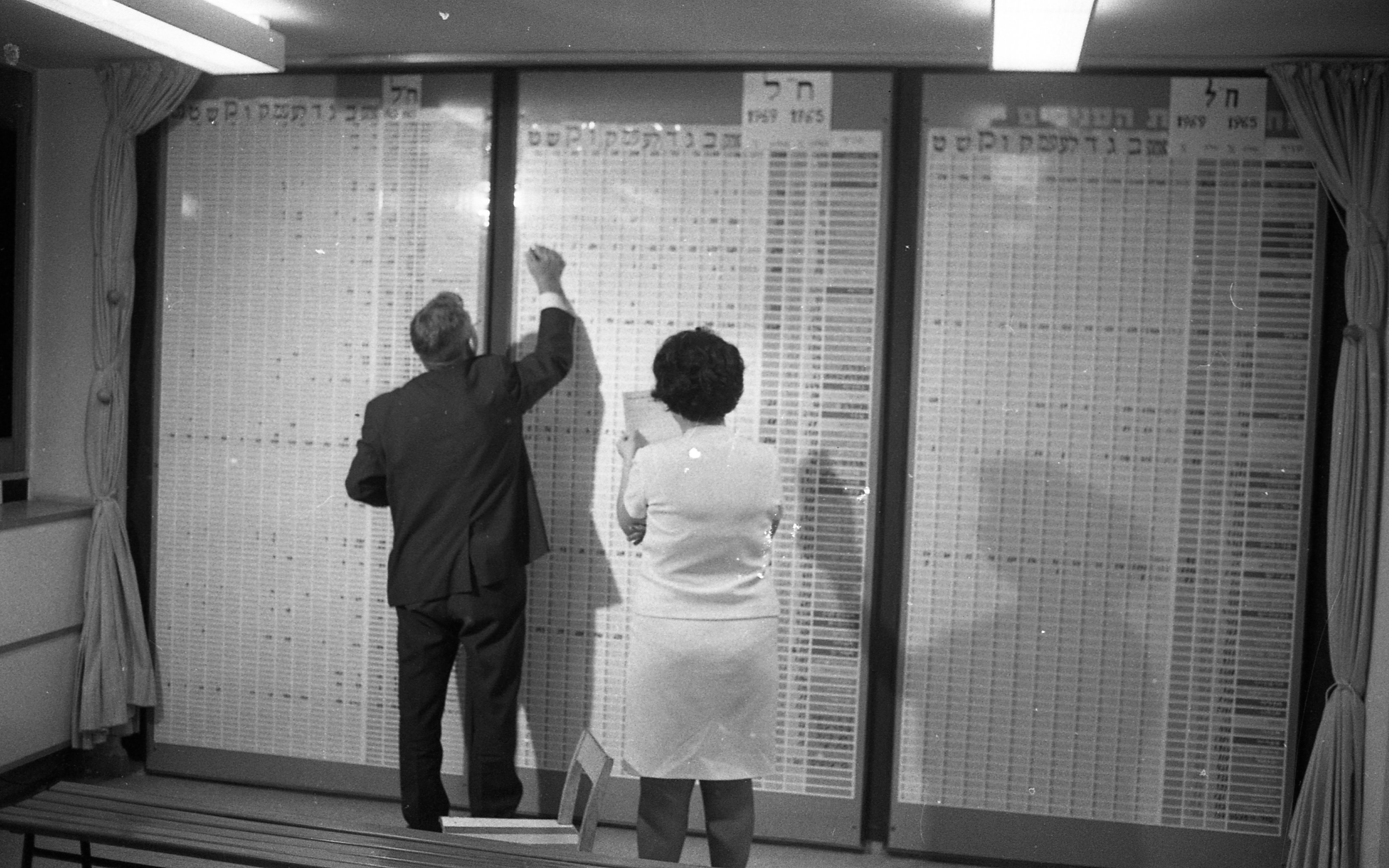
Counting of the election results

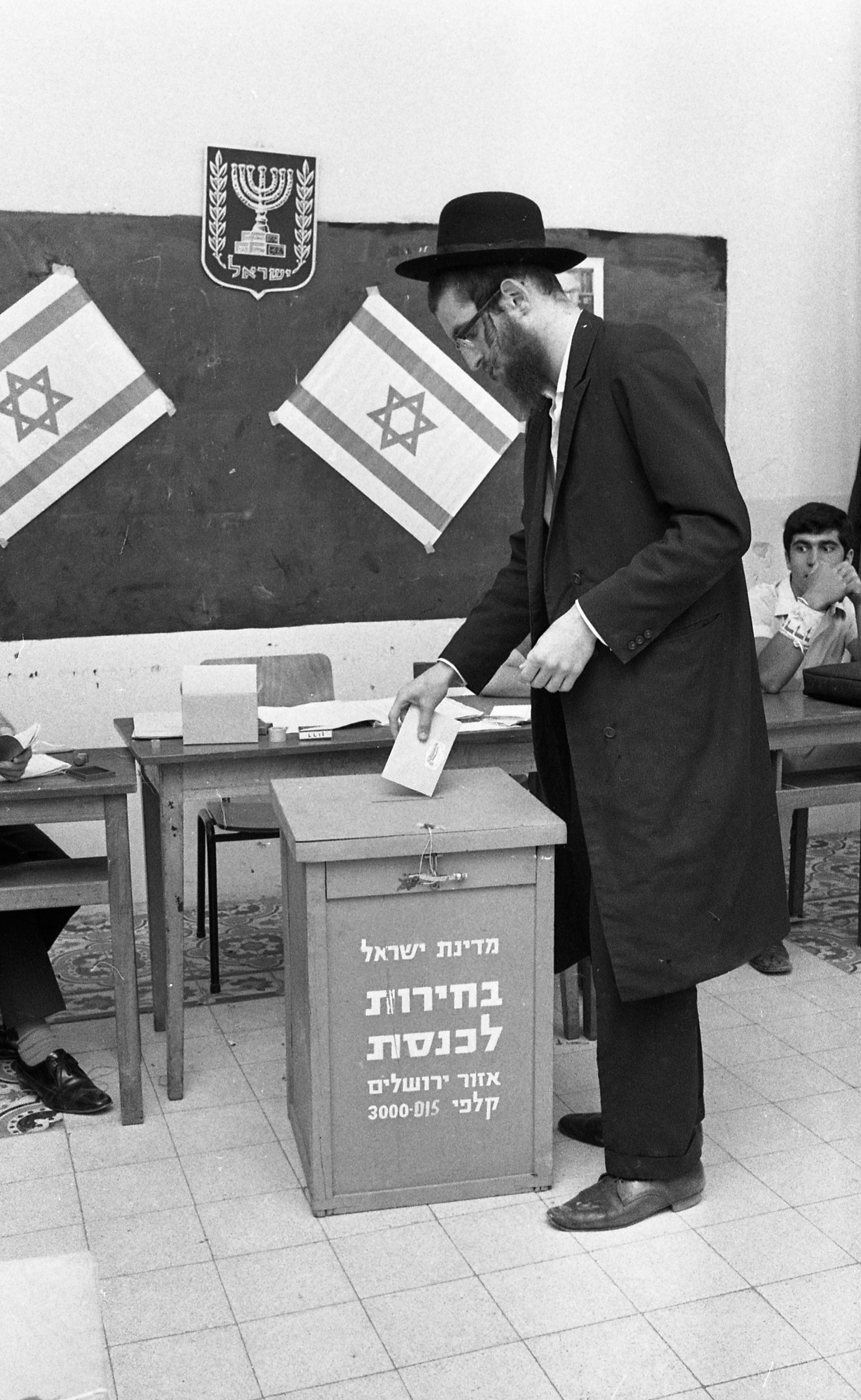
A voter in the elections

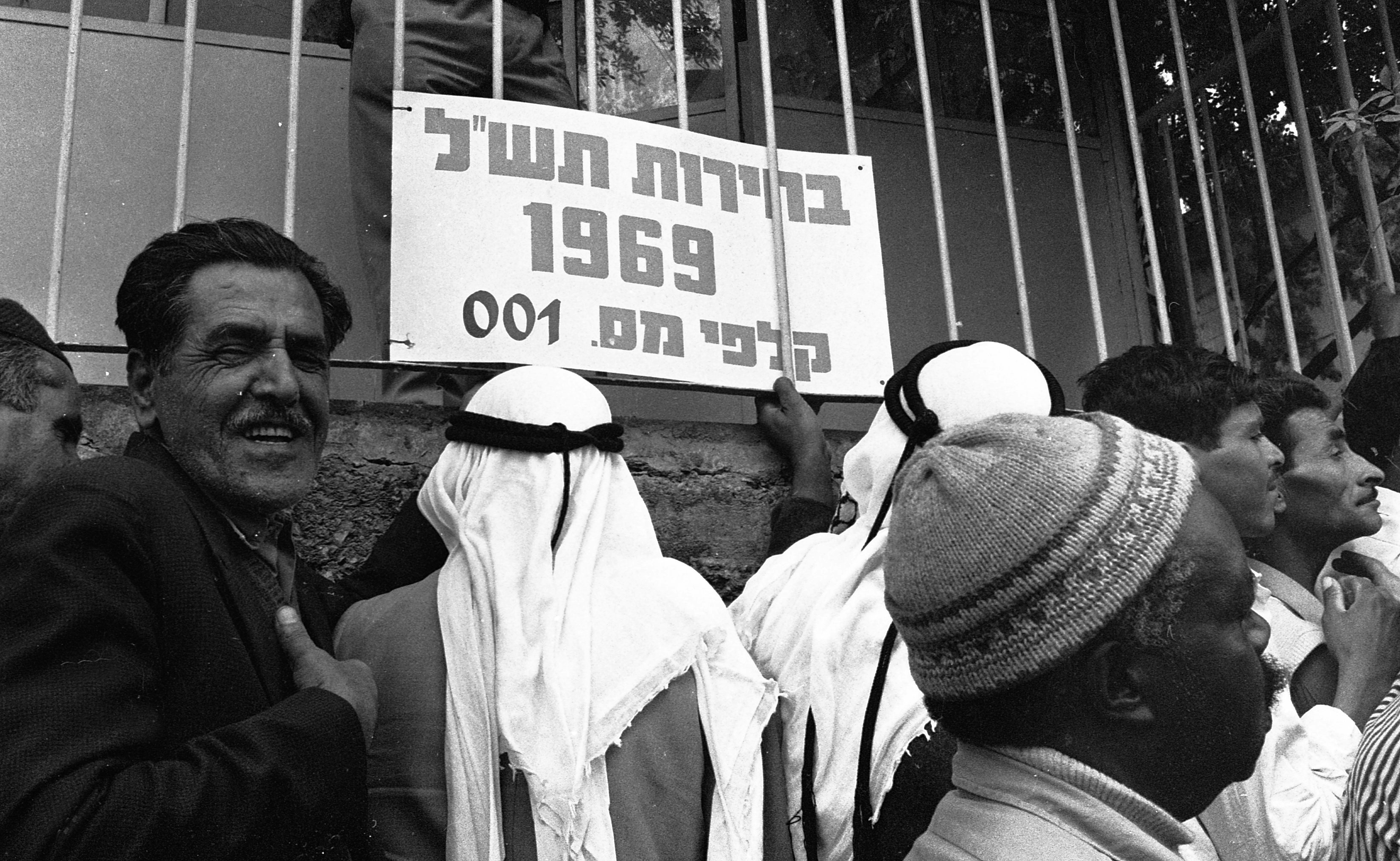
Entrance to a voting booth for the municipal elections, which were held simultaneously

Legislative elections were held in Israel on 28 October 1969 to elect members of the seventh Knesset. The ruling Alignment coalition was returned to power with the largest number of seats ever won in an Israeli election (56 out of 120). This was attributed to the government's popularity following the country's victory in the Six-Day War, and that the Alignment had been formed by an alliance of the four most popular left-wing parties, who between them had received 51% of the vote in the previous elections in 1965. As a result, Golda Meir remained Prime Minister. Voter turnout was 82%.

== Parliament factions ==
The table below lists the parliamentary factions represented in the 6th Knesset.

Name	Ideology	Symbol	Leader	1965 result		Seats at 1968 dissolution
Name	Ideology	Symbol	Leader	Votes (%)	Seats	Seats at 1968 dissolution
Labor	Social democracy Labor Zionism	את	Golda Meir	36.7%	45 / 120	54 / 120
Gahal	National liberalism	חל	Menachem Begin	21.3%	26 / 120	20 / 120
Mafdal	Religious Zionism	ב	Haim-Moshe Shapira	8.9%	11 / 120	11 / 120
Rafi	Social democracy	כא	Moshe Dayan	7.9%	10 / 120	0 / 120
Mapam	Labor Zionism; Socialism	מ	Meir Ya'ari	6.6%	8 / 120	8 / 120
Free Centre	Liberalism	ט	Shmuel Tamir	-	0 / 120	6 / 120
Independent Liberals	Liberalism	לע	Moshe Kol	3.8%	5 / 120	5 / 120
Agudat Yisrael	Religious conservatism	ג	Yitzhak-Meir Levin	3.3%	4 / 120	4 / 120
Rakah	Communism; Socialism	ו	Meir Vilner	2.3%	3 / 120	3 / 120
Poalei Agudat Yisrael	Religious conservatism	ד	Kalman Kahana	1.9%	2 / 120	2 / 120
Progress and Development	Arab satellite list	רא	Seif el-Din el-Zoubi	1.8%	2 / 120	2 / 120
Arab List for Bedouin and Villagers	Arab satellite list	יא	Diyab Obeid	1.3%	2 / 120	2 / 120
HaOlam HaZeh	Progressivism	ש	Uri Avnery	1.2%	1 / 120	1 / 120
Maki	Communism; Socialism	ק	Shmuel Mikunis	1.1%	1 / 120	1 / 120
National List	Social liberalism	עמ	David Ben-Gurion	-	0 / 120	1 / 120

== Results ==
Party	Votes	%	Seats	+/–
Alignment	632,035	46.21	56	−7
Gahal	296,294	21.66	26	0
National Religious Party	133,238	9.74	12	1
Agudat Yisrael	44,002	3.22	4	0
Independent Liberals	43,933	3.21	4	−1
National List	42,654	3.12	4	New
Rakah	38,827	2.84	3	0
Progress and Development	28,046	2.05	2	0
Poalei Agudat Yisrael	24,968	1.83	2	0
Cooperation and Brotherhood	19,943	1.46	2	0
HaOlam HaZeh – Koah Hadash	16,853	1.23	2	1
Free Centre	16,393	1.20	2	New
Maki	15,712	1.15	1	0
List for the Land of Israel	7,591	0.56	0	New
Peace List	5,138	0.38	0	0
Young Israel	2,116	0.15	0	0
Total	1,367,743	100.00	120	0
Valid votes	1,367,743	95.78		
Invalid/blank votes	60,238	4.22		
Total votes	1,427,981	100.00		
Registered voters/turnout	1,748,710	81.66		
Source: Israel Democracy Institute

== Aftermath ==
Golda Meir of the Alignment formed the fifteenth government, a national unity government including Gahal, the National Religious Party, the Independent Liberals, Progress and Development and Cooperation and Brotherhood. There were 24 ministers. Gahal resigned from the coalition on 6 August 1970 after the government had decided to adopt the Rogers Plan.

The seventh Knesset was one of the most stable, with only three MKs changing parties; Meir Avizohar left the National List in 1972 to sit as an independent, before joining the Alignment the following year; Avner Shaki left the National Religious Party in 1972 and sat as an independent; and Shalom Cohen left HaOlam HaZeh – Koah Hadash in 1972.
