= List of members of the third Knesset =

The 120 members of the third Knesset were elected on 26 July 1955. The breakdown by party was as follows:

- Mapai: 40
- Herut: 15
- General Zionists: 13
- National Religious Party: 11
- Ahdut HaAvoda: 10
- Mapam: 9
- Religious Torah Front: 6
- Maki: 6
- Progressive Party: 5
- Democratic List for Israeli Arabs: 2
- Progress and Work: 2
- Agriculture and Development: 1

== List of members ==
Member	Party	Notes
Aharon Becker	Mapai	
Aharon Remez	Mapai	
Akiva Govrin	Mapai	
Ami Assaf	Mapai	
Aryeh Bahir	Mapai	
Avraham Herzfeld	Mapai	
Baruch Osnia	Mapai	
Beba Idelson	Mapai	
Bechor-Shalom Sheetrit	Mapai	
Berl Locker	Mapai	
David Ben-Gurion	Mapai	
David Hacohen	Mapai	
David Livschitz	Mapai	
Dvora Netzer	Mapai	
Dov Yosef	Mapai	
Ehud Avriel	Mapai	
Golda Meir	Mapai	
Herzl Berger	Mapai	
Yisrael Guri	Mapai	
Yosef Almogi	Mapai	
Yosef Sprinzak	Mapai	
Kadish Luz	Mapai	
Levi Eshkol	Mapai	
Meir Argov	Mapai	
Mordechai Namir	Mapai	
Moshe Sharett	Mapai	
Peretz Naftali	Mapai	
Pinhas Lavon	Mapai	
Rachel Tzabari	Mapai	
Sarah Kafrit	Mapai	
Senetta Yoseftal	Mapai	
Shlomo Hillel	Mapai	
Shmuel Dayan	Mapai	
Shmuel Shoresh	Mapai	
Zalman Shazar	Mapai	
Ya'akov Shimshon Shapira	Mapai	
Yisrael Yeshayahu	Mapai	
Yona Kesse	Mapai	
Yosef Efrati	Mapai	
Zalman Aran	Mapai	
Aryeh Altman	Herut	
Aryeh Ben-Eliezer	Herut	
Binyamin Arditi	Herut	
Binyamin Avniel	Herut	
Eliezer Shostak	Herut	
Esther Raziel-Naor	Herut	
Haim Cohen-Meguri	Herut	
Haim Landau	Herut	
Menachem Begin	Herut	
Mordechai Olmert	Herut	
Nahum Levin	Herut	
Shimshon Unichman	Herut	
Ya'akov Meridor	Herut	
Yohanan Bader	Herut	
Yosef Shofman	Herut	
Ben-Zion Harel	General Zionists	
Haim Ariav	General Zionists	
Elimelekh Rimalt	General Zionists	
Ezra Ichilov	General Zionists	
Israel Rokach	General Zionists	
Peretz Bernstein	General Zionists	
Shimon Bejarano	General Zionists	
Shlomo Perlstein	General Zionists	
Shoshana Parsitz	General Zionists	
Simha Babah	General Zionists	
Yosef Sapir	General Zionists	
Yosef Serlin	General Zionists	
Zalman Suzayiv	General Zionists	
Aharon-Ya'akov Greenberg	National Religious Party	
Frija Zoaretz	National Religious Party	
Haim-Moshe Shapira	National Religious Party	
Michael Hasani	National Religious Party	
Mordechai Nurock	National Religious Party	
Moshe Kelmer	National Religious Party	
Moshe Unna	National Religious Party	
Shlomo-Yisrael Ben-Meir	National Religious Party	
Yitzhak Rafael	National Religious Party	
Yosef Burg	National Religious Party	
Zerach Warhaftig	National Religious Party	
Avraham Abaas	Ahdut HaAvoda	
Yisrael Bar-Yehuda	Ahdut HaAvoda	
Yisrael Galili	Ahdut HaAvoda	
Moshe Aram	Ahdut HaAvoda	
Tzipora Laskov	Ahdut HaAvoda	
Ruth Haktin	Ahdut HaAvoda	
Yigal Allon	Ahdut HaAvoda	
Yitzhak Ben-Aharon	Ahdut HaAvoda	
Yitzhak Tabenkin	Ahdut HaAvoda	
Ze'ev Tzur	Ahdut HaAvoda	
Emma Talmi	Mapam	
Haim Yehuda	Mapam	
Hanan Rubin	Mapam	
Yisrael Barzilai	Mapam	
Yitzhak Yitzhaky	Mapam	
Meir Ya'ari	Mapam	
Mordechai Bentov	Mapam	
Ya'akov Hazan	Mapam	
Ya'akov Riftin	Mapam	
Binyamin Mintz	Religious Torah Front	
Kalman Kahana	Religious Torah Front	
Shlomo Lorincz	Religious Torah Front	
Ya'akov Katz	Religious Torah Front	
Yitzhak-Meir Levin	Religious Torah Front	
Zalman Ben-Ya'akov	Religious Torah Front	
Emile Habibi	Maki	
Esther Vilenska	Maki	
Meir Vilner	Maki	
Moshe Sneh	Maki	
Shmuel Mikunis	Maki	
Tawfik Toubi	Maki	
Gershom Shoken	Progressive Party	
Idov Cohen	Progressive Party	
Pinchas Rosen	Progressive Party	
Yeshayahu Forder	Progressive Party	
Yizhar Harari	Progressive Party	
Masaad Kassis	Democratic List for Israeli Arabs	
Seif el-Din el-Zubi	Democratic List for Israeli Arabs	
Salah-Hassan Hanifes	Progress and Work	
Saleh Suleiman	Progress and Work	
Faras Hamdan	Agriculture and Development	

=== Replacements ===
MK	Replaced	Party	Date	Notes
Yussuf Hamis	Yitzhak Yitzhaky	Mapam	21 September 1955	
Tzipora Laskov	Nahum Nir	Ahdut HaAvoda	12 October 1955	
Ya'akov Nitzani	Ya'akov Shimshon Shapira	Mapai	14 November 1955	
Jabr Muadi	Seif el-Din el-Zubi	Democratic List for Israeli Arabs	13 February 1956	
Yizhar Smilansky	Aharon Becker	Mapai	1 October 1956	
Yisrael Kargman	Zalman Shazar	Mapai	8 October 1956	
David Bar-Rav-Hai	Senetta Yoseftal	Mapai	24 October 1956	
Ya'akov Klivnov	Haim Ariav	General Zionists	16 June 1957	
Hannah Lamdan	Ehud Avriel	Mapai	31 July 1957	
Yohanan Cohen	Yeshayahu Forder	Progressive Party	28 October 1957	
Amos Degani	Aharon Remez	Mapai	19 December 1957	
Moshe Carmel	Yitzhak Tabenkin	Ahdut HaAvoda	9 June 1958	
Yerahmiel Assa	Avraham Abaas	Ahdut HaAvoda	17 September 1958	
Haim Zadok	Yosef Sprinzak	Mapai	28 January 1959	
Shlomo-Ya'akov Gross	Zalman Ben-Ya'akov	Religious Torah Front	2 March 1959	
Jenia Tversky	Shlomo Hillel	Mapai	6 July 1959	
