= Third government of Israel =

1951–52 government led by David Ben-Gurion

Third Ben-Gurion Cabinet
- 3rd Cabinet of Israel

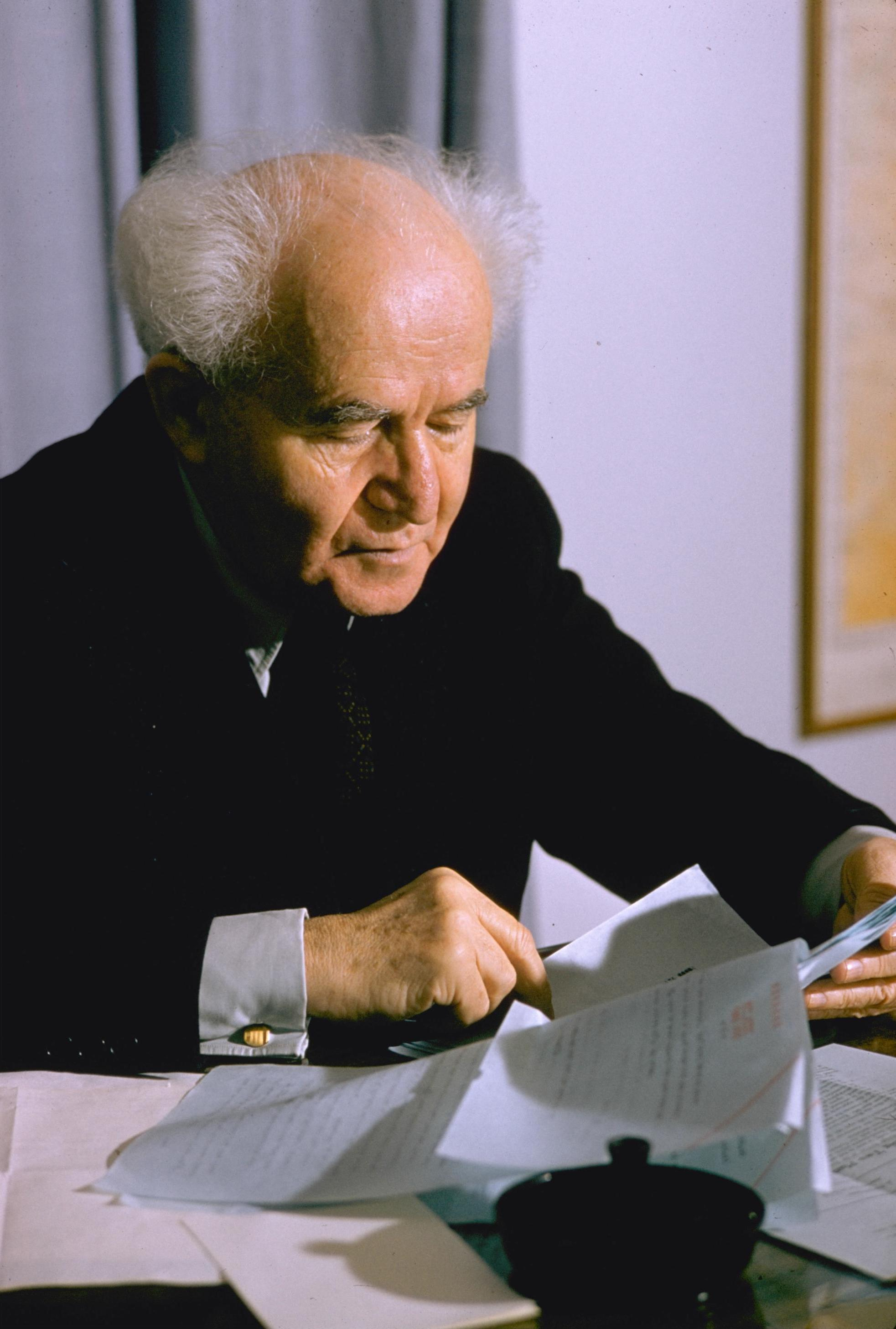
- Date formed: 8 October 1951
- Date dissolved: 24 December 1952

People and organisations
- Head of state: Chaim Weizmann (until 9 November 1952); Yitzhak Ben-Zvi (from 16 December 1952)
- Head of government: David Ben-Gurion
- Member parties: Mapai; Hapoel HaMizrachi; Mizrachi; Agudat Yisrael; Poalei Agudat Yisrael; Democratic List for Israeli Arabs; Progress and Work; Agriculture and Development
- Status in legislature: Coalition
- Opposition leader: Peretz Bernstein

History
- Election: 1951 Israeli legislative election
- Legislature term: 2nd Knesset
- Predecessor: 2nd cabinet of Israel
- Successor: 4th cabinet of Israel

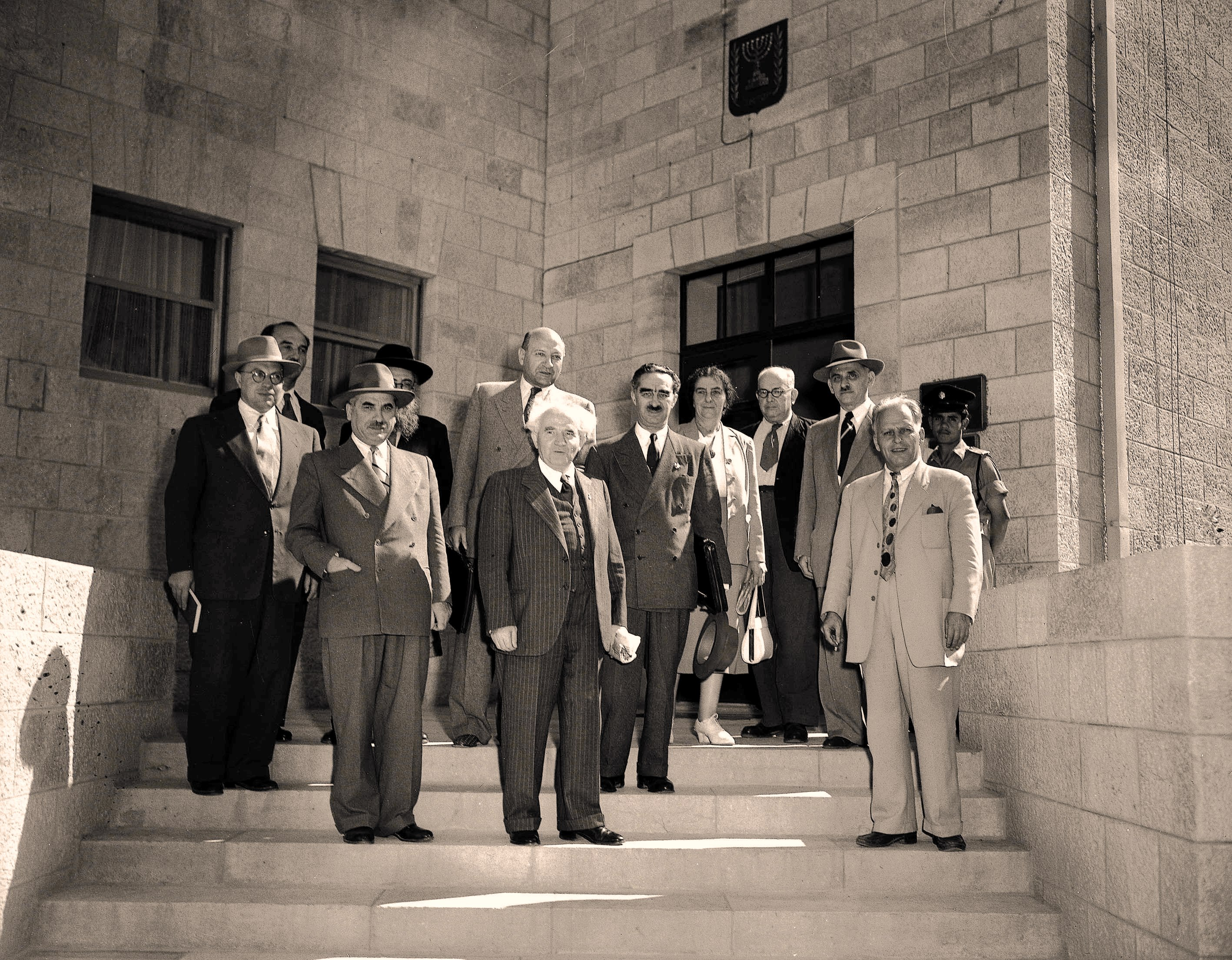
Cabinet ministers leaving Prime Minister's office after the first session of Israel's 3rd Government

The third government of Israel was formed by David Ben-Gurion on 8 October 1951, more than two months after the elections. His Mapai party formed a coalition with Mizrachi, Hapoel HaMizrachi, Agudat Yisrael, Poalei Agudat Yisrael and the three Israeli Arab parties, the Democratic List for Israeli Arabs, Progress and Work and Agriculture and Development. There were 15 ministers.

Agudat Yisrael and Poalei Agudat Yisrael left the coalition on 23 September 1952 (though Kalman Kahana remained a deputy minister) shortly after disagreements over the conscription of women into the IDF. This left the government with only 60 of the 120 seats in the Knesset.

The government resigned on 19 December 1952 due to a dispute with the religious parties over religious education.

Two ministers, Eliezer Kaplan and David-Zvi Pinkas died in office.

Third government of Israel
Portfolio	Minister	Party
Prime Minister; Minister of Defense	David Ben-Gurion	Mapai
Deputy Prime Minister	Eliezer Kaplan (8 October 1951 – 13 July 1952) (Note: Died in office)	Mapai
Minister of Agriculture	Levi Eshkol (8 October 1951 – 25 June 1952)	Mapai
Minister of Agriculture	Peretz Naftali (25 June – 24 December 1952)	Mapai
Minister of Education and Culture	Ben-Zion Dinor	Not an MK (Note: Although Dinor was not an MK in the second Knesset, he had been an MK for Mapai in the first Knesset.)
Minister of Finance	Eliezer Kaplan (8 October 1951 – 25 June 1952)	Mapai
Minister of Finance	Levi Eshkol (25 June – 24 December 1952)	Mapai
Minister of Foreign Affairs	Moshe Sharett	Mapai
Minister of Health	Yosef Burg	Hapoel HaMizrachi
Minister of Internal Affairs; Minister of Religions	Haim-Moshe Shapira	Hapoel HaMizrachi
Minister of Justice	Dov Yosef (8 October 1951 – 25 June 1952)	Mapai
Minister of Justice	Haim Cohn (25 June – 24 December 1952)	Not an MK
Minister of Labour	Golda Meir	Mapai
Minister of Police	Bechor-Shalom Sheetrit	Mapai
Minister of Postal Services	Mordechai Nurock	Mizrachi
Minister of Trade and Industry	Dov Yosef	Mapai
Minister of Transportation	David-Zvi Pinkas (8 October 1951 – 14 August 1952)	Mizrachi
Minister of Transportation	David Ben-Gurion (14 August – 24 December 1952)	Mapai
Minister of Welfare	Yitzhak Meir Levin (8 October 1951 – 18 September 1952)	Agudat Yisrael
Minister without Portfolio	Pinhas Lavon (17 August - 24 December 1952)	Mapai
Minister without Portfolio	Peretz Naftali (8 October 1951 – 25 June 1952)	Mapai
Minister without Portfolio	Eliezer Kaplan (25 June - 13 July 1952)	Mapai
Deputy Minister of Agriculture	Yosef Efrati	Mapai
Deputy Minister of Education and Culture	Kalman Kahana	Poalei Agudat Yisrael
