= David Bar-Rav-Hai =

Israeli politician (1894–1977)

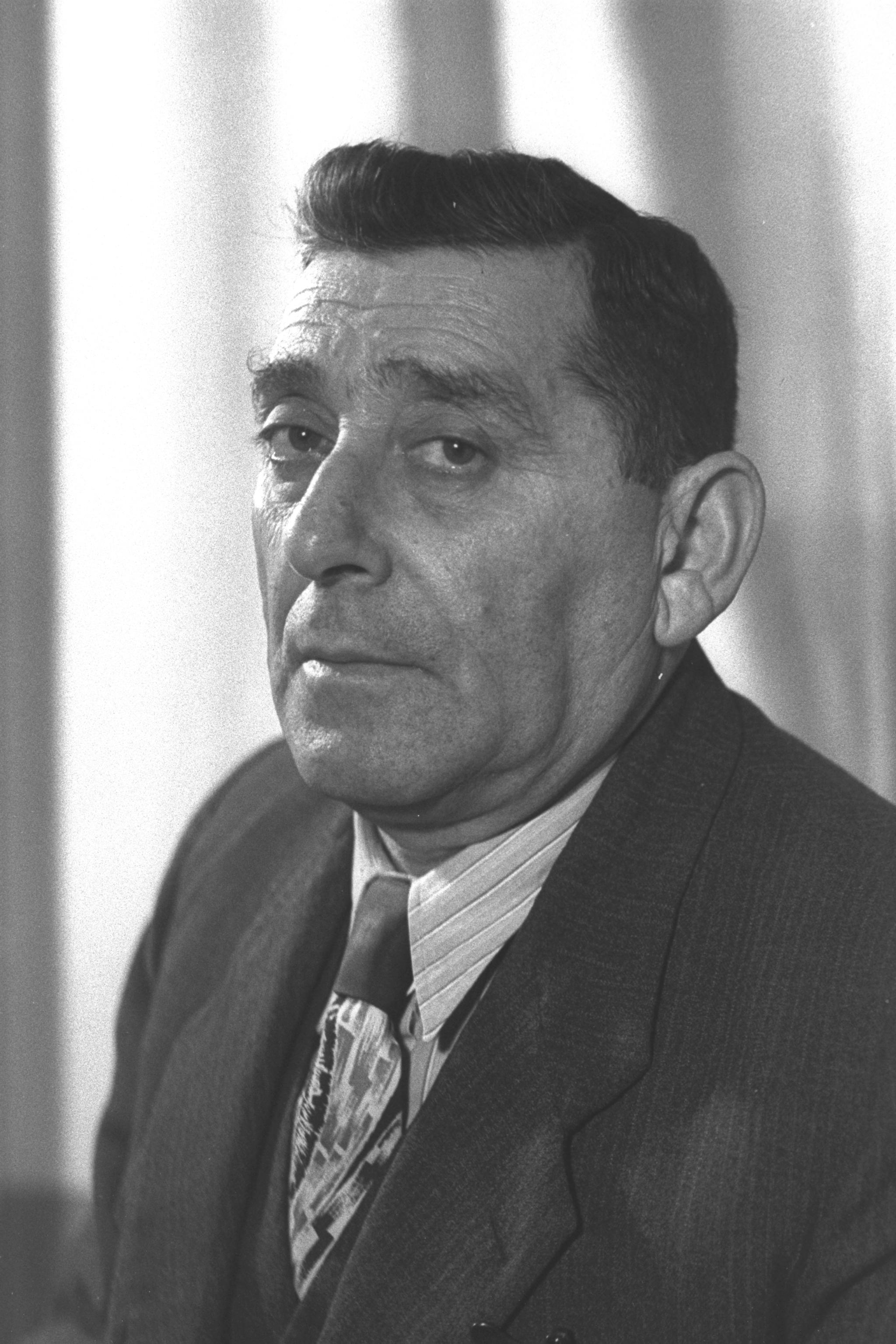
- Bar-Rav-Hai in 1951

Faction represented in the Knesset
- 1949–1955: Mapai
- 1956–1965: Mapai

Personal details
- Born: 11 July 1894 Nizhyn, Russian Empire
- Died: 15 July 1977 (aged 83)

David Bar-Rav-Hai (Hebrew: דָּוִד בַּר־רַב־הָאִי; 11 July 1894 – 15 July 1977) was an Israeli politician who served as a member of the Knesset for Mapai from 1949 until 1955, and again from 1956 until 1965.

== Biography ==
Born David Borovoi in Nizhyn in the Russian Empire (today in Ukraine), Bar-Rav-Hai joined the Zionist Students Organization in Odessa. In 1911, he moved to Germany, but returned to Russia in 1918 and joined the Young Zion movement, becoming secretary of the Jewish community in Odessa until the Soviet authorities closed it down in 1920. Afterwards he joined the Zionist underground and was arrested in 1922. He was sentenced to two years in prison, but was released after 15 months and expelled from the country. In 1924 he emigrated to Mandatory Palestine, where he joined Hapoel Hatzair. He became a member of the workers councils in Haifa and Jerusalem, and was sent to Poland and Romania as an emissary.

In 1933 he established a law office in Haifa. He was joined by his son, Meir, who studied law in the last class under the British Mandate. Between 1932 and 1948 Bar-Rav-Hai was a member of the Jewish National Council, after which he was an alternate member of the Provisional State Council. As chairman of the election committee in October 1948, he wrote that the need to hold elections within a short period of time made it impossible to create voting districts, resulting in the elections being held using proportional representation with a single nationwide constitutuency. He argued in favor of delaying writing a formal constitution and drafting it "step by step...chapter by chapter," with the Israeli Declaration of Independence as its cornerstone.

In the 1949 elections Bar-Rav-Hai won a seat on the Mapai list. He was re-elected in 1951, but lost his seat in the 1955 elections. However, he re-entered the Knesset on 24 October 1956 as a replacement for Senetta Yoseftal. He was re-elected in 1959 and 1961, serving until 1965. He was placed 115th place on the Alignment list in the 1965 elections.

Bar-Rav-Hai died in 1977 at the age of 83. A street in Haifa is named after him.
