= Zalman Ben-Ya'akov =

Israeli politician (1897–1959)

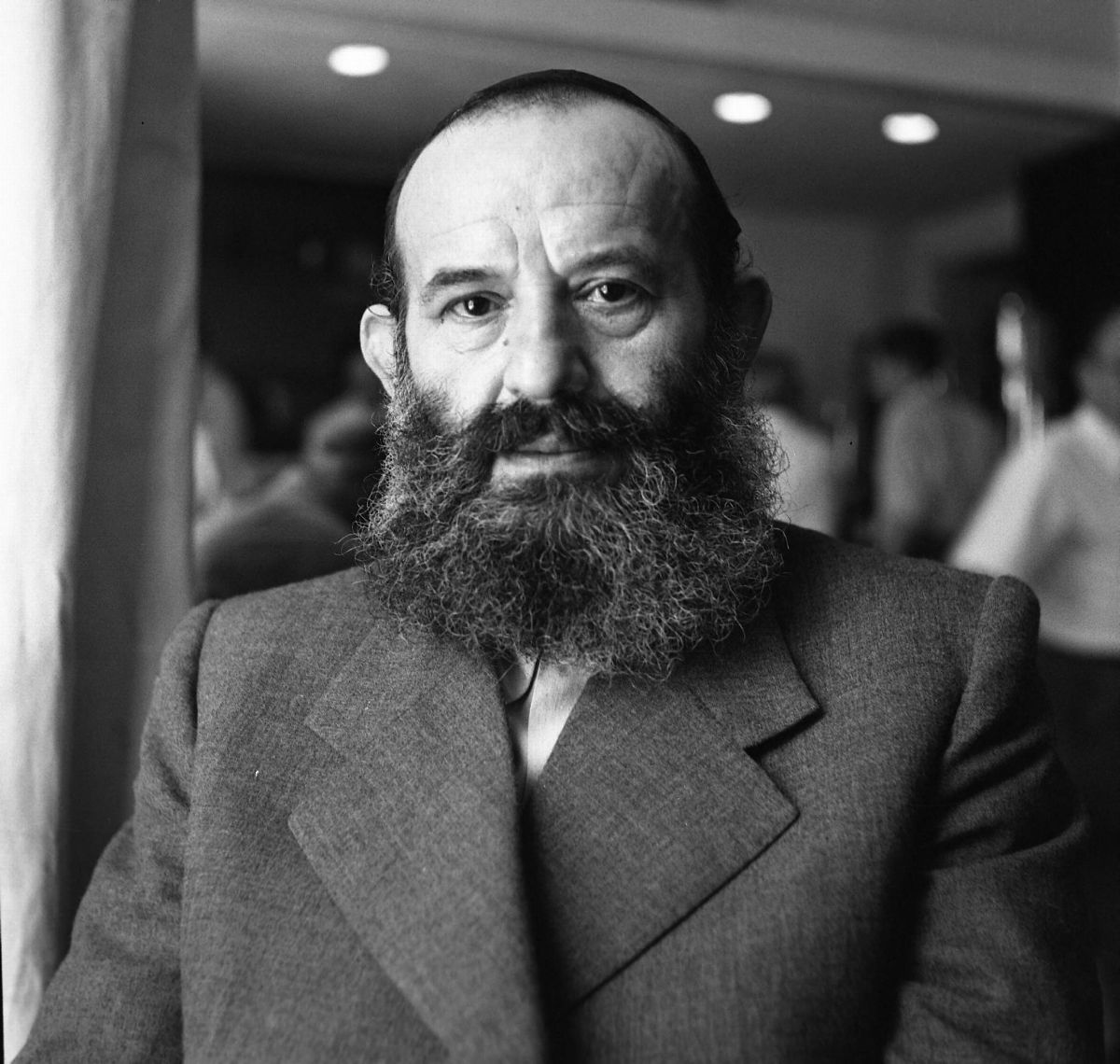
- Ben-Ya'akov in 1953

Faction represented in the Knesset
- 1953–1955: Agudat Yisrael
- 1955–1959: Religious Torah Front

Personal details
- Born: 1897; Sieradz, Russian Empire
- Died: 2 March 1959

Zalman Ben-Ya'akov (Hebrew: זלמן בן-יעקב; 1897 – 2 March 1959) was an Israeli politician who served as a member of the Knesset for Agudat Yisrael and the Religious Torah Front between 1953 and 1959.

== Biography ==
Born Zalman Jankelewicz in Sieradz in the Russian Empire (today in Poland), Ben-Ya'akov was educated at a yeshiva. He was amongst the founders of the Polish branch of Agudat Yisrael, and also helped establish Poalei Agudat Yisrael.

In 1935 he emigrated to Mandatory Palestine, where he headed the Sinai Institution in Tel Aviv and the True Torah organisation in Haifa. One of the heads of Agudat Yisrael's education work, he became a chief inspector of the Ultra-Orthodox education stream.

He was on the Agudat Yisrael list for the 1951 elections, but failed to win a seat. However, he entered the Knesset on 24 June 1953 as a replacement for the deceased Avraham Deutsch. He retained his seat in the 1955 elections, in which Agudat Yisrael ran as part of the Religious Torah Front alliance. He died on 2 March 1959 whilst still a Knesset member. His seat was taken by Shlomo-Ya'akov Gross.

A street in Bnei Brak is named after him.
