= Shlomo-Ya'akov Gross =

Israeli politician (1908–2003)

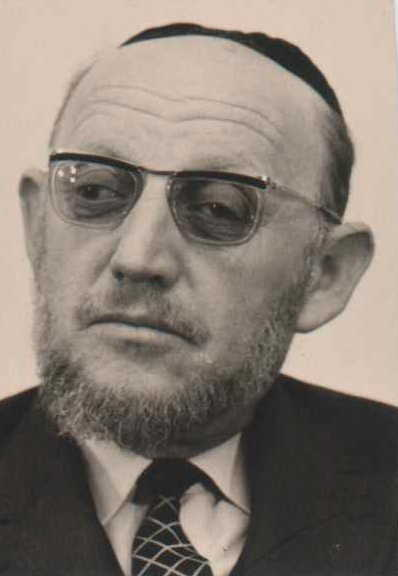

Faction represented in the Knesset
- 1959: Agudat Yisrael-PAI
- 1961: Agudat Yisrael
- 1965–1972: Agudat Yisrael
- 1975–1977: Religious Torah Front
- 1977–1981: Agudat Yisrael

Personal details
- Born: 6 December 1908 Austria-Hungary
- Died: 7 July 2003 (aged 94)

Shlomo-Ya'akov Gross (Hebrew: שְׁלֹמֹה-יַעֲקֹב גְּרוֹס; 6 December 1908 – 7 July 2003) was an Israeli politician who served as a member of the Knesset for Agudat Yisrael and the Religious Torah Front in several spells between 1959 and 1981.

== Biography ==
Born in the Hungarian part of Austria-Hungary, Gross was educated at a heder and yeshivas, and was a member of Young Agudat Yisrael in Translyvania, later becoming the secretary of the Transylvanian branch of Agudat Yisrael. During World War II he was imprisoned in a forced labour camp, and his wife and two children were killed in Auschwitz. After his camp was liberated by the Red Army, he and some friends established an absorption centre for Holocaust orphans and orphans of the Theresienstadt concentration camp expulsion.

In 1950 he emigrated to Israel, where he worked for the Central Bureau of Statistics. He was on the Religious Torah Front list (an alliance of Agudat Yisrael and Poalei Agudat Yisrael) for the 1955 elections, but failed to win a seat. However, he entered the Knesset on 2 March 1959 as a replacement for the deceased Zalman Ben-Ya'akov. Although he lost his seat in the November 1959 elections, he returned to the Knesset as a replacement for the deceased Binyamin Mintz on 30 May 1961. He retained his seat in elections in 1961, 1965 and 1969, but resigned his seat on 27 November 1972, and was replaced by Ya'akov Mizrahi.

Gross was given a place on the Religious Torah Front for the 1973 elections, but failed to win a seat. However, he returned to the Knesset again on 23 November 1975 as a replacement for Menachem Porush. He went on to retain his seat in the 1977 elections, but lost it for a final time in the 1981 elections. During his tenure in the Knesset, he was involved in trying to eliminate the court oath and to save moshav Kfar Gidon from collapse.

He died in 2003 at the age of 94.
