= Menachem Porush =

Israeli politician (1916–2010)

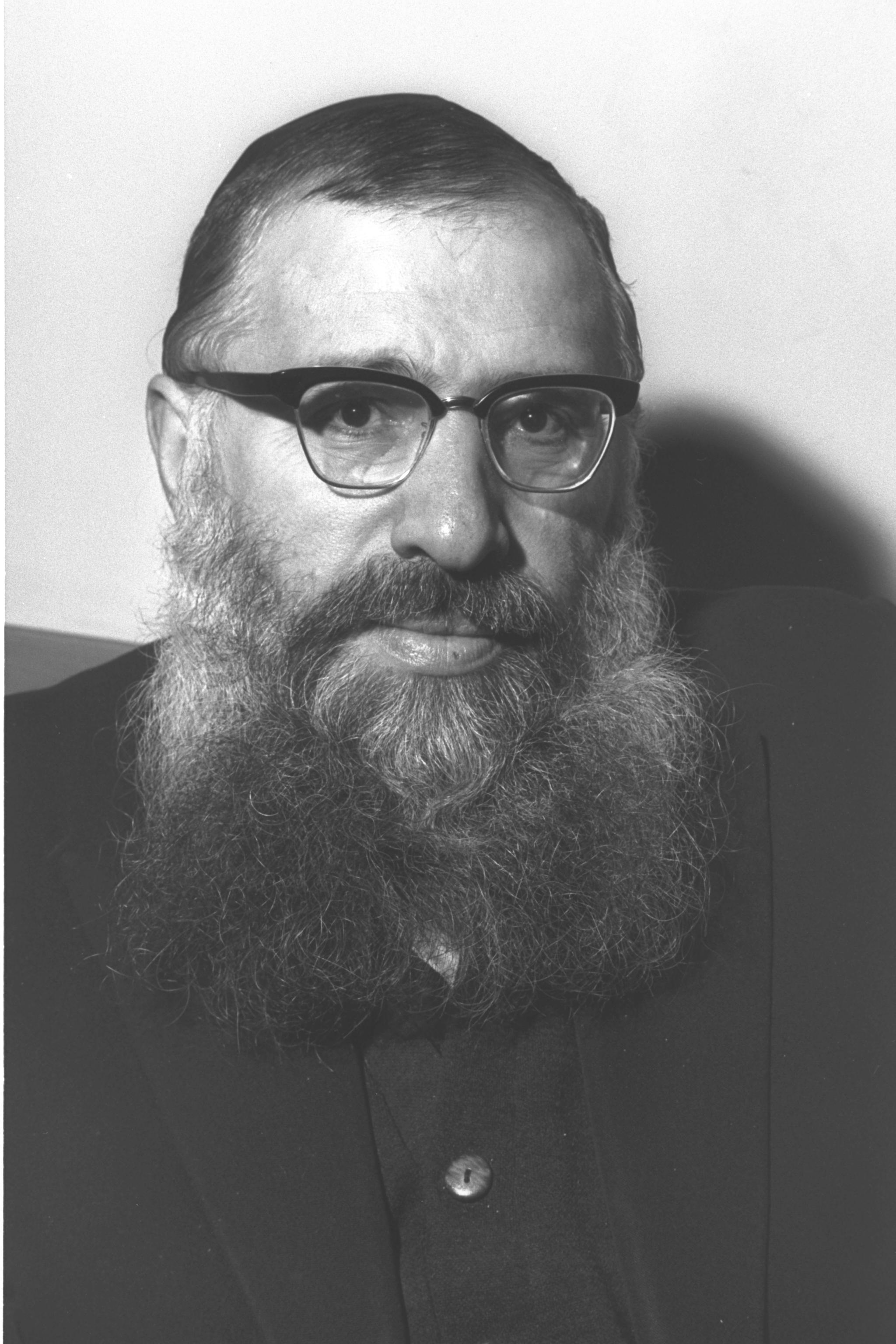

Faction represented in the Knesset
- 1959–1960: Religious Torah Front
- 1960–1974: Agudat Yisrael
- 1974–1975: Religious Torah Front
- 1977–1992: Agudat Yisrael
- 1992–1994: United Torah Judaism

Personal details
- Born: 2 April 1916 Jerusalem, Ottoman Empire
- Died: 22 February 2010 (aged 93) Jerusalem, Israel
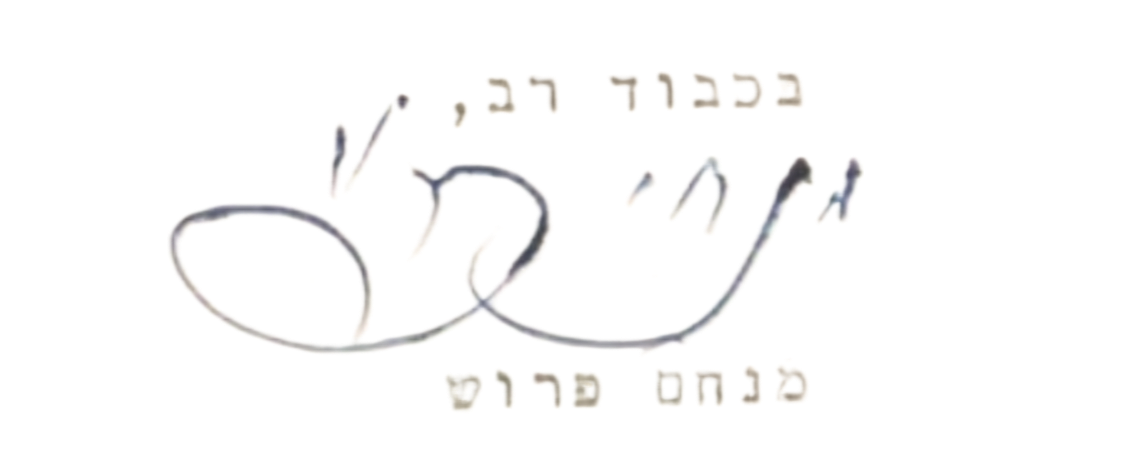
- Signature

Menachem Porush (Hebrew: מנחם פרוש; 2 April 1916 – 22 February 2010) was an Israeli politician who served as a member of the Knesset for Agudat Yisrael and its alliances between 1959 and 1975, and again from 1977 until 1994.

== Biography ==
=== Early life ===
Porush, a seventh-generation Jerusalemite, was born in Jerusalem in 1916 to Rabbi Moshe Glickman-Porush, and studied at the Etz Chaim Yeshiva. In 1932 he was expelled from Etz Chaim for unseemly conduct at a Purim party, where he allegedly slighted chief rabbi Abraham Isaac Kook. (He later stated that he did not know ahead of time that Rabbi Kook would be denigrated in the Purim play.) After that he went abroad to work as a correspondent for Orthodox Jewish publications, returning in 1938. By 1949, he had become assistant editor of the newspaper Kol Yisrael. In 1954 he became a member of the Agudat Yisrael Center in Israel, and a member of the Executive of the World Agudath Israel. In 1955, he was appointed chairman of the Agudat Yisrael Center in Israel. During this time, Porush also founded Children's Town to promote Jewish education and combat missionary influence.

=== 1959-1994 ===
In 1959, he was elected for the first time to the Knesset on the Religious Torah Front list, an alliance of Agudat Yisrael and Poalei Agudat Yisrael. He was re-elected in 1961, 1965 and 1969. Between 1969 and 1974 he also served as deputy head of the Jerusalem City Council, and in 1973 he established Kiryat HaYeled, an educational center for Haredi children.

Although he retained his seat in the 1973 elections, he resigned from the Knesset on 23 November 1975, and was replaced by Shlomo-Ya'akov Gross. He returned to the Knesset following the 1977 elections, and was re-elected in 1981 and 1984. The same year, Porush defied the Gerrer Rebbe and Council of Torah Sages, who demanded he give up his Knesset seat. In response, dozens of Gerrer Hasidim stormed into his hotel, beat him up and destroyed the place. He commented that the event reminded him of the 1929 riots.

On 29 September 1984 he was appointed Deputy Minister of Labor and Social Welfare, a post he held until 2 December the following year. After re-election in 1988, he was re-appointed to the post on 19 November 1990. He retained his seat in the 1992 elections, but resigned from the Knesset for a second and final time on 28 June 1994, and was replaced by Avraham Verdiger.

=== Personal ===
His son, Meir Porush, followed him into politics as a member of the Jerusalem City Council and the Knesset for United Torah Judaism.

Porush was a longtime op-ed columnist for the Brooklyn-based Jewish Press weekly newspaper.
