= Perlstein =

Perlstein is a surname. Notable people with the surname include:

- Rick Perlstein (born 1969), American historian and journalist
- Shlomo Perlstein (1902–1979), Israeli politician

== See also ==
- Helen Perlstein Pollard (born 1946), American academic ethnohistorian and archaeologist
- Arnold Perlstein, character in The Magic School Bus
