= Shlomo Lorincz =

Israeli politician

- שלמה לורינץ
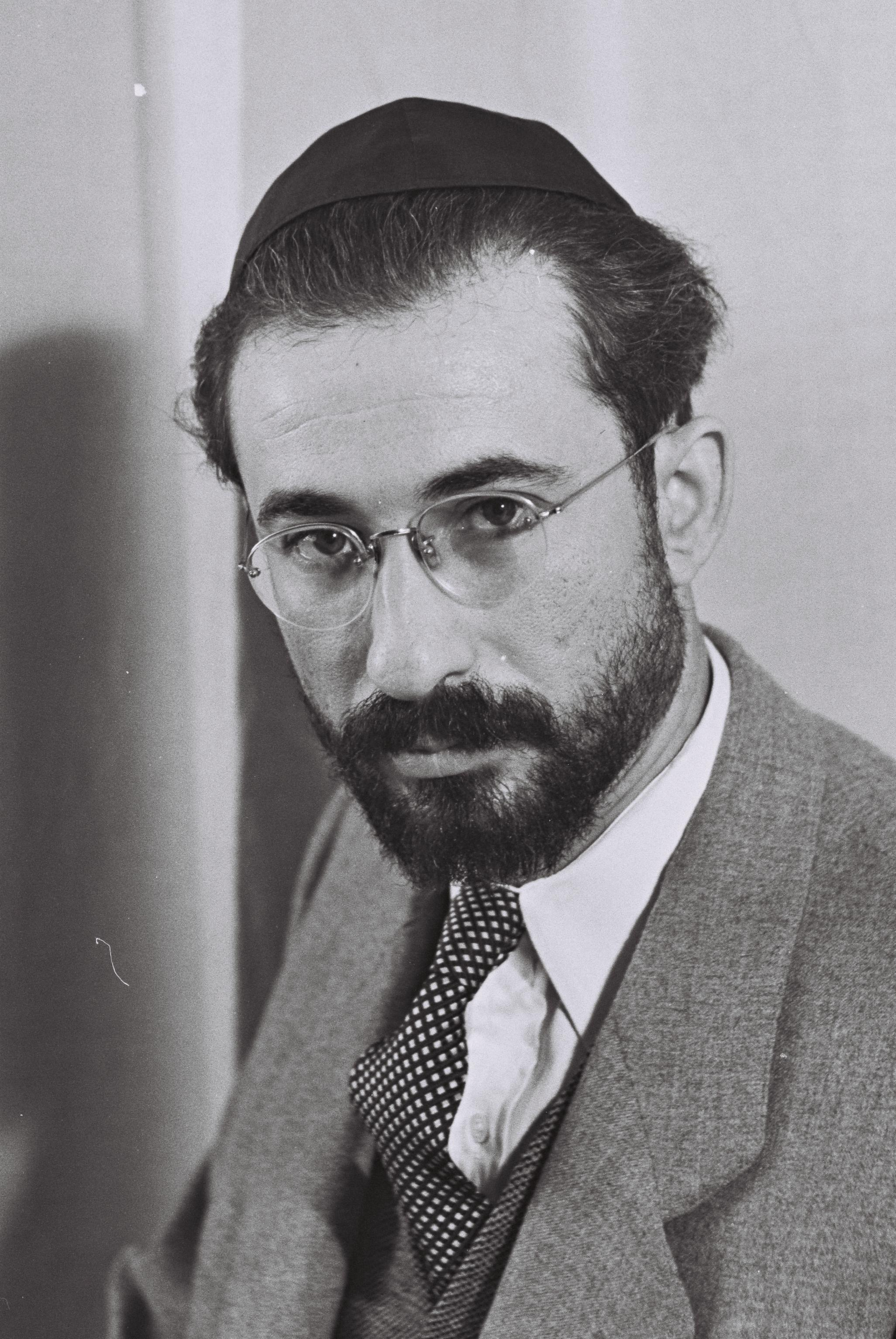

Faction represented in the Knesset
- 1951–1955: Agudat Yisrael
- 1955–1960: Religious Torah Front
- 1960–1974: Agudat Yisrael
- 1974–1977: Religious Torah Front
- 1977–1984: Agudat Yisrael

Personal details
- Born: 5 March 1918 Budapest, Hungary
- Died: 19 October 2009 (aged 91)

Rabbi Shlomo Lorincz (Hebrew: שלמה לורינץ; 5 March 1918 – 19 October 2009) was an Israeli politician who served as a member of the Knesset for Agudat Yisrael from 1951 until 1984, and a close confidant of many gedolim.

== Biography ==
Born in Budapest, between 1933 and 1935, he studied with Rabbi Yaakov Yechezkiya Greenwald at the Papa Yeshiva in Hungary. In late 1935, he went to Poland to study at the Mir Yeshiva. He then returned to Hungary and from there Lorincz made aliyah to Mandatory Palestine in 1939, and was involved in illegal immigration of Jews from Hungary. In his youth, he was involved in the radical underground organisation Brit HaKanaim, which sought to establish a Halakhic state in Israel by imposing Jewish religious law in the country. In 1949, he was amongst the founders of moshav Komemiyut, and later helped found two youth villages: Sde Hemed (now a moshav) and Hazon Yehezkel (now named Aluma). In 1956, he helped found the Housing and Development company of Agudat Yisrael.

He was first elected to the Knesset in 1951 on the Agudat Yisrael list. He was re-elected in 1955 as part of the Religious Torah Front list (an alliance of Agudat Yisrael and Poalei Agudat Yisrael). He was re-elected again in 1959, 1961, 1965, 1969, 1973, 1977, and 1981. Between 1974 and 1984 he chaired the Finance Committee. Much Israeli paper currency bears his signature.

As a young man, Rabbi Lorincz became a close confidant to some of the generation's most prominent Torah personalities, including the Chazon Ish, Rav Shach, and the Brisker Rov. He later compiled memoirs of these times in his book, B'Mechitzasam.

== External sources ==
- Shlomo Lorincz on the Knesset website
