= Masaad Kassis =

Israeli Arab politician (1918-1989)

- مسعد قسيس
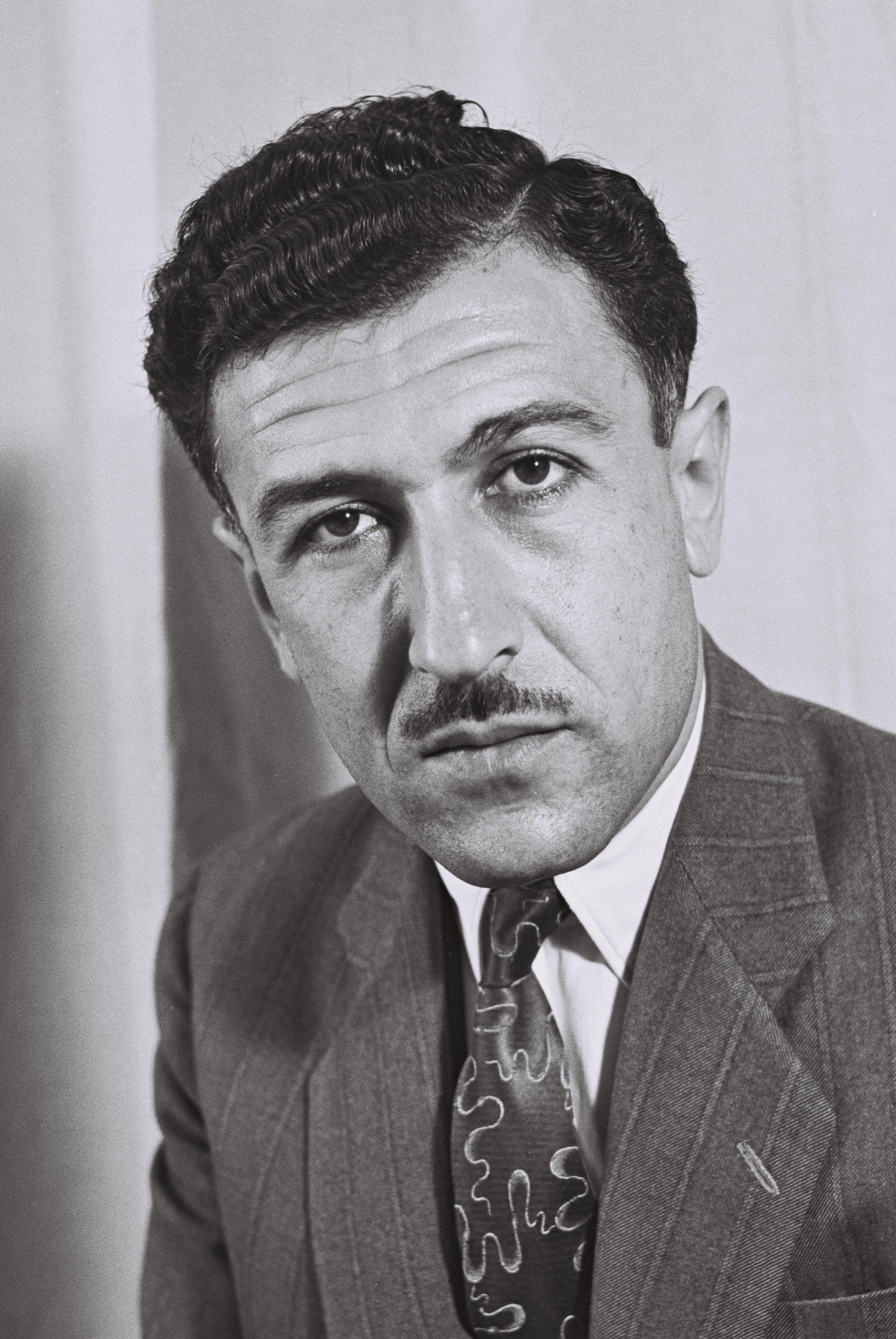
- Kassis in 1951

Faction represented in the Knesset
- 1951–1959: Democratic List for Israeli Arabs

Personal details
- Born: 1 November 1918 Mi'ilya, Occupied Enemy Territory Administration
- Died: 25 December 1989 (aged 71)

Masaad Kassis (Arabic: مسعد قسيس, Hebrew: מסעד קסיס; 1 November 1918 – 25 December 1989) was an Israeli Arab politician who served as a member of the Knesset for the Democratic List for Israeli Arabs between 1951 and 1959.

== Biography ==
Born in Mi'ilya, Kassis attended Kadoorie Agricultural High School. In 1945 he helped establish the Co-operative Tobacco Marketing Association, and was its secretary. In 1950, he helped found the Co-operative Vegetable Marketing Association together with the Histadrut.

In 1951, he was amongst the founders of the Democratic List for Israeli Arabs, and was elected to the Knesset on its list in the elections that year. He retained his seat in the 1955 elections, but the party did not participate in the 1959 elections. Kassis contested the elections as leader of the Independent Faction for Israeli Arabs, but it failed to win a seat.

In 1969, he became head of Mi'ilya's local council. He died in 1989 at the age of 71.
