= Morasha =

Morasha מורשה
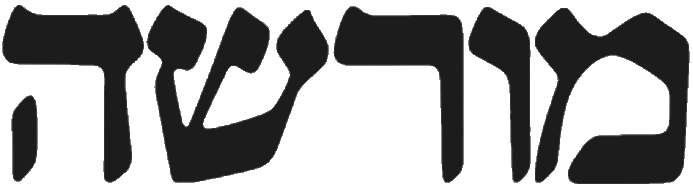
- Leader: Haim Drukman; Avraham Verdiger
- Founded: 1984
- Dissolved: 1988
- Merged into: Agudat Yisrael
- Ideology: Religious conservatism Social conservatism Economic liberalism Fiscal conservatism
- Political position: Right-wing
- Most MKs: 2 (1984–1986)
- Fewest MKs: 1 (1986–1988)

Election symbol
- עד

Morasha (Hebrew: מורשה, lit. 'Heritage'), later known as Morasha-Poalei Agudat Yisrael (מורשה־פועלי אגודת ישראל), was a small, short-lived religious political party in Israel during the 1980s.

== History ==
The Morasha party was formed in the run-up to the 1984 elections by former National Religious Party MK Haim Drukman and Avraham Verdiger, a member of Poalei Agudat Yisrael (which had lost its sole Knesset seat in the 1981 elections). Drukman had attempted to form a Knesset faction by the name of Zionist Religious Camp during the 10th Knesset, but had been refused permission to do so by the House Committee. Other party members included Yitzhak Levy and Hanan Porat.

The party won two seats, taken by Drukman and Verdiger. The party was included in the national unity government led by the Alignment's Shimon Peres, though it did not receive any ministerial positions. However, when Likud's Yitzhak Shamir took over from Peres in 1986, as per the rotation agreement, Morasha were not included in the new government.

On 29 July 1986, Drukman left the party and returned to the National Religious Party. As the sole MK, Verdiger renamed the party Morasha-Poalei Agudat Yisrael. For the 1988 elections, Verdiger re-united with Agudat Yisrael.

== Knesset members ==
Knesset (MKs)	Knesset Members
11 (1984–1988 (2)	Avraham Verdiger, Haim Drukman (left to join the National Religious Party on 29 July 1986)
