= Ruth Haktin =

Israeli politician (1901–1991)

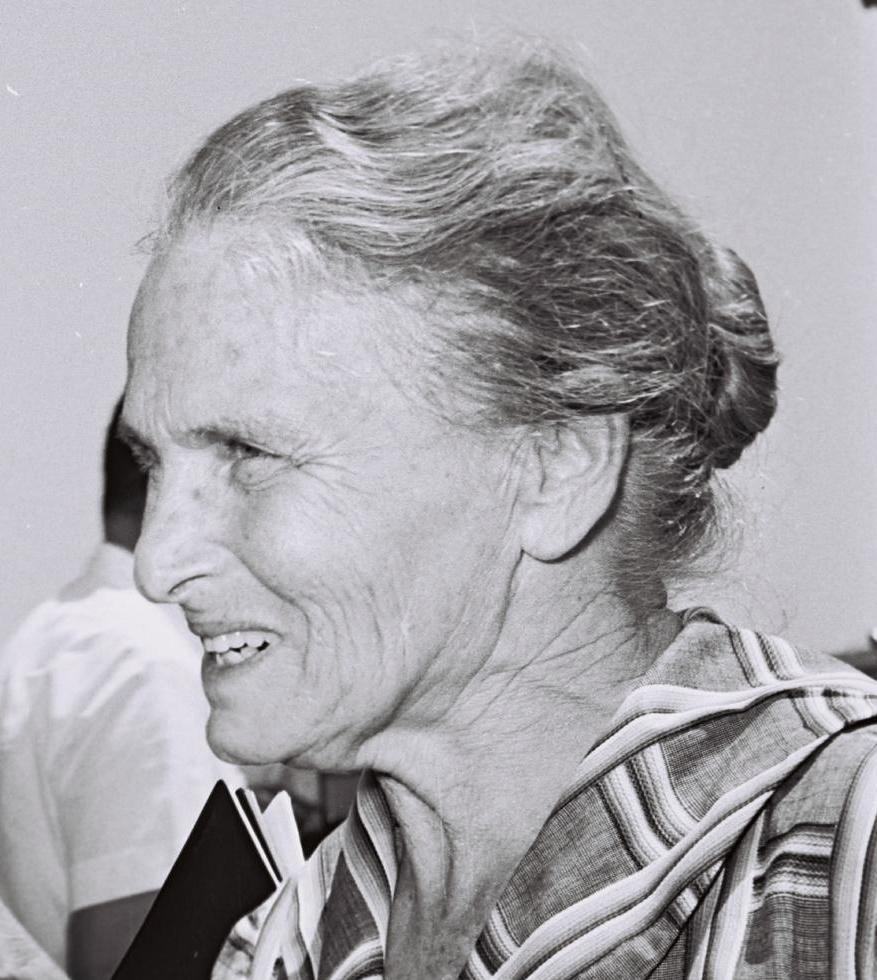
- Hatkin in 1966

Faction represented in the Knesset
- 1955–1959: Ahdut HaAvoda
- 1960–1965: Ahdut HaAvoda
- 1965–1968: Alignment
- 1968–1969: Labor Party
- 1969: Alignment

Personal details
- Born: 18 December 1901 Sosnytsia, Russian Empire
- Died: 14 July 1991 (aged 89)

Ruth Haktin (Hebrew: רות הקטין; 18 December 1901 – 14 July 1991) was an Israeli politician who served as a member of the Knesset from 1955 until 1959, and again from 1960 until 1969.

== Biography ==
Born in Sosnytsia in the Russian Empire (today in Ukraine), Haktin was a member of the Socialist Zionist Party in Russia, before emigrating to Mandatory Palestine in 1923. She settled in kibbutz Tel Yosef, where she lived until the Kibbutz Movement split in 1952, at which point she moved to Ein Harod (Meuhad) which remained in the HaKibbutz HaMeuhad movement.

Following World War II, she travelled to Italy as an emissary for survivors of the Holocaust. She was also a member of the Na'amat central committee and of the central auditing committee of the Histadrut.

In 1955 Haktin was elected to the Knesset on the Ahdut HaAvoda list. Although she lost her seat in the 1959 elections, she returned to the Knesset as a replacement for Yigal Allon on 25 October 1960. She was re-elected in 1961 and 1965, but lost her seat in the 1969 elections.

She died in 1991 at the age of 89 and was buried in kibbutz Hulata next to her grandson Amiram, who had died in the Yom Kippur War.
