= Kalman Kahana =

Israeli politician and journalist

Faction represented in the Knesset
- 1949–1951: United Religious Front
- 1951–1955: Poalei Agudat Yisrael
- 1955–1960: Religious Torah Front
- 1960–1974: Poalei Agudat Yisrael
- 1974–1977: Religious Torah Front
- 1977–1981: Poalei Agudat Yisrael

Personal details
- Born: 31 May 1910 Brody, Austria-Hungary
- Died: 20 August 1991 (aged 81)

Kalman Kahana (Hebrew: קלמן כהנא; 31 May 1910 – 20 August 1991) was a long-serving Israeli politician and journalist, and a signatory of the Israeli declaration of independence. He was the brother of Yitzhak Kahan, a President of the Supreme Court of Israel.

== Background ==
Kalman was born in Brody in Galicia, an area of the Austro-Hungarian Empire now in modern-day Ukraine. He studied philosophy, semitic languages, history and pedagogy at Berlin University and Würzburg University, eventually gaining a PhD in philosophy. He also graduated as a Rabbi from the Hildesheimer Rabbinical Seminary of Berlin, and was head of the Haredi Students Organization in the city, as well as being a member of the Young Aguda movement.

Kalman emigrated to Mandatory Palestine in 1938, settling in the Kibbutz of Hafetz Haim. After immigrating, he became editor of the Sha'arim newspaper.

== Political career ==
Shortly after arriving in Palestine, Kahana became involved in politics, joining the secretariat of the Executive Committee of Poalei Agudat Yisrael and the central committee of the international organisation. He went on to become president of the federation. His position as head of the largest Ultra-orthodox workers union meant that he became a member of Provisional State Council, and was one of the people to sign Israel's declaration of independence.

Kahana was elected to the first Knesset as a member of the United Religious Front, an alliance of Agudat Yisrael, the political wing of Poalei Agudat Yisrael, Mizrachi and Hapoel HaMizrachi.

For the 1951 elections, Poalei Agudat Yisrael stood as an independent party, gaining two seats. Kahana headed the faction in the Knesset, and was appointed Deputy Minister of Education and Culture when the party joined David Ben-Gurion's coalition government. The party was involved in bringing down the third government when it disagreed with Ben-Gurion over the need for strengthening religious education. Despite not being a coalition partner in the fourth, fifth and sixth governments, Kahana retained his Deputy Ministerial position.

Prior to the 1955 elections, Poalei Agudat Yisrael merged with Agudat Yisrael to form the Religious Torah Front. Kahana was elected to the Knesset on the new list. The parties also ran together in the 1959 elections, but split during the Knesset session.

Poalei Agudat Yisrael ran independently in the 1961, 1965 and 1969 elections, with Kahana retaining his seat as head of the party each time. He also regained his position as Deputy Minister of Education and Culture after the 1961 and 1965 elections.

The Religious Torah Front was reformed before the 1973 elections, with Kahana winning election on its list, but split again during the session. Poalei Agudat Yisrael won only one seat in the 1977 elections, and he entered the Knesset alone.

However, the party failed to cross the electoral threshold in the 1981 elections, and Kahana lost his Knesset seat. He retired from politics and died ten years later.
