= Religious Torah Front =

Religious Torah Front חזית דתית תורתית
- Founded: 1955 (first incarnation); 1973 (second incarnation)
- Dissolved: 1961 (first incarnation); 1977 (second incarnation)
- Split from: Agudat Yisrael; Poalei Agudat Yisrael
- Merged into: Agudat Yisrael; Poalei Agudat Yisrael
- Most MKs: 6 (1955,1959)

Election symbol
- גד

The Religious Torah Front (Hebrew: חזית דתית תורתית, Hazit Datit Toratit) was a political alliance in Israel composed of Agudat Yisrael and Poalei Agudat Yisrael.

== History ==
The Religious Torah Front was formed when the Ultra-orthodox parties Agudat Yisrael and Poalei Agudat Yisrael decided to contest the 1955 elections on a joint list.

In the election the party won 4.7% of the vote and six seats, an improvement on the 3.6% (five seats) won by the parties individually in the 1951 elections, but were not included in David Ben-Gurion's coalition government. During the Knesset session the party changed its name to Agudat Yisrael - Poalei Agudat Yisrael. However, they changed it back to Religious Torah Front before the 1959 elections.

In the 1959 ballot, the party again won 4.7% of the vote and six seats but remained outside the government. Due to internal disagreements, the party split into its constituent parts before the 1961 elections, with Agudat Yisrael taking four of the six seats and Poalei Agudat Yisrael the other two.

The party was reformed for the 1973 elections, in which it won 3.8% of the vote and five seats. Despite its poor showing, the party was the fourth largest in a Knesset dominated by the Alignment (51 seats) and Likud (39 seats). During this time, the party was opposed to attempts to introduce comprehensive civil rights legislation, and was particularly shocked with attempts to formally enshrining religious freedom into a potential constitution. In any event, the party split once again during this Knesset session, with Agudat Yisrael taking three seats and Poalei Agudat Yisrael two. Agudat Israel eventually caused the government to fall at the end of 1976 by bringing a motion of no-confidence after the Israeli Air Force had breached the Sabbath.

In 1977, the party split once again and this time it was final.

== Knesset members ==
Knesset term	Seats	Faction	Members
3rd (1955–1959)	3	Poalei Agudat Yisrael	Kalman Kahana, Ya'akov Katz, Binyamin Mintz
3rd (1955–1959)	3	Agudat Yisrael	Zalman Ben-Ya'akov, Yitzhak-Meir Levin, Shlomo Lorincz
4th (1959–1961)	3	Poalei Agudat Yisrael	Kalman Kahana, Ya'akov Katz, Binyamin Mintz
4th (1959–1961)	3	Agudat Yisrael	Yitzhak-Meir Levin, Shlomo Lorincz, Menachem Porush
8th (1973–1977)	2	Poalei Agudat Yisrael	Kalman Kahana, Avraham Verdiger
8th (1973–1977)	3	Agudat Yisrael	Yehuda Meir Abramowicz, Shlomo Lorincz, Menachem Porush (Note: Replaced by Shlomo-Jacob Gross)
