= Aharon Becker =

Israeli politician (1905–1995)

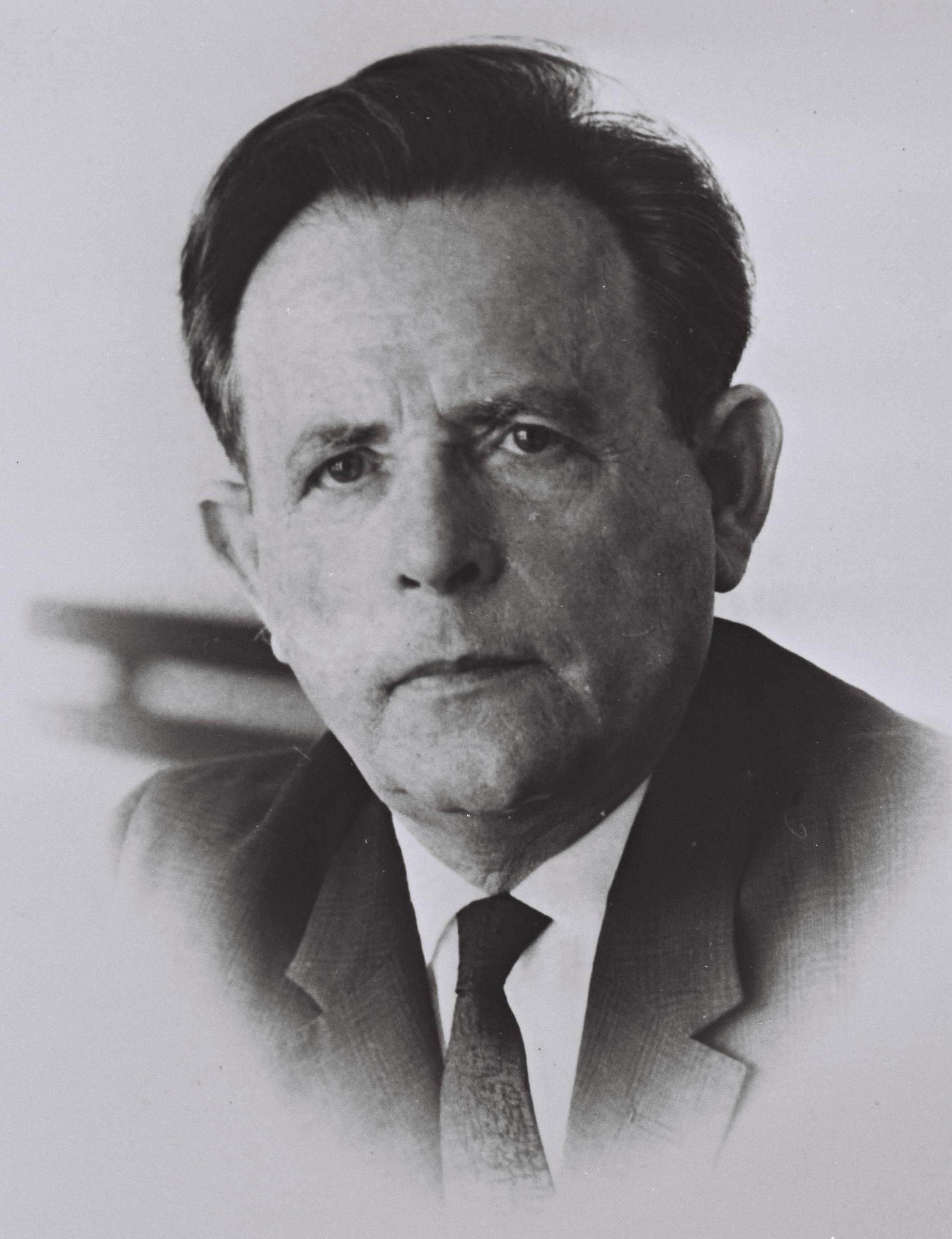
- Becker in 1969

Faction represented in the Knesset
- 1955–1957: Mapai
- 1959–1960: Mapai
- 1961–1965: Mapai
- 1965–1968: Alignment
- 1968–1969: Labor Party
- 1969–1974: Alignment

Personal details
- Born: 21 December 1905 Kobryn, Russian Empire
- Died: 24 December 1995 (aged 90)

Aharon Becker (Hebrew: אהרן בקר; 21 December 1905 – 24 December 1995) was an Israeli politician who served as a member of the Knesset between 1955 and 1974.

== Biography ==
Born in Kobryn in the Russian Empire (today in Belarus), Becker was educated at a heder and gymnasium. He joined Tze'irei Zion, and was a member until the organisation was disbanded by the Bolsheviks in 1920. After Kobryn became part of Poland, he studied bookkeeping at a local trade school.

In 1925 he emigrated to Mandatory Palestine, and initially worked as an agricultural labourer in Petah Tikva, before moving into construction. In 1926 he was amongst the founders of the Hebrew Socialist Youth, and also became a member of Ahdut HaAvoda. Between 1928 and 1932 he was secretary of the Ramat Gan Workers Committee, before serving as a member of the Tel Aviv Workers Council from 1932 until 1943. He became a member of the Histadrut's central committee, and headed its labour union department from 1949 until 1960. From 1961 until 1969 he served as the Histadrut's secretary.

In 1948 he travelled to the United States to purchase arms for the IDF. Between 1948 and 1949 he was director in the Ministry of Defense, before becoming Managing Director of the Supply Authority, which supplied civilian equipment to soldiers.

In 1955 he was elected to the Knesset on the Mapai list, but resigned his seat on 1 October the following year. He returned to the Knesset following the 1959 elections, but resigned again on 23 May 1960. He returned to the Knesset for a third time after the 1961 elections and was re-elected in 1965. In 1966 he requested to stand down as Histadrut leader for personal reasons, but was re-elected after Prime Minister Levi Eshkol asked Mapai members to require Becker to remain in post. However, in June 1969 he announced that he would not stand in the Histadrut elections in September that year, and was succeeded by Yitzhak Ben-Aharon. He was re-elected to the Knesset again in October 1969, but lost his seat in the 1973 elections after being placed low down the party's list. After leaving the Knesset he became chairman of the Kupat Holim health fund's central committee in 1974.

He died in 1995 at the age of 90. A street in Tel Aviv is named after him.
