= Tzipora Laskov =

Israeli nurse and politician

Faction represented in the Knesset
- 1955: Ahdut HaAvoda

Personal details
- Born: 1904 Russian Empire
- Died: 1989 (aged 84–85)

Tzipora Laskov (Hebrew: צפורה לסקוב; 1904–1989) was an Israeli nurse and politician.

== Biography ==
Born in the Russian Empire, Laskov studied to become a nurse. However, she and her husband David were exiled to Siberia by the Soviet government. The couple fled to China, where they established a branch of Hashomer Hatzair in Harbin. They later emigrated to Mandate Palestine in 1928, where Tzipora and found work at a factory.

In 1929 she began working as a nurse at a Histadrut hospital in Ein Harod, later working in the HaEmek hospital. She helped establish Mother and Child clinics in Hadera and Haifa, and was a member of the Nurses Organisation and the Working Mothers Organisation. During World War II Laskov and husband David volunteered for the British Army, in which she helped found the Organisation of Soldiers Wives. She also helped establish an institution for soldiers' children at Kfar Yehezkel and the Shabtai Levy children's home in Haifa.

A member of the Ahdut HaAvoda party, she was a member of the Assembly of Representatives, and in 1955 was elected to the Knesset on the party's list. However, she gave up her seat before being sworn in, and was replaced by Nahum Nir.

In 1962 she opened a community clinic for family therapy in Haifa, working there until 1967.
