= Binyamin Avniel =

Israeli politician

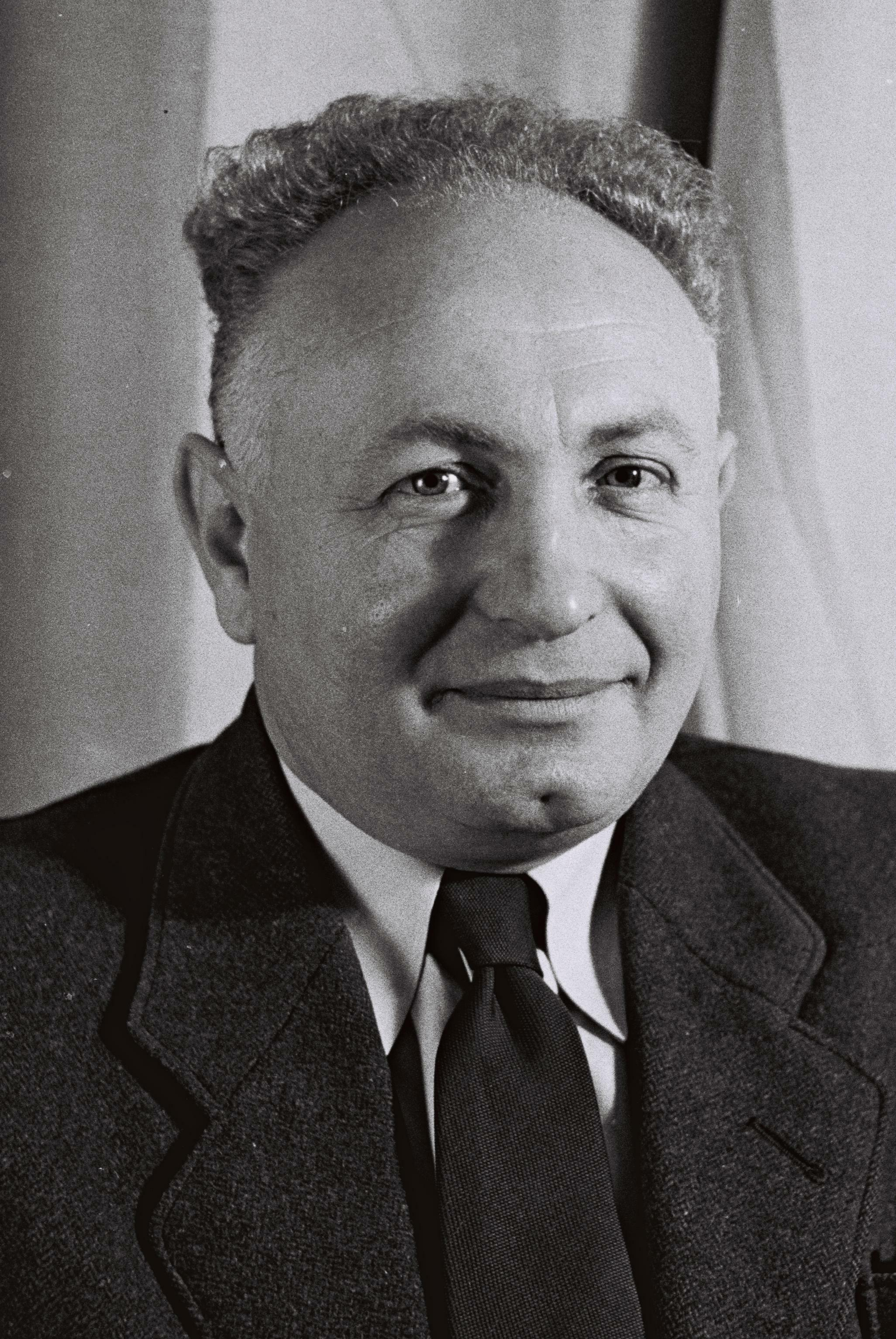
- Avniel in 1951

Faction represented in the Knesset
- 1951–1965: Herut
- 1965–1969: Gahal

Personal details
- Born: 1 November 1906 Jerusalem, Ottoman Empire
- Died: 18 June 1993 (aged 86)

Binyamin Avniel (Hebrew: בנימין אבניאל; 1 November 1906 – 18 June 1993) was an Israeli politician who served as a member of the Knesset for Herut and Gahal from 1951 to 1969.

== Biography ==
Born Binyamin Gatstein in Jerusalem during the Ottoman era, Avniel was educated at a heder, before studying at a Teachers Seminary in Jerusalem and then education and social sciences at the University of Brussels, where he earned a PhD in social sciences and economics. He wrote several books, including The Arab Problem in the Land of Israel (1937), The Canton Problem: Facts, Figures and Assumptions (1937), Democracy vs. Dictatorship (1939) and Labor Problem in the Land (1940).

He was elected to the Knesset on the Herut list in 1951, and was re-elected in 1955, 1959, 1961 and 1965, by which time Herut had formed the Gahal alliance with the Liberal Party. He lost his seat in the 1969 elections, and died in 1993.
