= Yona Kesse =

Israeli politician (1907–1985)

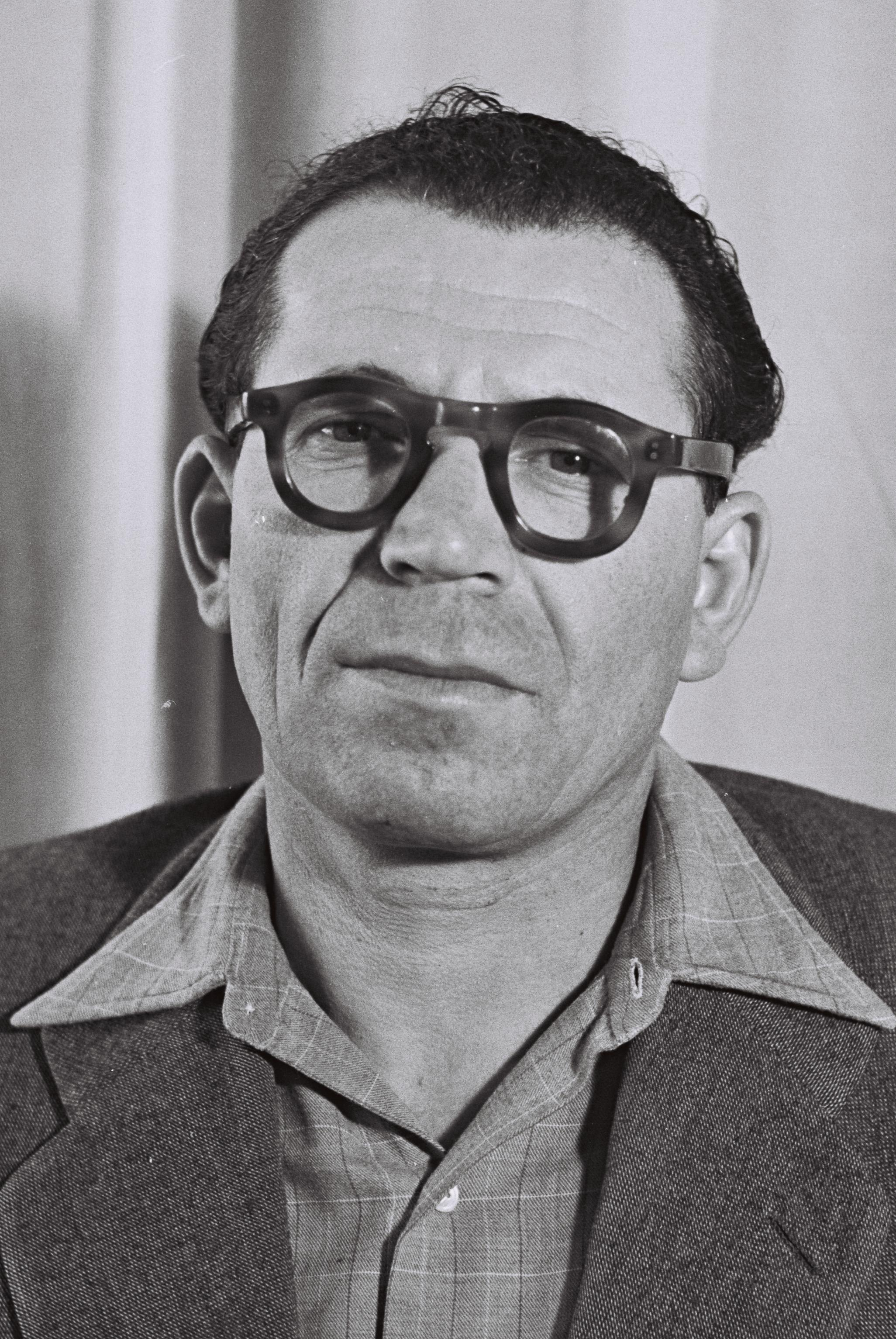
- Kesse in 1951

Faction represented in the Knesset
- 1949–1964: Mapai
- 1964–1965: Independent

Personal details
- Born: 15 October 1907 Dobre, Russian Empire
- Died: 27 June 1985 (aged 77)

Yona Kesse (Hebrew: יונה כסה; 15 October 1907 – 27 June 1985) was an Israeli politician who served as a member of the Knesset between 1949 and 1965.

== Biography ==
Born in Dobre in the Russian Empire (today in Ukraine), Kesse was educated at a heder. During his youth, he frequented the home of Rabbi Menachem Mendel Schneerson. His parents died in the Holodomor in 1921. He was a member of HeHalutz, which was an illegal organisation in Russia, and in 1925 he was arrested for Zionist activities. The following year he made aliyah to Mandatory Palestine.

Kesse joined Hapoel Hatzair, and in 1932 became secretary of Rehovot Workers Council. Between 1933 and 1936 he was a member of the Kfar Bilu moshav, before joining Kvutzat Shiller in 1936. A member of the Histadrut trade union's education centre, he was also a member of the Haganah's regional command in the south of Palestine. In 1938, he became secretary of Mapai, also holding the position between 1939 and 1940, and again from 1953 until 1956.

In 1949, he was elected to the first Knesset on the Mapai list. He was re-elected in 1951, 1955, 1959 and 1961. On 22 December 1964, he resigned from Mapai and became an independent MK; his attempt at forming a single-member faction by the name of Min HaYesod, being rejected by the House Committee.

He lost his seat in the 1965 elections. He died in 1985.
