= Yisrael Kargman =

Israeli politician (1906–1987)

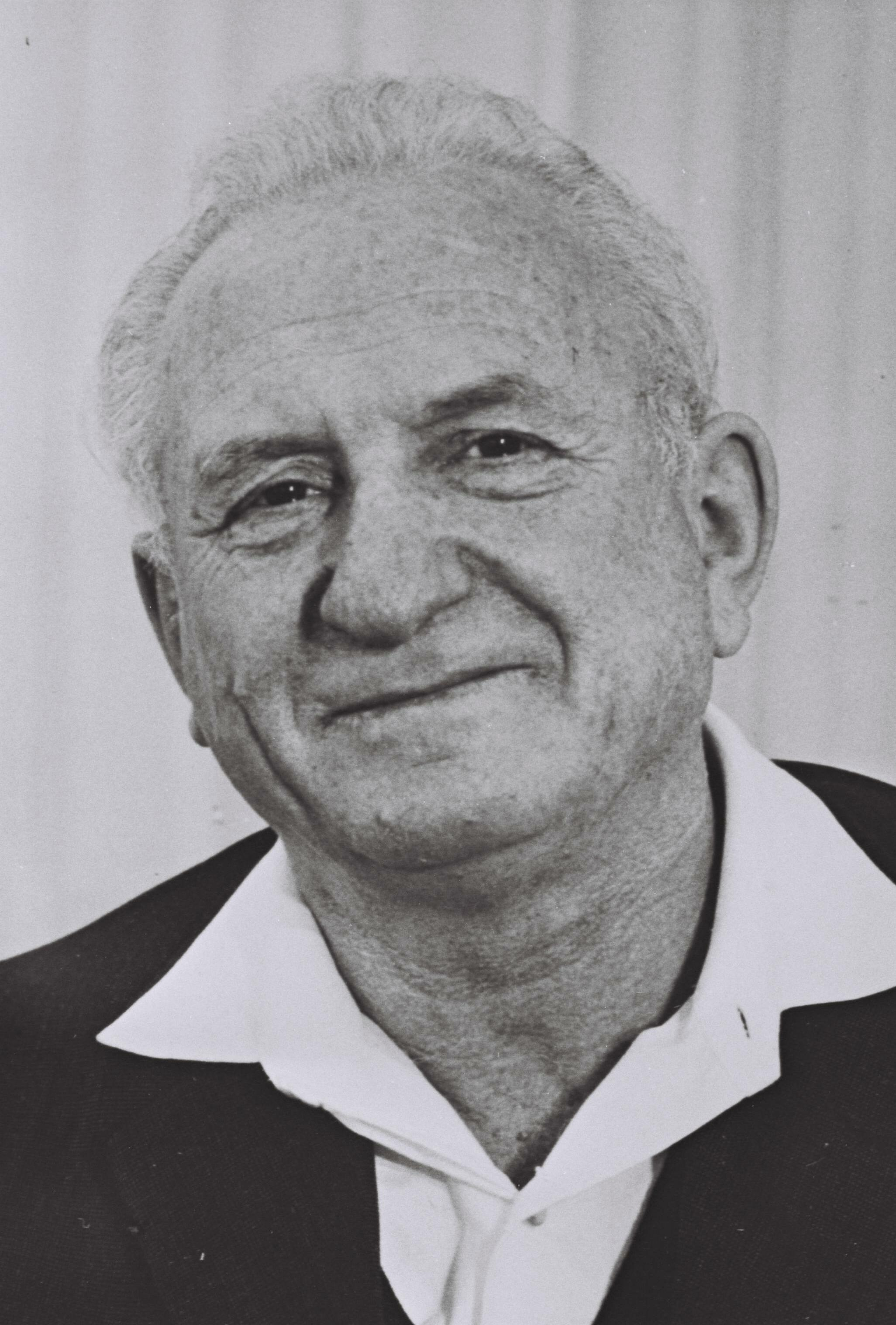
- Kargman in 1969

Faction represented in the Knesset
- 1957–1965: Mapai
- 1965–1968: Alignment
- 1968–1969: Labor Party
- 1969–1977: Alignment

Personal details
- Born: 23 December 1906 Berdychiv, Russian Empire
- Died: 17 November 1987 (aged 80)

Yisrael Kargman (Hebrew: ישראל קרגמן; 23 December 1906 – 17 November 1987) was an Israeli politician who served as a member of the Knesset for Mapai and its successors between 1957 and 1977.

== Biography ==
Born in Berdychiv in the Russian Empire (today in Ukraine), Kargman was a member of the HeHalutz movement, which was illegal during the Soviet era. He was exiled to Siberia in 1925, where he remained until emigrating to Mandatory Palestine in 1929.

A member of Mapai, he was on the party's list for the 1955 elections. Although he failed to win a seat, he entered the Knesset on 8 October 1956 as a replacement for Zalman Shazar. He retained his seat in elections in 1959, 1961, 1965, 1969 and 1973, by which time Mapai had merged into the Labor Party and formed the Alignment alliance. He lost his seat in the 1977 elections, which saw the Alignment lose 17 of its 49 seats. In 1977, Minister of Education Zevulun Hammer appointed him as the Chairman of the Board of Trustees of the Prime Minister's Prize for Hebrew Literary Works. In 1981 his tenure was extended for three more years.

He died in 1987 at the age of 80.
