= Avraham Deutsch =

Israeli politician

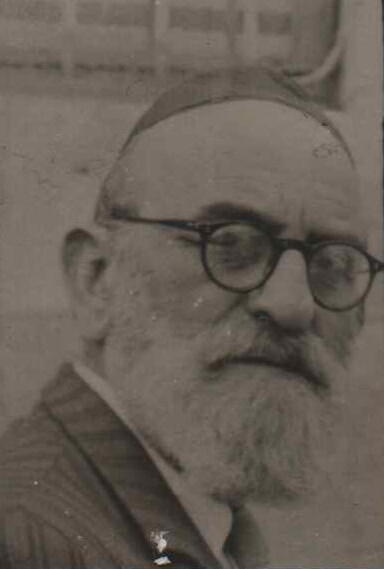
- Deutsch in the 1950s

Faction represented in the Knesset
- 1951–1953: Agudat Yisrael

Personal details
- Born: 1889 Austria-Hungary
- Died: 25 May 1953 (aged 63–64)

Avraham Deutsch (Hebrew: אברהם דויטש; 1889 – 25 May 1953) was an Israeli politician who served as a member of the Knesset for Agudat Yisrael between 1951 and 1953.

== Biography ==
Born in the Hungarian part of Austria-Hungary, Deutsch was educated in yeshivas, and was certified as a rabbi. He later studied at the University of Vienna, gaining a doctorate in pedagogy and philosophy.

In 1920 he moved to Budapest and became director of the educational institutions of the local Orthodox community. In 1943, he represented Hungarian Jews at the Bermuda Conference, which aimed to decide what to do with Jews who had been liberated by Allied forces. He escaped from Nazi-controlled Hungary to Switzerland with the Kastner train.

In 1950 he emigrated to Israel, where he became chief supervisor of Agudat Yisrael's educational system and chairman of the party's education department. In 1951, he was elected to the Knesset on the party's list. He died whilst still an MK in 1953. His seat was taken by Zalman Ben-Ya'akov.
