= Sarah Kafrit =

Israeli politician (1900–1983)

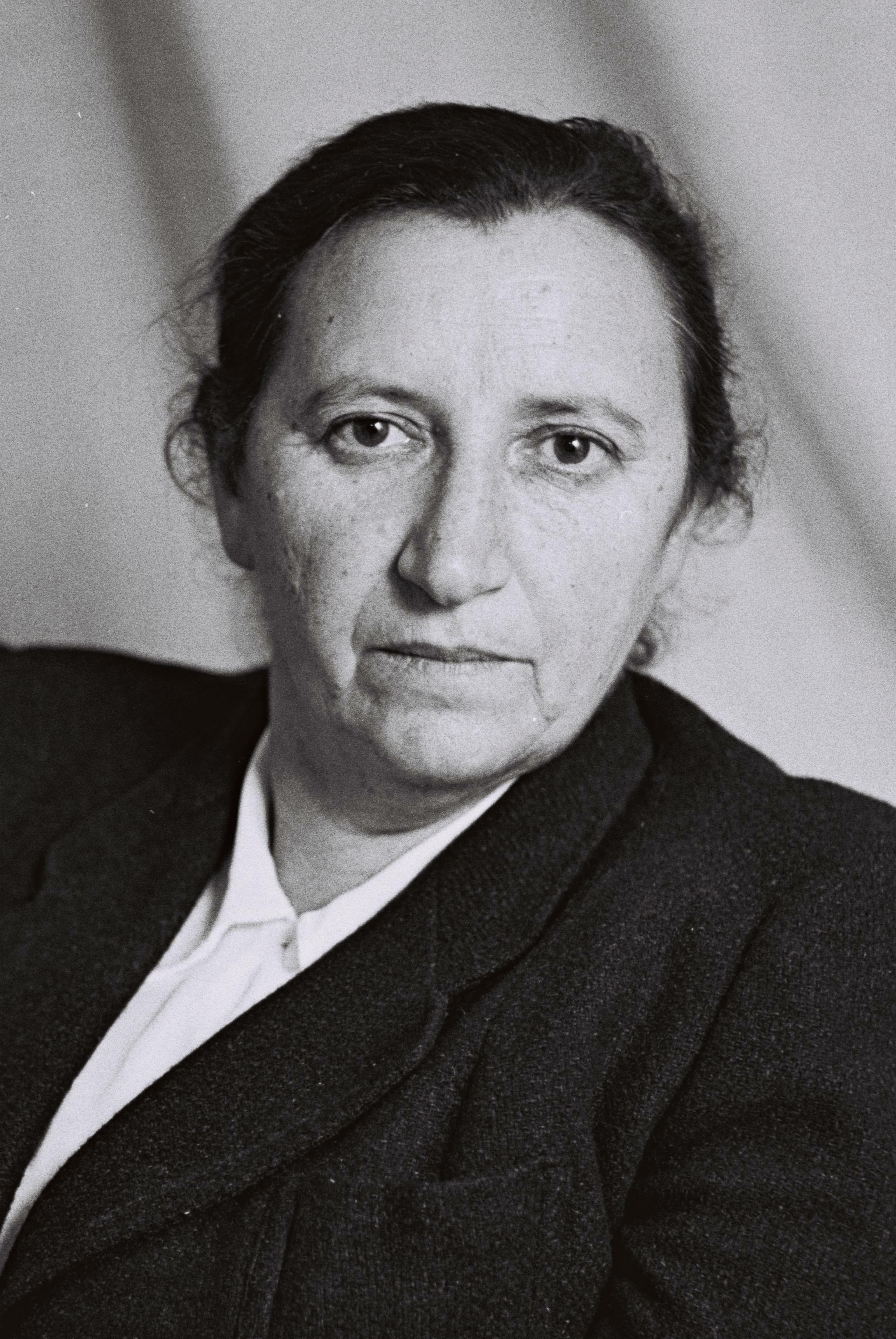
- Kafrit in 1951

Faction represented in the Knesset
- 1951–1959: Mapai

Personal details
- Born: 26 July 1900 Minsk, Russian Empire
- Died: 1 June 1983 (aged 82)

Sarah Kafrit (Belarusian: Сара Кафрыт, Hebrew: שרה כפרית; 26 July 1900 – 1 June 1983) was an Israeli politician who served as a member of the Knesset for Mapai between 1951 and 1959.

== Biography ==
Born in Minsk in the Russian Empire (today in Belarus), Kafrit was educated at a local high school. Having joined Poale Zion in her home town, she made aliyah to Palestine in 1920. After studying at a Kindergarten Seminary in Tel Aviv. She worked as a nursery teacher at Mikveh Israel and Nahalal. In 1927, she was amongst the founders of moshav Kfar Yehoshua, and was later secretary of the Moshavim Movement. She also became a member of the secretariat of Women's Councils, and travelled abroad as an emissary (to the United States in 1946, and South Africa in 1958).

A member of the Mapai central committee, she was a member of the Assembly of Representatives. She was placed thirtieth on the party's list for the 1951 Knesset elections and entered the legislature as Mapai won 45 seats. She was re-elected in 1955 after being placed 35th on the Mapai list but lost her seat in the 1959 elections.

She died in 1983 at the age of 82.
