= Dvora Netzer =

Israeli politician (1897–1989)

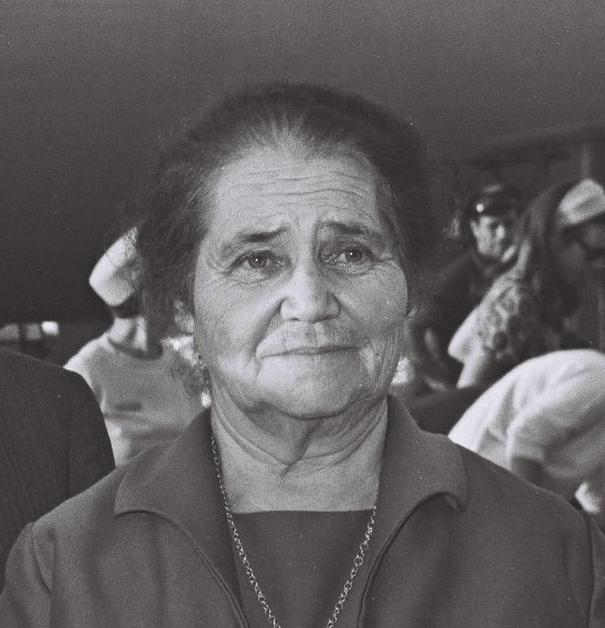
- Netzer in 1966

Faction represented in the Knesset
- 1949–1965: Mapai
- 1965–1968: Alignment
- 1968–1969: Labor Party
- 1969: Alignment

Personal details
- Born: 1 May 1897; Mena, Russian Empire
- Died: 4 January 1989 (aged 91)

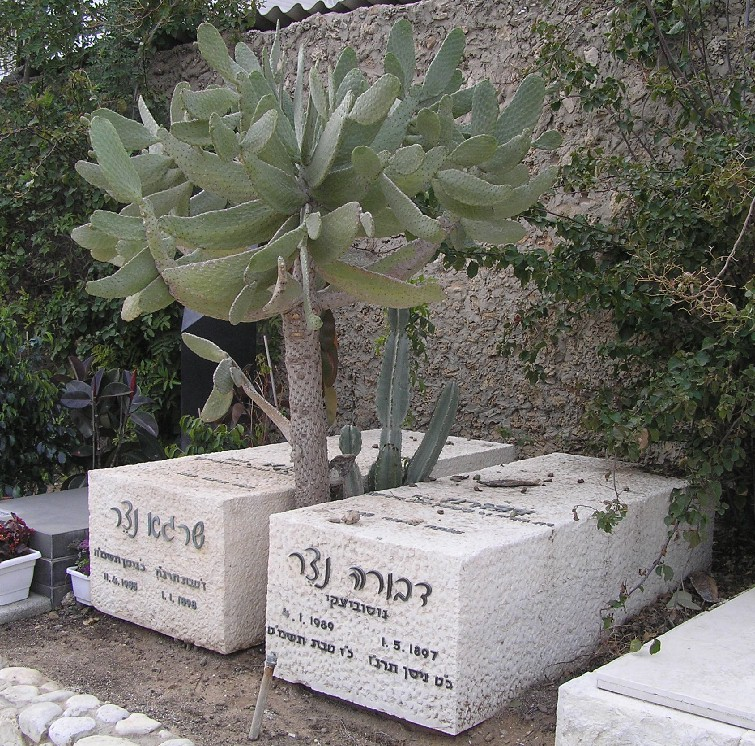
Netzer's tomb alongside her husband's

Dvora Netzer (Hebrew: דבורה נצר; 1 May 1897 – 4 January 1989) was an Israeli politician who served as a member of the Knesset for Mapai, the Labor Party and the Alignment between 1949 and 1969.

== Biography ==
Born Dvora Nosovistzky in Mena in the Russian Empire (today in Ukraine), Netzer was a member of HeHalutz and Youth of Zion youth movements, and later joined the Zionist Socialist Workers Party.

In 1925 she emigrated to Mandatory Palestine, where she worked as a teacher, becoming headmistress of a school for working youths, a job she held between 1925 and 1949. In 1933 she founded the Working Mothers Organisation in Tel Aviv, serving as its secretary until 1967. She was also a member of the Na'amat central committee and the Women Workers Council.

A member of Ahdut HaAvoda and later Mapai, she was a member of Mapai's central committee. In 1949 she was elected to the first Knesset on the party's list. She was re-elected in 1951, 1955, 1959, 1961 and 1965. She retired from political life during the 1969 elections.

Between 1965 and 1969, she served as a Deputy Speaker of the Knesset. In this position, in November 1968, Netzer was formally selected as Acting Speaker of the Knesset and de facto served as Acting President of the State for a period of five days (17–21 November).

Netzer died in 1989 and was buried in Trumpeldor Cemetery in Tel Aviv next to her husband Shraga Netzer. She had two children, Moshe Netzer and Rina Shapiro.
