= Ya'akov Katz (politician born 1906) =

Israeli politician

Faction represented in the Knesset
- 1955–1960: Religious Torah Front
- 1960–1967: Poalei Agudat Yisrael

Personal details
- Born: 28 December 1906 Zolochiv, Austria-Hungary
- Died: 21 December 1967 (aged 60)

Ya'akov Katz (Hebrew: יעקב כ"ץ; 28 December 1906 – 21 December 1967) was an Israeli politician who served as a member of the Knesset for the Religious Torah Front and Poalei Agudat Yisrael between 1955 and 1967.

== Biography ==
Born in Zolochiv in Galicia in Austria-Hungary (today in Ukraine, from 1919 to 1939 in Poland), Katz received a Haredi education, and joined Young Agudat Yisrael.

He made aliyah to Mandatory Palestine in 1934, and settled in Haifa, where he became secretary of the local branch of Poalei Agudat Yisrael. He also served as director of the organisation's Immigrant Absorption Department for the north of the country.

During the 1948 Arab-Israeli War Katz served as a member of the Situation Committee and Mobilization Committee. In 1950 he was elected to Haifa city council, on which he served until 1967. The following year he became a member of its directorate (on which he remained until 1967) and deputy mayor, a position he held until 1959.

In 1955 he was elected to the Knesset on the Religious Torah Front list, an alliance of Agudat Yisrael and Poalei Agudat Yisrael. He was re-elected in 1959, 1961 and 1965. He died in office on 21 December 1967, his seat taken by Avraham Verdiger.
