= Simha Babah =

Israeli politician (1902–1973)

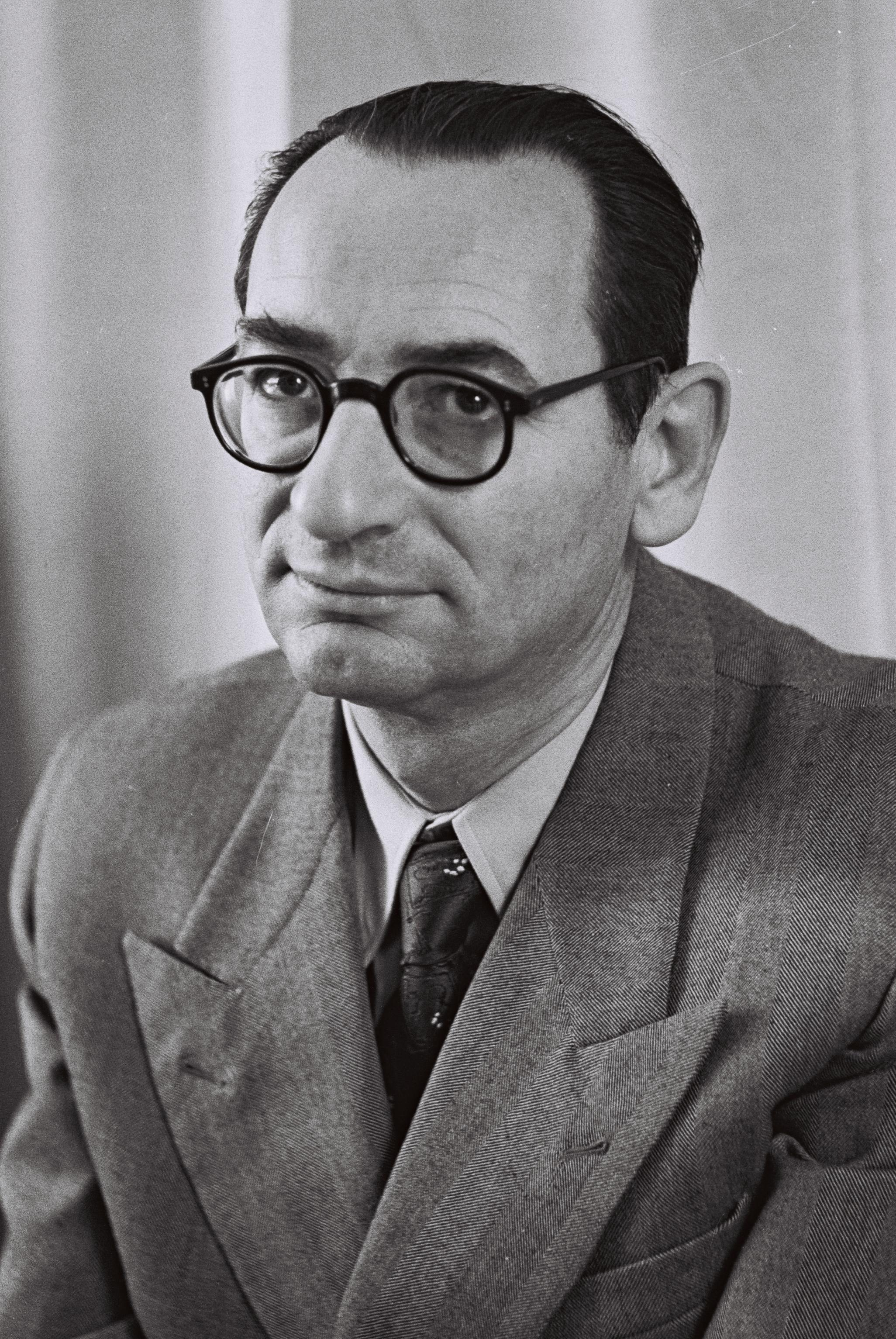
- Babah in 1951

Faction represented in the Knesset
- 1951–1959: General Zionists

Personal details
- Born: 27 November 1902
- Died: 10 December 1973 (aged 71)

Simha Babah (Hebrew: שמחה בבה; 27 November 1902 – 10 December 1973) was an Israeli politician who served as a member of the Knesset for the General Zionists between 1951 and 1959.

== Biography ==
Born in an area that was later to become part of Poland, Babah was a member of the central committee of the Polish branch of the Zionist Organization, and was also a member of Et Livnot. He edited the Yiddish language newspaper Zionist World.

In 1933 he emigrated to Mandatory Palestine. After World War II he headed the body responsible for absorbing demobilized soldiers, and in 1948 he became deputy director of the soldiers department of the Ministry of Defense.

A member of the General Zionists, he was elected to the Knesset on the party's list in 1951. He was re-elected in 1955, but lost his seat in the 1959 elections.

He died in 1973 at the age of 71.
