= Avraham Verdiger =

Israeli politician (1921–2013)

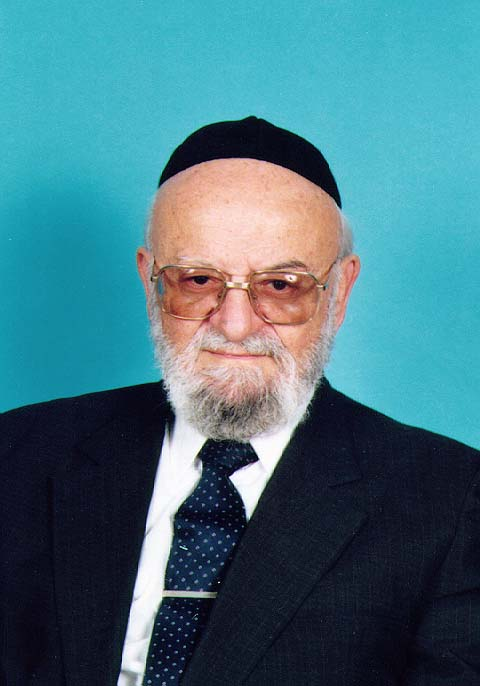

Faction represented in the Knesset
- 1967–1974: Poalei Agudat Yisrael
- 1974–1977: Religious Torah Front
- 1977: Poalei Agudat Yisrael
- 1984–1988: Morasha
- 1988–1992: Agudat Yisrael
- 1994–1996: United Torah Judaism
- 1996: Agudat Yisrael

Personal details
- Born: 6 May 1921 Łódź, Poland
- Died: 27 November 2013 (aged 92) Jerusalem, Israel

Avraham Verdiger (Hebrew: אברהם ורדיגר; 6 May 1921 – 27 November 2013) was an Israeli politician who served as a member of the Knesset for several ultra-Orthodox parties between 1965 and 1996.

== Biography ==
Born in Łódź in Poland, Verdiger emigrated to Mandatory Palestine in 1947. He was on the Poalei Agudat Yisrael list for the 1965 elections, and although he failed to win a seat, he entered the Knesset on 21 December 1967 as a replacement for the deceased Ya'akov Katz. He was re-elected in elections in 1969 and 1973 (in which Poalei Agudat Yisrael ran as part of the Religious Torah Front alliance), before losing his seat in the 1977 elections.

In 1984 he joined the new Morasha party, and was elected to the Knesset on its list. Prior to the 1988 elections the party merged into Agudat Yisrael, and Verdiger was re-elected on their list. On 27 November 1990, he was appointed Deputy Minister of Jerusalem Affairs. He lost his seat and ministerial post following the 1992 elections (in which the party ran as part of the United Torah Judaism alliance), but returned to the Knesset again on 28 June 1994 as a replacement for Menachem Porush. He lost his seat again in the 1996 elections.

Verdiger died in November 2013 at the age of 92.
