= Shlomo Perlstein =

Israeli politician

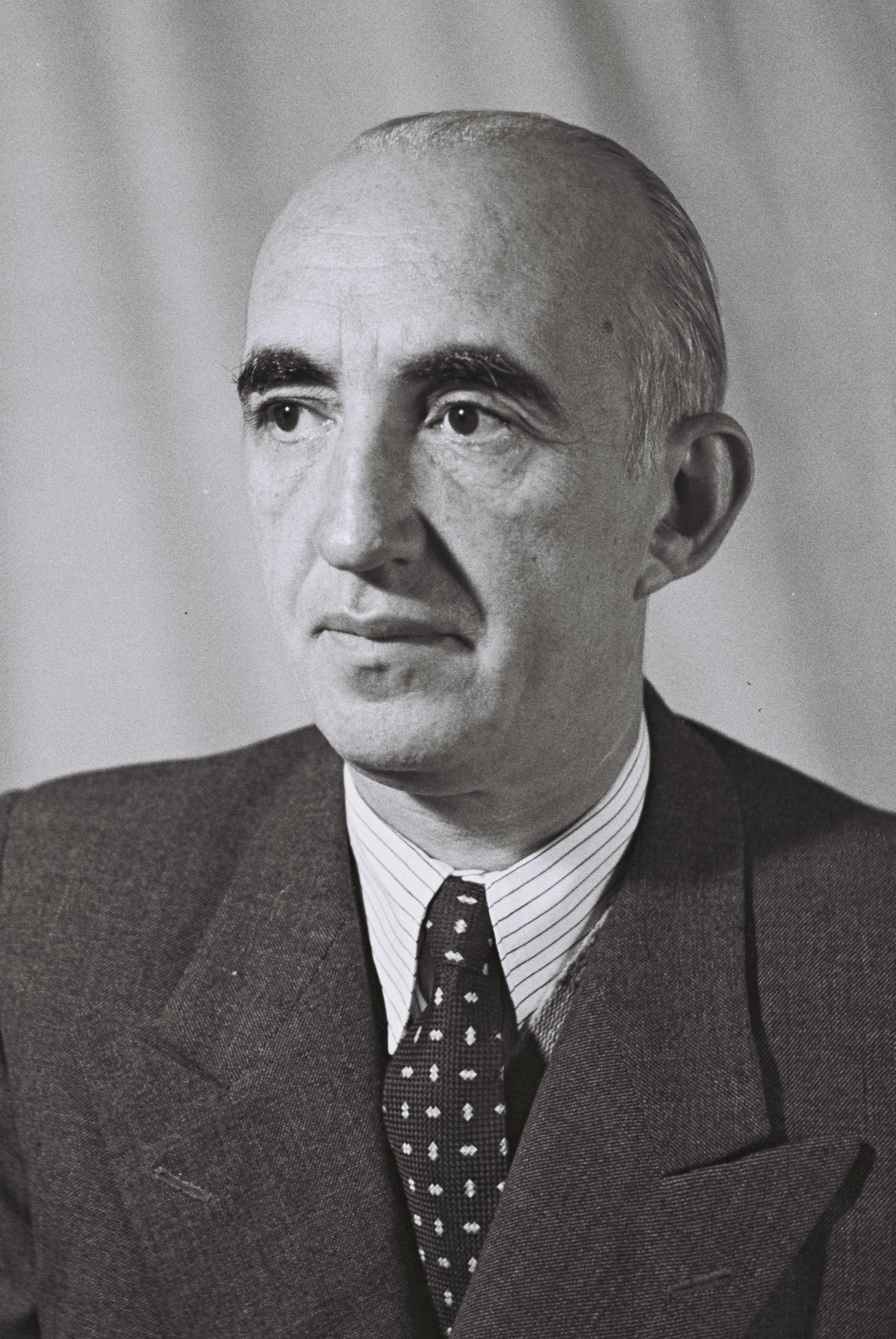
- Perlstein in 1951

Faction represented in the Knesset
- 1951–1959: General Zionists
- 1961–1965: Liberal Party
- 1965–1969: Gahal

Personal details
- Born: 2 September 1902 Przemyśl, Austria-Hungary
- Died: 19 April 1979 (aged 76)

Shlomo Perlstein (Hebrew: שלמה פרלשטיין; 2 September 1902 – 19 April 1979) was an Israeli politician who served as a member of the Knesset from 1951 until 1959, and again from 1961 until 1969.

== Biography ==
Born in Przemyśl in Austria-Hungary (today in Poland), Perlstein attended school in Baden. He emigrated to Mandatory Palestine in 1933, where he became involved in the hotels business. In 1940 he became chairman of the hospitality section of the General Association of Merchants, becoming the organisation's overall chairman in 1942.

A member of Tel Aviv city council, he was elected to the Knesset on the General Zionists list in 1951. He was re-elected in 1955, but lost his seat in the 1959 elections. However, he returned to the Knesset after the 1961 elections (by which time the General Zionists had merged into the Liberal Party), and was re-elected in 1965 on the Herut-Liberal Bloc list. He lost his seat again in the 1969 elections.

He died in 1979 at the age of 76.
