= Yitzhak-Meir Levin =

Polish-Israeli politician

- יצחק-מאיר לוין
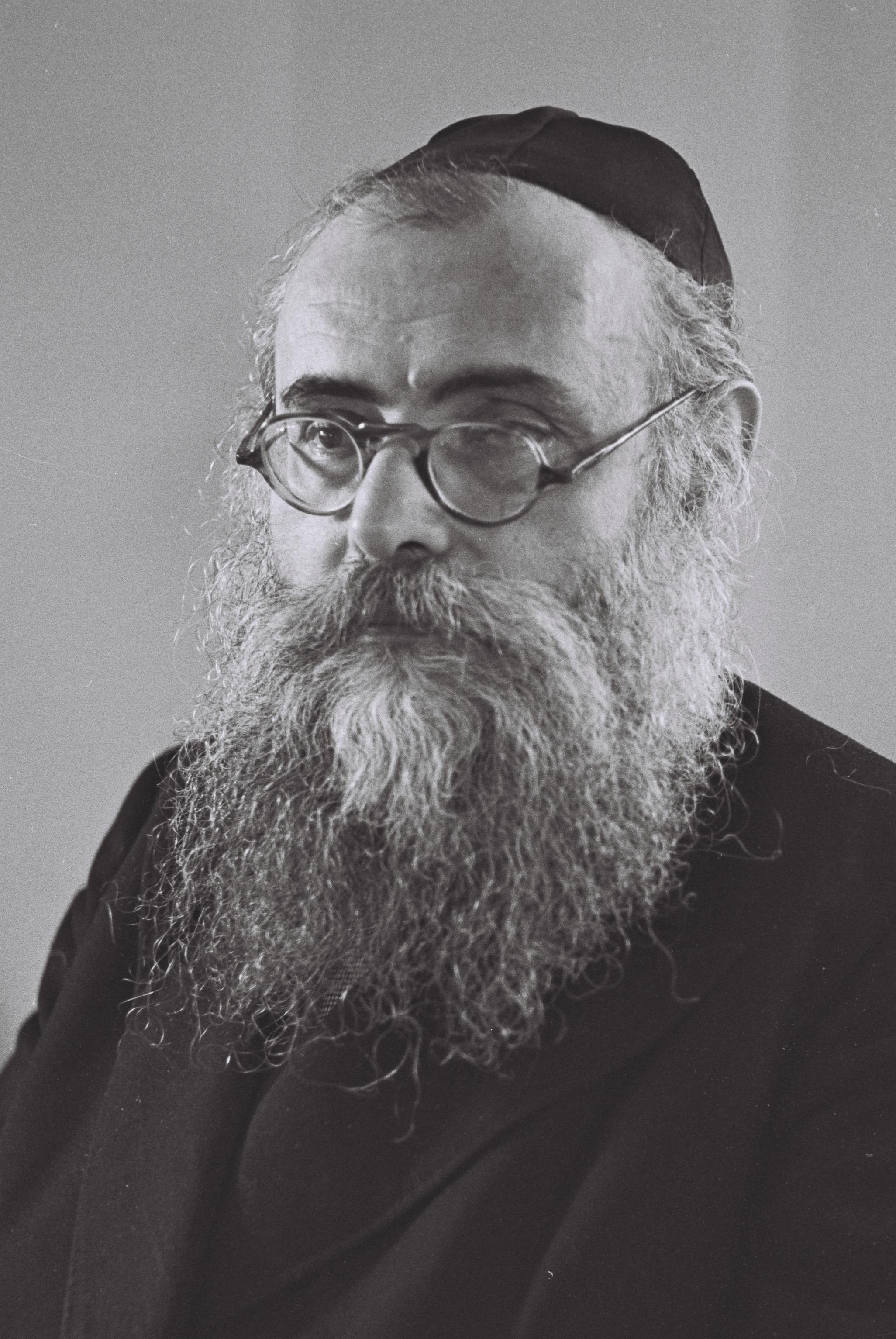
- Levin in 1951

Leader of the Opposition
- De facto 5 June 1967 – 6 August 1970
- Prime Minister: Levi Eshkol; Yigal Allon (interim); Golda Meir
- Preceded by: Menachem Begin
- Succeeded by: Menachem Begin

Ministerial roles
- 1948–1952: Minister of Welfare

Faction represented in the Knesset
- 1949–1951: United Religious Front
- 1951–1955: Agudat Yisrael
- 1955–1960: Religious Torah Front
- 1960–1971: Agudat Yisrael

Personal details
- Born: 30 January 1893 Góra Kalwaria, Russian Empire
- Died: 7 August 1971 (aged 78)

Yitzhak-Meir Levin (Hebrew: יצחק-מאיר לוין; 30 January 1893 – 7 August 1971) was a Haredi politician in Poland and Israel. One of 37 people to sign the Israeli declaration of independence, he served in several Israeli cabinets and was a longtime leader and Knesset minister for Agudat Yisrael and related parties.

== Biography ==
Born Izaak Meir Lewin in Góra Kalwaria (known as Ger in Yiddish) in the Congress Poland part of the Russian Empire, Levin was a paternal descendant of Chanokh Heynekh Levin (1789–1870). In his early years he studied at yeshiva and received Semikhah. He married the daughter of Rabbi Avraham Mordechai Alter, head of the influential Ger hasidic dynasty at the age of 16.

During World War I he became involved in helping the victims of the war in Warsaw.

With a support of his family, he became involved in politics; he was one of the leaders of Agudath Israel in Poland, was elected to Warsaw Community Council as a representative of the organisation in 1924, and five years later was elected to the World Agudath Israel presidium. In 1937 he was elected as one of the two co-chairmen of the organisation's executive committee. In 1940 Levin became the sole chairman. He was also involved in founding the Bais Yaakov school system for religious Jewish girls.

Following the outbreak of World War II, Levin helped refugees in Warsaw, before emigrating to Mandatory Palestine in 1940, where he became head of the local branch of Agudath Israel.

After signing the Israeli declaration of independence in 1948, Levin joined David Ben-Gurion's provisional government as Minister of Welfare. He was elected to the first Knesset in 1949 as a member of the United Religious Front, an alliance of the four major religious parties, and was reappointed to his ministerial role in the first and second governments.

After retaining his seat in the 1951 elections Levin rejoined Ben-Gurion's government as Minister of Welfare, but resigned in 1952 in protest at the National Service Law for Women. He remained a member of the Knesset until his death in 1971, but not a member of the cabinet; in his remaining terms, he represented Religious Torah Front—an alliance of Agudat Yisrael and its worker's branch Poalei Agudat Yisrael.

He was buried on Mount of Olives Jewish Cemetery. The main street of the Sanhedria Murhevet neighbourhood in Jerusalem and a street in Bnei Brak are named after him.
