= Senetta Yoseftal =

Israeli politician (1912–2007)

- סנטה יוספטל
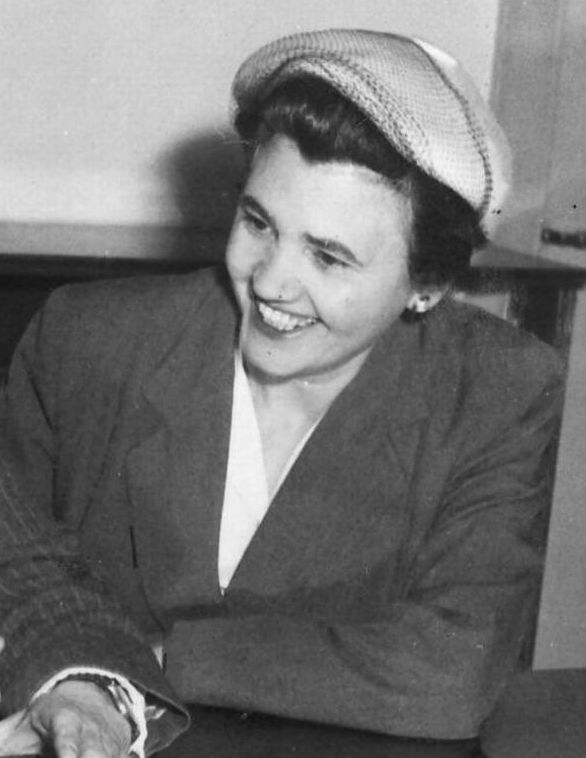

Faction represented in the Knesset
- 1955–1956: Mapai
- 1976–1977: Alignment

Personal details
- Born: Senetta Punfud; 5 December 1912 Fürth, Germany
- Died: 26 July 2007 (aged 94) Gal'ed, Israel

Senetta Yoseftal (née Punfud) (Hebrew: סנטה יוספטל; 5 December 1912 – 26 July 2007) was an Israeli politician.

== Background ==
Yoseftal was born as Senta Punfud in the Franconian town of Fürth in the Kingdom of Bavaria, Germany. After graduating from the girls' high school in Fürth (Mädchenlyzeum), she began studying law, but because she was Jewish, she was forced to give up her studies after the Nazis came to power in 1933. She joined the HaBonim movement in 1933 and worked in HeHalutz Center in Berlin from 1934 to 1938. In 1936 she married Giora Yoseftal (Georg Josephthal) from Nuremberg, later a member of the Knesset, and a minister in the 9th and 10th Israeli governments. She immigrated to Mandatory Palestine in 1938 and helped found Kibbutz Gal'ed in 1945.

She was elected to the Knesset in the 1955 election as a member of Mapai, but gave up her seat after 14 months. She also appeared in the eighth Knesset as a member of the Alignment, replacing Zvi Guershoni after his death, but did not retain her seat in the 1977 election.

In December 2004 she was asked by the Kibbutz Movement to retire from her activities. Towards the end of her life she resided in Kibbutz Gal'ed.

== Public activities ==
- Member of Directorate of the United Kibbutz Fund, 1953–1955
- Member of Organizing Committee of the Histadrut, 1956–1960
- Director of Economic Department of the United Kibbutz, 1960–1962
- General Secretary of the United Kibbutz, 1962–1965 and 1967–1970
- Founder and Director of the Department of Absorption and Development
- Chairwoman of Mekorot Water Company, 1970–1972
- Director of Economic Branch of the Agriculture Association, 1974–1979
- Member of Secretariat and Central Committee of the United Kibbutz Movement and member of Central Committee of the Labour Party
