= Yosef Efrati =

Israeli politician (1897–1975)

- יוסף אפרתי
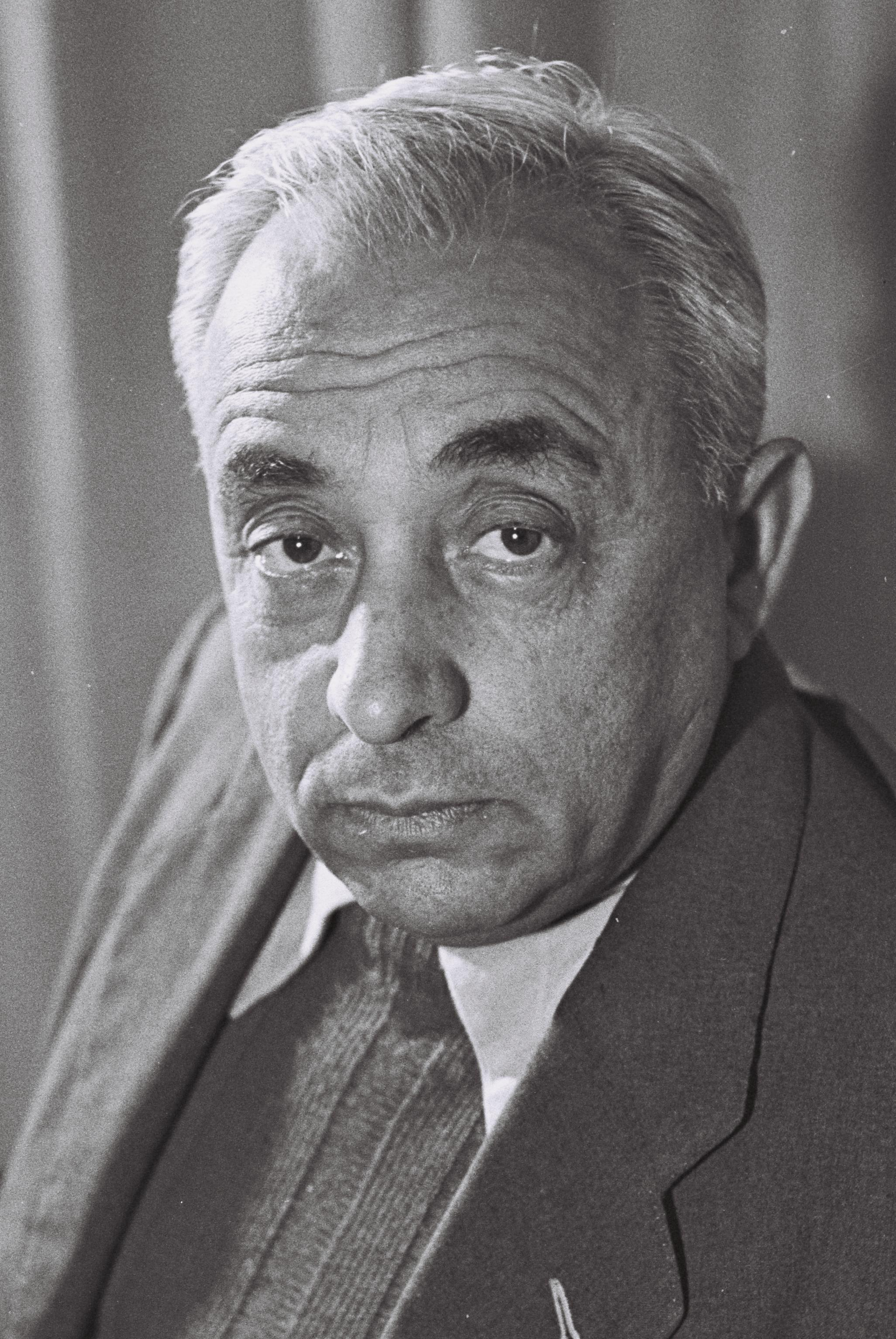
- Efrat in 1951

Faction represented in the Knesset
- 1949–1965: Mapai

Personal details
- Born: 19 February 1897 Pinsk, Russian Empire
- Died: 8 February 1975 (aged 77)

Yosef Efrati (Hebrew: יוסף אפרתי; 19 February 1897 – 8 February 1975) was an Israeli politician who served as a member of the Knesset between 1949 and 1965.

== Biography ==
Born in Pinsk in the Russian Empire (today in Belarus), Efrati received his primary education in a heder. He emigrated to Ottoman-controlled Palestine in 1914, and studied at an agricultural high school in Petah Tikva. In 1917 he joined the group that settled Be'er Tuvia. Between 1923 and 1925, he worked at an agricultural research station at Ben Shemen and moved to kibbutz Geva in 1925.

Efrati was a member of Hapoel Hatzair and later Mapai, as well as being one of the leaders of HaMerkaz HaHakla'i. In 1949, he was elected to the first Knesset on the Mapai list. In February 1951 he was appointed Deputy Minister of Agriculture, a role he held until 1955. He was re-elected in 1951. He was re-elected again in 1955, 1959 and 1961, before losing his seat in the 1965 elections. He died in 1975 at the age of 77.
