= Democratic List for Israeli Arabs =

Democratic List for Israeli Arabs القائمة الديموقراطية لعرب إسرائيل רשימה דמוקרטית לערביי ישראל
- Leader: Seif el-Din el-Zoubi
- National affiliation: Mapai
- Most MKs: 3 (1951–1955)
- Fewest MKs: 2 (1955–1959)

Election symbol
- יד

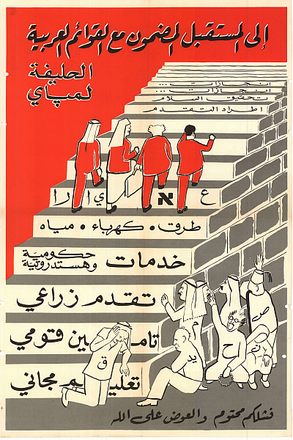
Mapai election poster urging Arabs to vote for its allied lists. The main slogan reads "Towards a guaranteed future with the Arab lists, allied with Mapai."

The Democratic List for Israeli Arabs (Arabic: القائمة الديموقراطية لعرب إسرائيل al-Qā'ima al-dīmũqrāṭiyya li-'arab Isrā'īl, Hebrew: רשימה דמוקרטית לערביי ישראל, Reshima Demokratit LeAravei Yisrael) was an Arab satellite list in Israel.

== History ==
In the 1951 elections the party gained 2% of the vote and won 3 seats, which were taken by Seif el-Din el-Zoubi, Masaad Kassis and Jabr Muadi. Like other Israeli Arab parties at the time, it was associated with David Ben-Gurion's Mapai, and as a result of the association, the party was included in all the coalition governments of the second Knesset.

In the 1955 election, the party lost support and dropped to two seats, with Muadi losing out, though the party remained part of the governing coalition. Towards the end of the session, el-Zoubi left the Knesset to become mayor of Nazareth, Muadi replacing him.

The party did not run in the 1959 elections. Kassis co-founded the Independent Faction for Israeli Arabs but failed to reach the 1% threshold, Muadi joined the Cooperation and Brotherhood party and reappeared in the Knesset after the 1961 election. El-Zoubi returned to the Knesset in the Progress and Development party (which Muadi also later joined) in the 1965 elections.
