= Binyamin Mintz =

Israeli politician

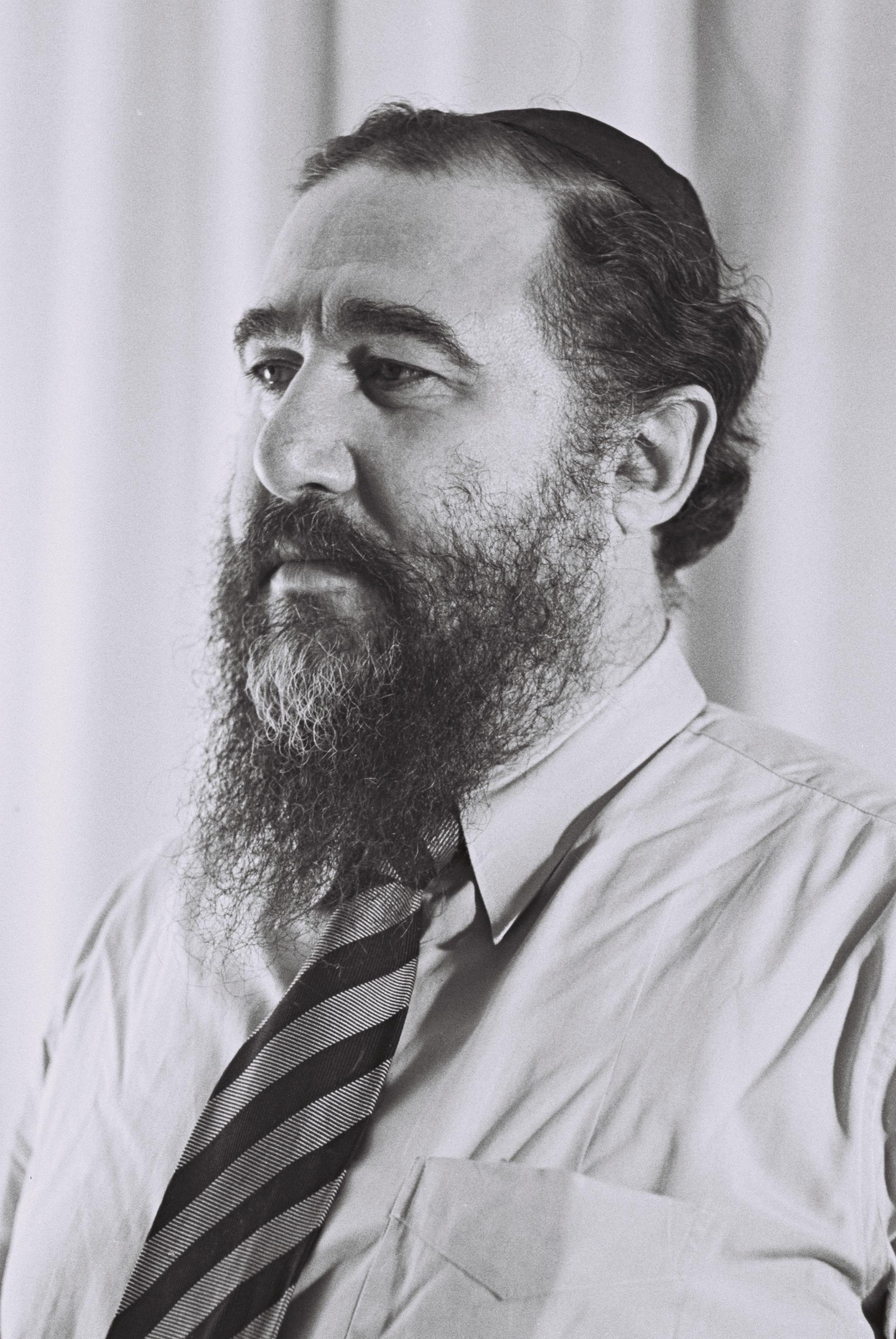
- Mintz in 1951

Ministerial roles
- 1960–1961: Minister of Postal Services

Faction represented in the Knesset
- 1949–1951: United Religious Front
- 1951–1955: Poalei Agudat Yisrael
- 1955–1960: Religious Torah Front
- 1960–1961: Poalei Agudat Yisrael

Personal details
- Born: 12 January 1903 Łódź, Russian Empire
- Died: 30 May 1961 (aged 58) Tel Aviv, Israel

Binyamin Mintz (Hebrew: בנימין מינץ; 12 January 1903 – 30 May 1961) was an Israeli politician who served briefly as Minister of Postal Services from July 1960 until his death.

== Biography ==
Born in Łódź in the Russian Empire (today in Poland), Mintz studied in a Hasidic Ger school, and was a member of Young Agudat Yisrael. He emigrated to Mandatory Palestine in 1925, and worked in construction and as a printer.

In 1933 he joined Poalei Agudat Yisrael, and was later a member of the Provisional State Council. In 1949, he was elected to the first Knesset on the list of the United Religious Front (an alliance of the four main religious parties). Re-elected in 1951, 1955, and 1959, he was appointed Minister of Postal Services by David Ben-Gurion on 17 July 1960, serving until his death the following May.

The village of Yad Binyamin, established in 1962, was named in his honour.
