= Poalei Agudat Yisrael =

Poalei Agudat Yisrael פועלי אגודת ישראל
- Leader: Yaakov Landa; Binyamin Mintz; Kalman Kahana; Avraham Verdiger; Hanoh Verdiger
- Founded: 1922
- Dissolved: 1988
- Merged into: Agudat Yisrael
- Newspaper: HaKol (Jerusalem); Sha'arim (Tel Aviv)
- Ideology: Ultra-Orthodox workers' interests
- Alliances: United Religious Front (1949–51); Religious Torah Front (1955–60, 1973–77)
- Most MKs: 3 (1949–51, 1959–61)
- Fewest MKs: 1 (1977–81)

Election symbol

Poalei Agudat Yisrael (Hebrew: פועלי אגודת ישראל, lit. 'Workers of the Society of Israel') was a trade union and Jewish political party in the Second Polish Republic and a minor political party in Israel. It was also known as PAI or PAGI, its Hebrew abbreviation (Hebrew: פאג״י or פא״י).

== History ==
Poalei Agudas Izrael was founded in 1922 in Lodz, Poland as a workers affiliate of Agudas Izrael of Poland. As well as being a trade union, they fielded candidates in the Polish elections in the interwar period.

With the establishment of the State of Israel, Poalei Agudat Yisrael became an ultra-orthodox workers' political party associated with Agudat Yisrael. They were also part of the Histadrut.

In the elections for the first Knesset, the party ran on a joint list with the other religious parties of the time, Agudat Yisrael, Mizrachi and Hapoel HaMizrachi. The group was called the United Religious Front and won 16 seats. They joined David Ben-Gurion's coalition government alongside Mapai, the Progressive Party, the Sephardim and Oriental Communities and the Democratic List of Nazareth.

However, the grouping created problems in the governing coalition due to its differing attitude to education in the new immigrant camps and the religious education system. They also demanded that Ben-Gurion close the Supply and Rationing Ministry and appoint a businessman as Minister for Trade and Industry. As a result, Ben-Gurion resigned on 15 October 1950. After the differences were resolved, Ben-Gurion formed the second government on 1 November 1950, with the United Religious Front retaining its place in the coalition.

In the 1951 elections, the United Religious Front disbanded into its separate parties, and Poalei Agudat Yisrael fought the election alone. They won two seats and were included in Ben-Gurion's coalition. However, they helped bring down the third government after disagreeing with Ben-Gurion on religious education issues. They were not included in the fourth, fifth or sixth governments.

For the 1955 elections, the party joined with Agudat Yisrael to form the Religious Torah Front, which won six seats. They did not participate in the coalitions of the sixth or seventh governments.

In the 1959 elections they once again ran under the Religious Torah Front banner, which won six seats. Again, they did not join the governing coalition. On 9 August 1960 the alliance split, with Poalei Agudat Yisrael taking two of the six seats. After the split, Poalei Agudat Yisrael joined the coalition and Binyamin Mintz was made Minister of Postal Services.

In the 1961 election the party retained its two seats, and were coalition partners in the ninth, tenth and eleventh governments. In the 1965 election they again won two seats and joined the twelfth government, which collapsed when Levi Eshkol died. Poalei Agudat Yisrael left the coalition when Golda Meir took over as leader of the thirteenth government. In the 1969 elections the party retained its two seats, but did not join the governing coalition.

For the 1973 elections the party joined with Agudat Yisrael again to recreate the Religious Torah Front, which won five seats. However, the faction split on 15 March 1977, with Poalei Agudat Yisrael taking two of the five seats. In the 1977 elections the party won only one seat. In the next elections in 1981 it failed to cross the electoral threshold by 2,284 votes.

The party's name was briefly resuscitated during the eleventh Knesset when Morasha, part of the governing coalition, split and former Poalei Agudat Yisrael member Avraham Verdiger renamed his faction Morasha – Poalei Agudat Yisrael. He merged the party into Agudat Yisrael before the 1988 elections.

== Knesset members ==
Knesset (MKs)	Knesset members
1 (1949–1951) (3)	Kalman Kahana, Binyamin Mintz, Avraham-Yehuda Goldrat
2 (1951–1955) (2)	Kalman Kahana, Binyamin Mintz
3 (1955–1959) (3)	Kalman Kahana, Binyamin Mintz, Ya'akov Katz
4 (1959–1961) (3)	Kalman Kahana, Ya'akov Katz, Binyamin Mintz (replaced Shlomo-Ya'akov Gross of Agudat Yisrael)
5 (1961–1965) (2)	Kalman Kahana, Ya'akov Katz
6 (1965–1969) (2)	Kalman Kahana, Ya'akov Katz (replaced by Avraham Verdiger)
7 (1969–1974) (2)	Kalman Kahana, Avraham Verdiger
8 (1974–1977) (2)	Kalman Kahana, Avraham Verdiger
9 (1977–1981) (1)	Kalman Kahana

== Affiliated kibbutzim ==
Not to be confused with the Religious Kibbutz Movement, Poalei Agudat Yisrael had two affiliated kibbutzim, Hafetz Haim and Sha'alvim.

== See also ==
- Politics of Israel
