= 1955 Israeli legislative election =

- 26 July 1955
- Turnout: 82.83%
Party	Leader	Vote %	Seats	+/–
Mapai	David Ben-Gurion	32.20	40	−5
Herut	Menachem Begin	12.56	15	+7
General Zionists	Israel Rokach	10.21	13	−7
National Religious Front	Haim-Moshe Shapira	9.13	11	+1
Ahdut HaAvoda	Yitzhak Tabenkin	8.14	10	New
Mapam	Meir Ya'ari	7.31	9	−6
Religious Torah Front	Yitzhak-Meir Levin	4.67	6	+1
Maki	Shmuel Mikunis	4.51	6	+1
Progressive Party	Pinchas Rosen	4.41	5	+1
Democratic List for Israeli Arabs	Seif el-Din el-Zoubi	1.81	2	−1
Progress and Work	Salah-Hassan Hanifes	1.47	2	+1
Agriculture and Development	Faras Hamdan	1.15	1	0
This lists parties that won seats. See the complete results below.
Prime Minister before	Prime Minister after
Moshe Sharett; Mapai	David Ben-Gurion; Mapai

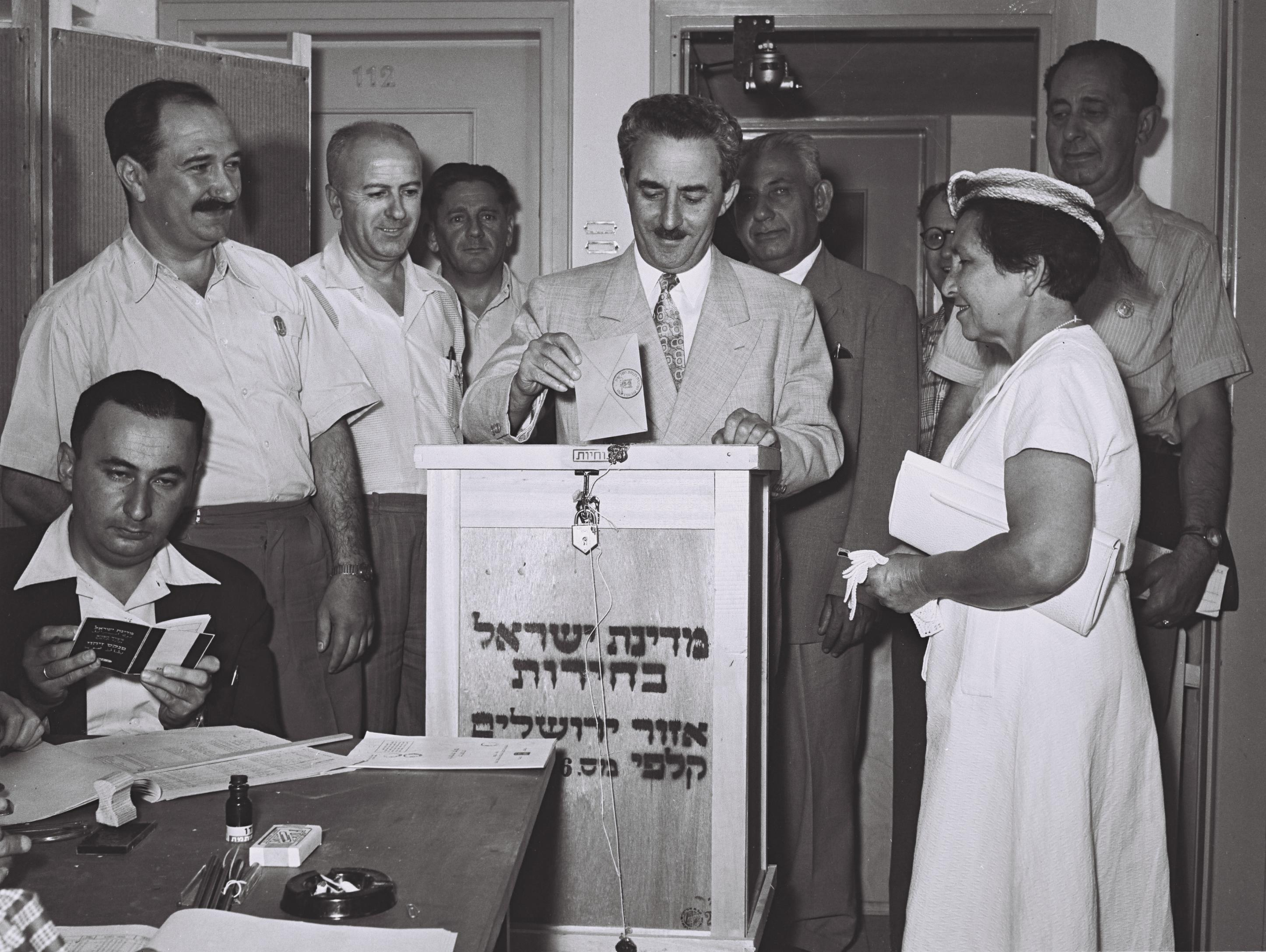
Prime minister Moshe Sharett votes

Legislative elections were held in Israel on 26 July 1955 to elect the members of the third Knesset. Voter turnout was 83%.

== Parliament factions ==
The table below lists the parliamentary factions represented in the 2nd Knesset.

Name	Ideology	Symbol	Leader	1951 result		Seats at 1954 dissolution
Name	Ideology	Symbol	Leader	Votes (%)	Seats	Seats at 1954 dissolution
Mapai	Social democracy Labor Zionism	א	David Ben-Gurion	37.3%	45 / 120	47 / 120
General Zionists	Liberalism	צ	Israel Rokach	16.2%	20 / 120	22 / 120
Mapam	Labor Zionism; Marxism	מ	Meir Ya'ari	12.5%	15 / 120	7 / 120
Hapoel HaMizrachi	Religious Zionism	ו	Haim-Moshe Shapira	6.8%	8 / 120	8 / 120
Herut	Revisionist Zionism	ח	Menachem Begin	6.6%	8 / 120	8 / 120
Maki	Communism	ק	Shmuel Mikunis	4.0%	5 / 120	7 / 120
Ahdut HaAvoda	Labor Zionism	תו	Yitzhak-Meir Levin	-	0 / 120	4 / 120
Progressive Party	Liberalism; Progressivism	פ	Pinchas Rosen	3.2%	4 / 120	4 / 120
Democratic List for Israeli Arabs	Arab satellite list	יד	Seif el-Din el-Zoubi	2.0%	3 / 120	3 / 120
Agudat Yisrael	Religious conservatism	ג	Yitzhak-Meir Levin	2.0%	3 / 120	3 / 120
Sephardim and Oriental Communities	Sephardic and Mizrahi interests	סצ	Eliyahu Elyashar	1.8%	2 / 120	0 / 120
Poalei Agudat Yisrael	Religious conservatism	ד	Binyamin Mintz	1.6%	2 / 120	2 / 120
Mizrachi	Religious Zionism	ב	David-Zvi Pinkas	1.5%	2 / 120	2 / 120
Progress and Work	Arab satellite list	נ	Salah-Hassan Hanifes	1.2%	1 / 120	1 / 120
Yemenite Association	Yemenite Jewish interest	ל	Shimon Garidi	1.2%	1 / 120	1 / 120
Agriculture and Development	Arab satellite list	ע	Faras Hamdan	1.1%	1 / 120	1 / 120

== Results ==
Mapai retained its plurality in the Knesset, although its share of the vote dropped by 5.1 and its share of seats dropped from 47 (at the end of the Second Knesset) to 40. Meanwhile, Herut overtook the General Zionists, Mapam, and Hapoel HaMizrachi to become the second-largest party, with its share of seats nearly doubling (from 8 in the Second Knesset to 15 in the Third).

The Third Knesset is notable for being the only Knesset thus far in which none of the represented parties merged or split (although two parties did change their names) and no MKs switched parties, making it the most stable Knesset in Israel's history.

Party	Votes	%	Seats	+/–
Mapai	274,735	32.20	40	−5
Herut	107,190	12.56	15	+7
General Zionists	87,099	10.21	13	−7
National Religious Front	77,936	9.13	11	+1
Ahdut HaAvoda	69,475	8.14	10	New
Mapam	62,401	7.31	9	−6
Religious Torah Front	39,836	4.67	6	+1
Maki	38,492	4.51	6	+1
Progressive Party	37,661	4.41	5	+1
Democratic List for Israeli Arabs	15,475	1.81	2	−1
Progress and Work	12,511	1.47	2	+1
Agriculture and Development	9,791	1.15	1	0
Sephardim and Oriental Communities	6,994	0.82	0	−2
Arab List – The Centre	4,484	0.53	0	New
Likud – Popular Economic Movement	3,044	0.36	0	New
Yemenite Association	2,459	0.29	0	−1
Original Religious List	2,448	0.29	0	New
New Immigrants' List	1,188	0.14	0	New
Total	853,219	100.00	120	0
Valid votes	853,219	97.38		
Invalid/blank votes	22,969	2.62		
Total votes	876,188	100.00		
Registered voters/turnout	1,057,795	82.83		
Source: CEC, Nohlen et al.

== Aftermath ==
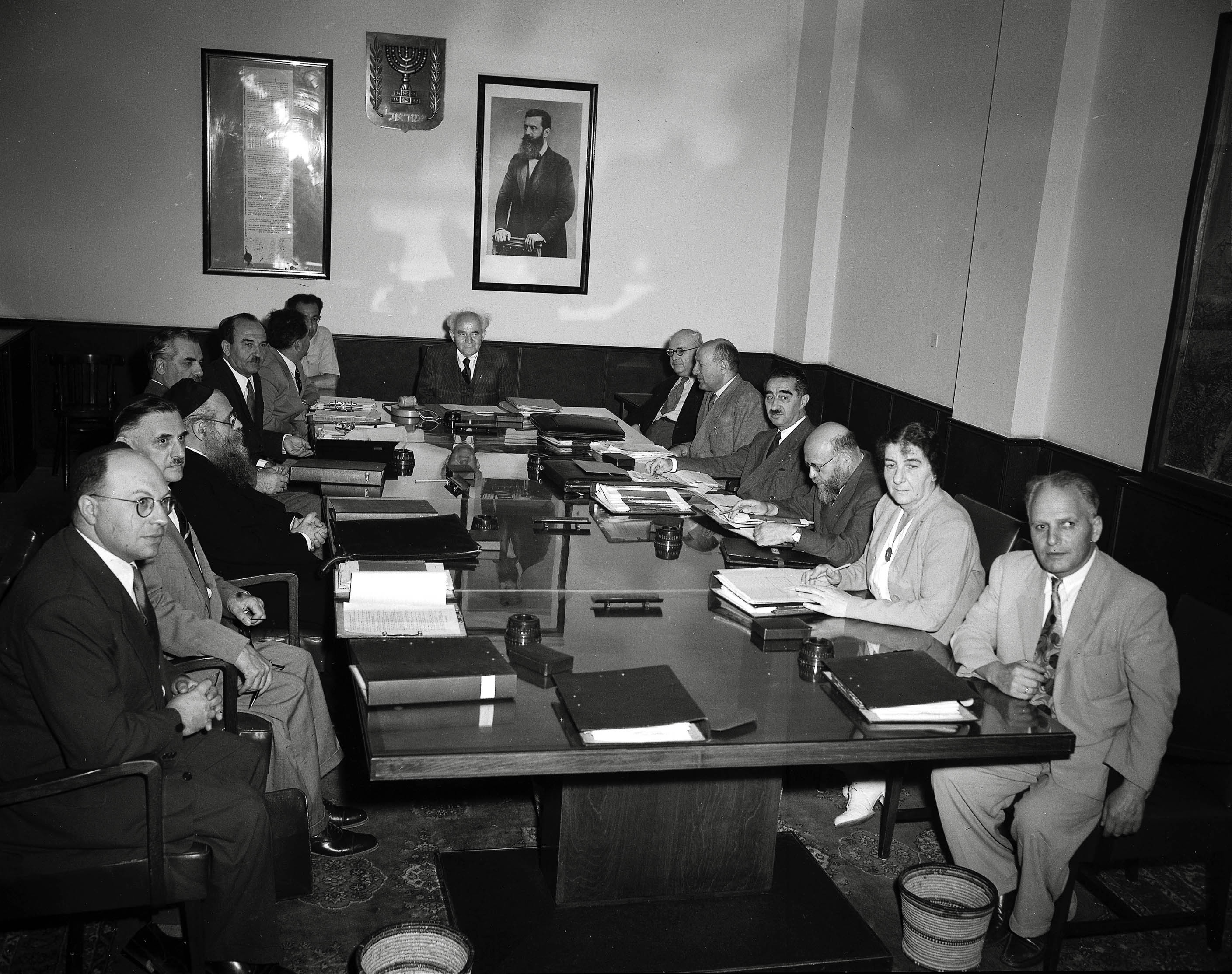
Golda Meir at first session of the Third Knesset (1951)

Unlike the second Knesset, the third Knesset was one of the most stable in Israel's history. There were only two governments, and it was the only Knesset to date during which none of the parties split or merged. As with the first and second Knesset, the speaker was Yosef Sprinzak until his death on 28 January 1959. He was replaced by Ahdut HaAvoda's Nahum Nir.

=== Seventh government ===
The third Knesset started with David Ben-Gurion forming the seventh government of Israel (the previous two Knessets had six governments; two in the first and four in the second) on 3 November 1955. His Mapai party formed a coalition with the National Religious Front (which later changed its name to the National Religious Party), Mapam, the Progressive Party, Ahdut HaAvoda, and the three Israeli Arab parties, the Democratic List for Israeli Arabs, Progress and Work, Agriculture and Development. The government had 16 ministers. It collapsed when Ben-Gurion resigned on 31 December 1957 over the leaking of information from ministerial meetings.

=== Eighth government ===
Ben-Gurion formed the eighth government a week later on 7 January 1958 with the same coalition partners. The number of ministers remained the same. The eighth government collapsed when Ben-Gurion resigned again on 5 July 1959 after Labour Unity and Mapam had voted against the government on the issue of selling arms to West Germany and refused to leave the coalition. Elections for the fourth Knesset were called for 3 November 1959.
