= Faction independent of Ahdut HaAvoda =

Independent Ahdut HaAvoda faction Ahdut HaAvoda Workers' Party סיעה בלתי תלויה באחדות העבודה מפלגת הפועלים לאחדות העבודה
- Leader: David Livschitz; Hannah Lamdan
- Founded: 28 February 1952
- Dissolved: 13 January 1954
- Split from: Mapam
- Merged into: Mapai
- Membership (1954): 150
- Ideology: Labor Zionism; Democratic socialism
- Political position: Left-wing
- Most MKs: 2 (1952–1954)
- Fewest MKs: 2 (1952–1954)

The Independent Ahdut HaAvoda faction (Hebrew: סיעה בלתי תלויה באחדות העבודה, Sia Bilti Talouya BeAhdut HaAvoda), later renamed as the Ahdut HaAvoda Workers' Party (Hebrew: מפלגת הפועלים לאחדות העבודה, Mifleget HaPoalim LeAhdut HaAvoda), as was a short-lived political party in Israel.

== History ==
Mapai, the leading social-democratic party in Mandatory Palestine, had a leftist 'Faction B' that split off to recreate Ahdut HaAvoda in 1944. This new party merged with the Hashomer Hatzair Workers Party in January 1948 to form Mapam. Two politicians of 'Faction B', Hannah Lamdan and David Livschitz, entered the Knesset with Mapam after the 1951 elections.

The new party was not internally harmonious, and Livschitz was expelled in February 1952 over a dispute with the former Hashomer Hatzair members. Lamdan left the party over the dispute. Together, they created a new faction, known as the 'Independent Ahdut HaAvoda faction'. The Knesset authorised the faction on 4 March 1952. This was the first split from the crisis-stricken Mapam.

The two were criticised for being 'too early' in their decision to split. Political analysts said that if "they had waited longer", they would have convinced all of Ahdut HaAvoda – as well as their affiliated kibbutz organisation, HaKibbutz HaMeuchad – to secede (a notion that would be proven correct two years later with the reformation of the Ahdut HaAvoda party).

In June 1952, the faction was transformed into the Ahdut HaAvoda Workers' Party at its founding conference. Aside from the co-leaders, another prominent figure in the party was journalist Mendel Singer. The new party was ideologically situated between Mapai and Mapam.

Mapam was shaken in the aftermath of the Prague Trials. The show trials in which mostly Jewish leaders of the Communist Party of Czechoslovakia were purged, falsely implicated Mapam's envoy in Prague, Mordechai Oren, as part of a Zionist conspiracy. This, and later Nikita Khrushchev's Secret Speech at the 20th Party Congress in the Soviet Union, led to Mapam moving away from some of their more radical left wing positions, and towards democratic socialism.

Factional dissent within the party reached an all-time high. On the party's far left, Rostam Bastuni, Avraham Berman and Moshe Sneh were expelled and the three established the Left Faction.

By the end of 1953, the merger talks between the Workers' Party and Mapai had become public. Mapai offered to put Livschitz on a safe spot in their next election list, and a place on the party committee. The faction ceased to exist on 13 January 1954 after Lamdan and Livschitz both joined the larger party.

On 23 August 1954, Moshe Aram, Yisrael Bar-Yehuda, Yitzhak Ben-Aharon and Aharon Zisling broke away from Mapam to re-establish Ahdut HaAvoda – Poale Zion. Lamdan and Livschitz did not join this party, remaining in Mapai. Ahdut HaAvoda – Poale Zion lasted until 1968, when it merged with Mapai and Rafi to become the Israeli Labor Party. Lamdan and Livschitz later followed former Mapai leader David Ben-Gurion into the Rafi party in 1965.
