= Amin-Salim Jarjora =

Israeli Arab Christian politician (1886-1975)

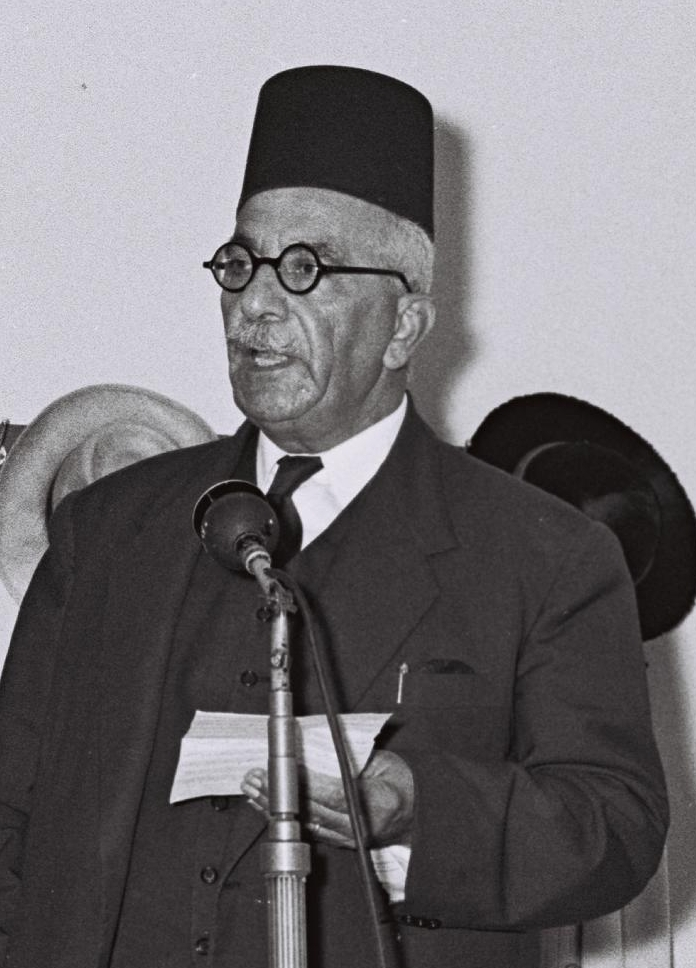

Faction represented in the Knesset
- 1949–1951: Democratic List of Nazareth

Personal details
- Born: 12 October 1886 Nazareth, Ottoman Empire
- Died: 20 August 1975 (aged 88) Nazareth, Israel

Amin-Salim Jarjora (Arabic: أمين سليم جرجورة, Hebrew: אָמִין־סָלִים גָ׳רְג׳וֹרַה; 12 October 1886 – 20 August 1975) was an Israeli Arab politician who served as a member of the Knesset for the Democratic List of Nazareth between 1949 and 1951.

== Biography ==
Born in Nazareth to a Christian Arab family, Jarjora attended law school in Jerusalem. A teacher at the Russian School in his hometown, he served in the Ottoman Army during World War I. After the war he taught at Rashidiya school in Jerusalem between 1922 and 1926. He also worked as a lawyer in Haifa and Nazareth.

In the first Knesset elections in 1949, Jarjora was placed second on the Democratic List of Nazareth party, which won two seats. He was placed second on the Agriculture and Development list for the 1951 elections, losing his seat as the party won only one seat.

He became mayor of Nazareth in 1954, a position he held until 1959.

Political offices
| Preceded by Yousef Muhammad Ali Fahoum | Mayor of Nazareth; 1954–1959 | Succeeded by Seif el-Din el-Zoubi |
