= Faras Hamdan =

Israeli-Arab politician (1910-1966)

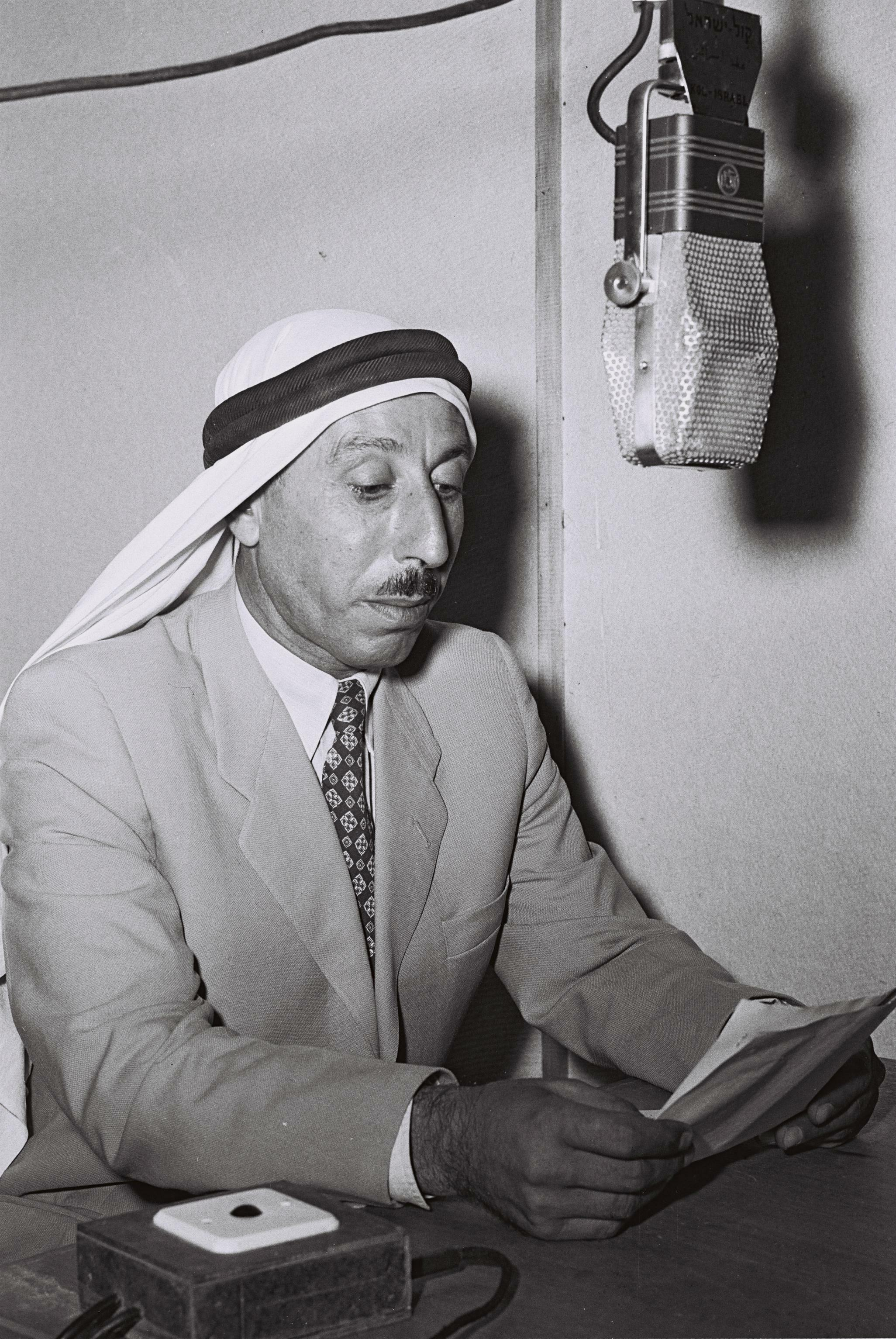
- Hamdan in 1952

Faction represented in the Knesset
- 1951–1959: Agriculture and Development

Personal details
- Born: 1910 Baqa al-Gharbiyye, Ottoman Empire
- Died: 29 November 1966 (aged 55–56)

Faras Hamdan (Arabic: فارس حمدان, Hebrew: פארס חמדאן; 1910 – 29 November 1966) was an Israeli Arab politician who served as a member of the Knesset for the Agriculture and Development party between 1951 and 1959.

== Biography ==
Hamdan was born in Baqa al-Gharbiyye during the Ottoman era. In 1944, he was elected head of local council of his village, where he later established a citrus confectionery factory.

In 1951, he was elected to the Knesset as head of the Agriculture and Development list, which was associated with the ruling Mapai party. The party joined David Ben-Gurion's government, but Hamdan did not receive a ministerial portfolio.

He was re-elected in 1955, and again joined the governing coalition. For the 1959 elections, the party was headed by Mahmud A-Nashaf. It won only one seat and Hamdan lost his place in the Knesset.

He died in 1966.
