= Mayor of Nazareth =

Head of the executive branch of the government of Nazareth, Israel

- רֹאשׁ עִירִיַּת נָצְרַת
- Coat of Arms of Nazareth
- Incumbent; Yaakov Efrati since 24 June 2025
- Residence: Tawfiq Ziad St., Nazareth, Israel
- Term length: 5 years
- Formation: 1875

The Mayor of Nazareth is the head of the executive branch of the political system in Nazareth, Israel. The mayor's office administers all city services, public property, most public agencies, and enforces city and state laws. The term of office is five years.

The municipality was established for the first time in 1875, during the Ottoman Empire period, and since then it has had twelve mayors, including eight after the establishment of the State of Israel, in addition to three temporary committees in three different periods.

== List of mayors ==
	Mayor	Took office	Left office	Party
1	Tanous Kawar	1875	1885	
2	Ali al-As'ad al-Zaydani	1889	1892	
3	Salim Bishara	1924	1948	
4	Yousef Muhammad Ali Fahoum	11 May 1948	30 June 1954	
5	Amin-Salim Jarjora	15 July 1954	24 October 1959	Democratic List of Nazareth
6	Seif el-Din el-Zoubi	28 December 1959	20 December 1965	Democratic List for Israeli Arabs
7	Abd el-Aziz el-Zoubi	21 December 1965	2 May 1966	Mapam
–	Committee	3 May 1966	18 December 1967	Independent
8	Musa Ketelli	19 December 1967	3 March 1971	
9	Seif el-Din el-Zoubi	5 May 1971	13 May 1974	Progress and Development
–	Committee	14 May 1974	9 December 1975	Independent
10	Tawfiq Ziad	9 December 1975	5 July 1994	Communist Party of Israel
11	Ramiz Jaraisy	4 August 1994	11 March 2014	Hadash
12	Ali Sallam	11 March 2014	23 June 2025	My Nazareth
–	Yaakov Efrati (Note: Head of an appointed committee.)	24 June 2025	present	Independent

== Sources ==
- Kanje, Fadel (2016). Transhumances interculturelles d'un Arabe de Nazareth (in French). Paris: L'Hartmann. ISBN 978-2-343-10202-3.
