= Hannah Lamdan =

Israeli politician (1905–1995)

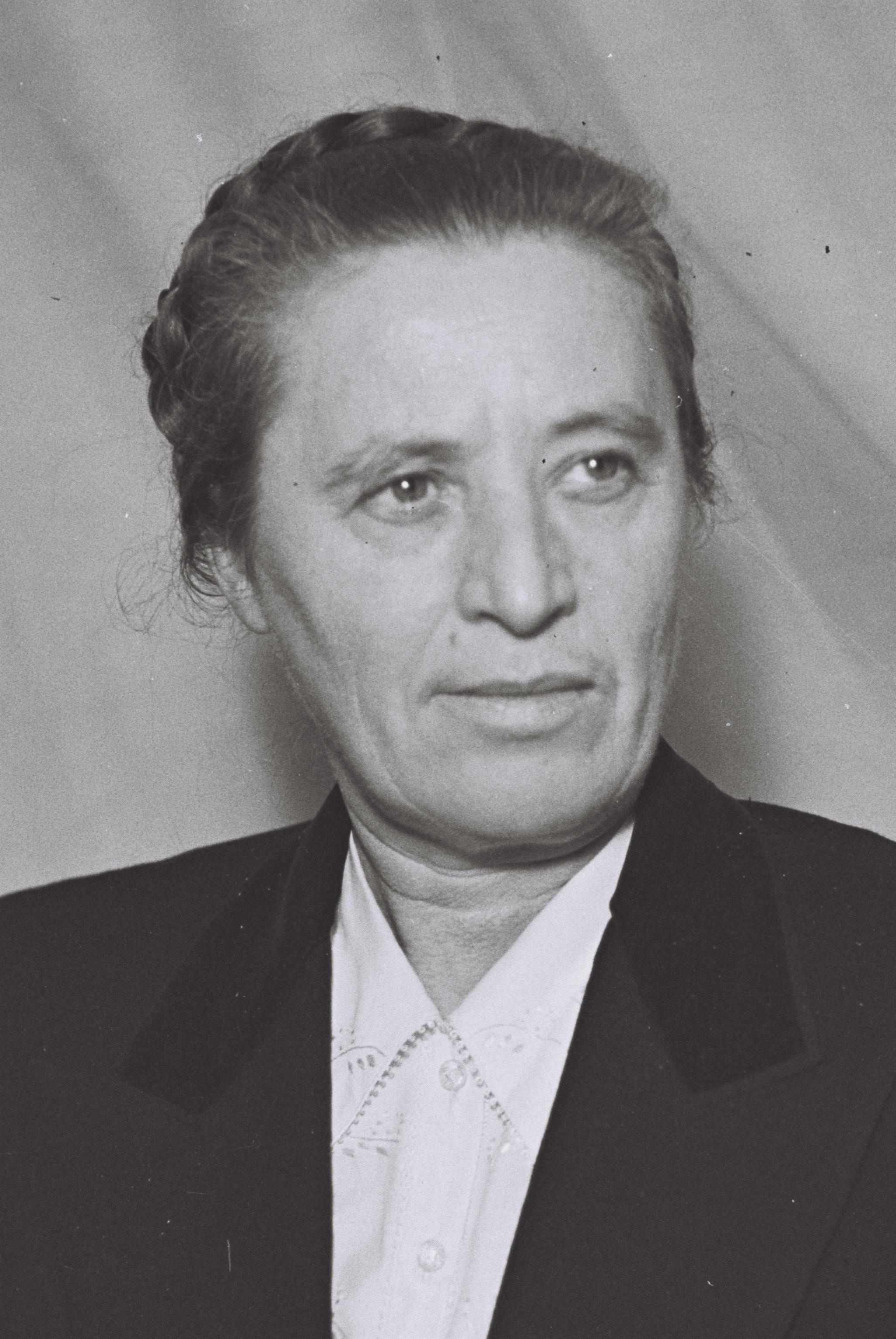
- Lamdan in 1951

Faction represented in the Knesset
- 1949–1952: Mapam
- 1952–1954: Independent Ahdut HaAvoda
- 1954–1965: Mapai
- 1965: Rafi

Personal details
- Born: 5 January 1905 Shyrivtsi, Russian Empire
- Died: 10 April 1995 (aged 90) Holon, Israel

Hannah Lamdan (Hebrew: חנה למדן; 5 January 1905 – 10 April 1995) was an Israeli politician who served as a member of the Knesset for several left-wing parties between 1949 and 1965.

== Biography ==
Born Hannah Lerner in Shyrivtsi, Khotinsky Uyezd, Bessarabia Governorate, Russian Empire (today Ukraine), Lamdan attended a Hebrew language primary school and a Russian language high school before emigrating to Mandatory Palestine in 1926, where she became a member of Hashomer Hatzair youth movement. She joined the Ahdut HaAvoda political party and was an activist for the Histadrut trade union. After her election to the Tel Aviv workers council she headed the Women Workers department from 1937 to 1940. Between 1944 and 1949 she was a member of the Women Workers Council's secretariat.

In 1948 Lamdan joined Mapam. In 1949 she was elected to the Constituent Assembly. She was re-elected to the Knesset in 1951 but in February 1952 she left the party to join her ally, David Livschitz, in creating the Independent Ahdut HaAvoda faction (before the re-establishment of Ahdut HaAvoda). On 13 January 1954 the party folded into Mapai.

She lost her seat in the 1955 elections but returned to the Knesset on 31 July 1957 as a replacement for Ehud Avriel, who had resigned as an MK to become an ambassador. She retained her seat in the 1959 elections, but lost it again in 1961. However, she returned again as a replacement for the deceased Giora Yoseftal on 23 August 1962.

On 14 July 1965 she was amongst the eight MKs to leave Mapai, led by David Ben-Gurion, to establish Rafi. She lost her seat in the elections later that year.

Lamdan died in Holon in April 1995.
