= David Livschitz =

Israeli politician

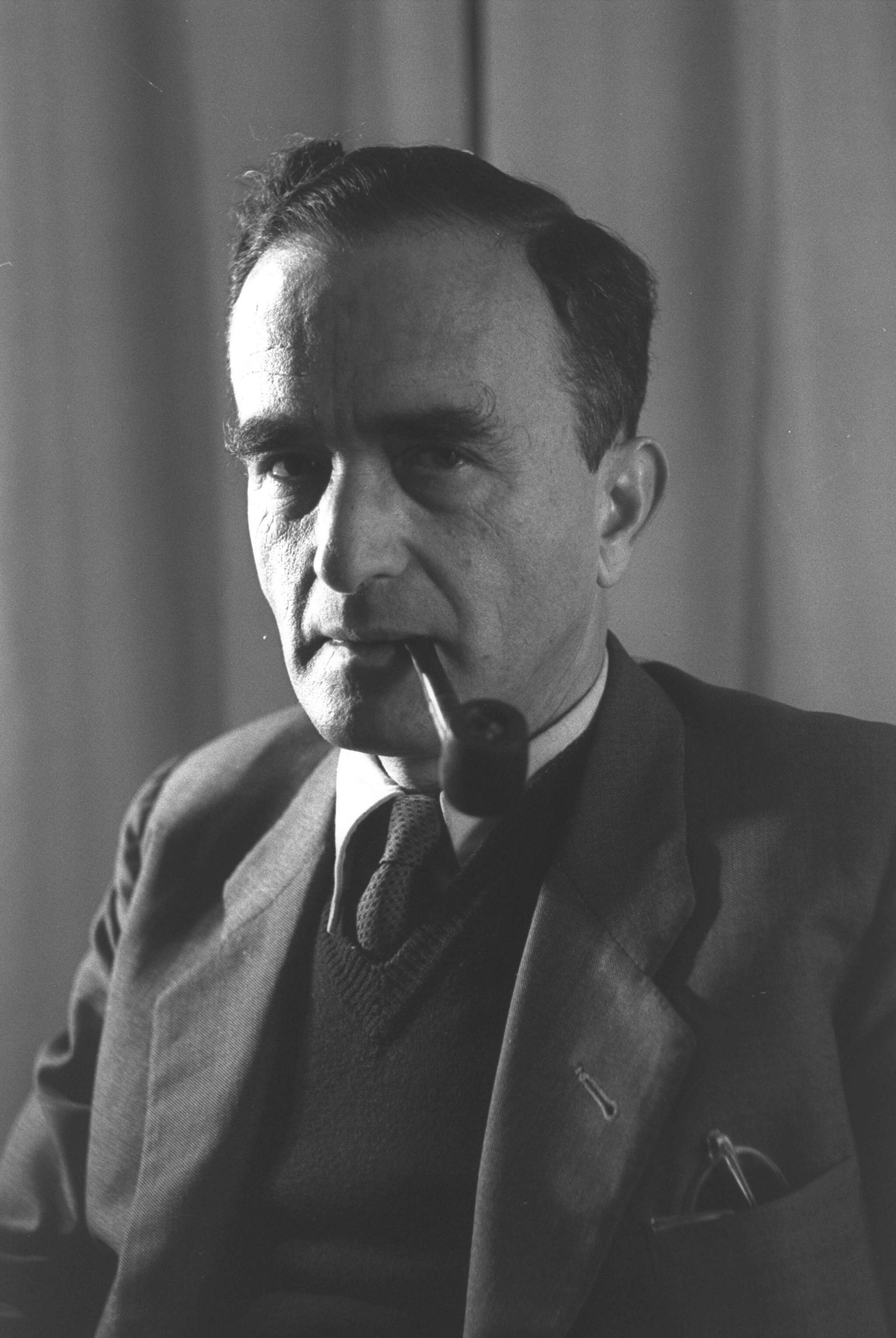
- Livschitz in the 1950s

Faction represented in the Knesset
- 1951–1952: Mapam
- 1952–1954: Independent Ahdut HaAvoda
- 1954–1959: Mapai

Personal details
- Born: 12 May 1897 Zhitomir, Russian Empire
- Died: 30 October 1973 (aged 76)

David Livschitz (Hebrew: דָּוִד לִיבְשִׁיץ; 12 May 1897 – 30 October 1973) was a Russia-born Israeli politician who served as a member of the Knesset for Mapam, the Faction independent of Ahdut HaAvoda and Mapai between 1951 and 1959.

== Biography ==
Born in Zhitomir in the Volhynia Governorate of the Russian Empire, Livschitz was a member of the Dror and HeHalutz youth movements in Poland. In 1925, he joined the World Union of Poale Zion and Socialist Zionists. Between 1927 and 1937 he was a leader of Poale Zion in France, and was also editor of the party's publications.

In 1938 he emigrated to Mandatory Palestine, where he became secretary of Mapai in Tel Aviv. In 1944, he joined the party's B Faction, and in 1948 joined Mapam, having been a member of the Assembly of Representatives. He narrowly missed out on being elected to the first Knesset on the Mapam list in 1949, but entered the Knesset as a replacement for Yitzhak Tabenkin on 12 April 1951.

He retained his seat in the July 1951 elections, but in February 1952, he was expelled from Mapam over a faction dispute with Hashomer Hatzair affiliates. Hannah Lamdan broke away from the party to join him in forming the Independent Ahdut HaAvoda faction (Ahdut HaAvoda had not been re-established yet). On 13 January 1954 the party merged into Mapai.

Livschitz was re-elected in 1955, but lost his seat in the 1959 elections. He died on 30 October 1973.
