= Central Committee of Polish Jews =

Jewish political committee in post-war Poland

Central Committee of Polish Jews Centralny Komitet Żydów w Polsce
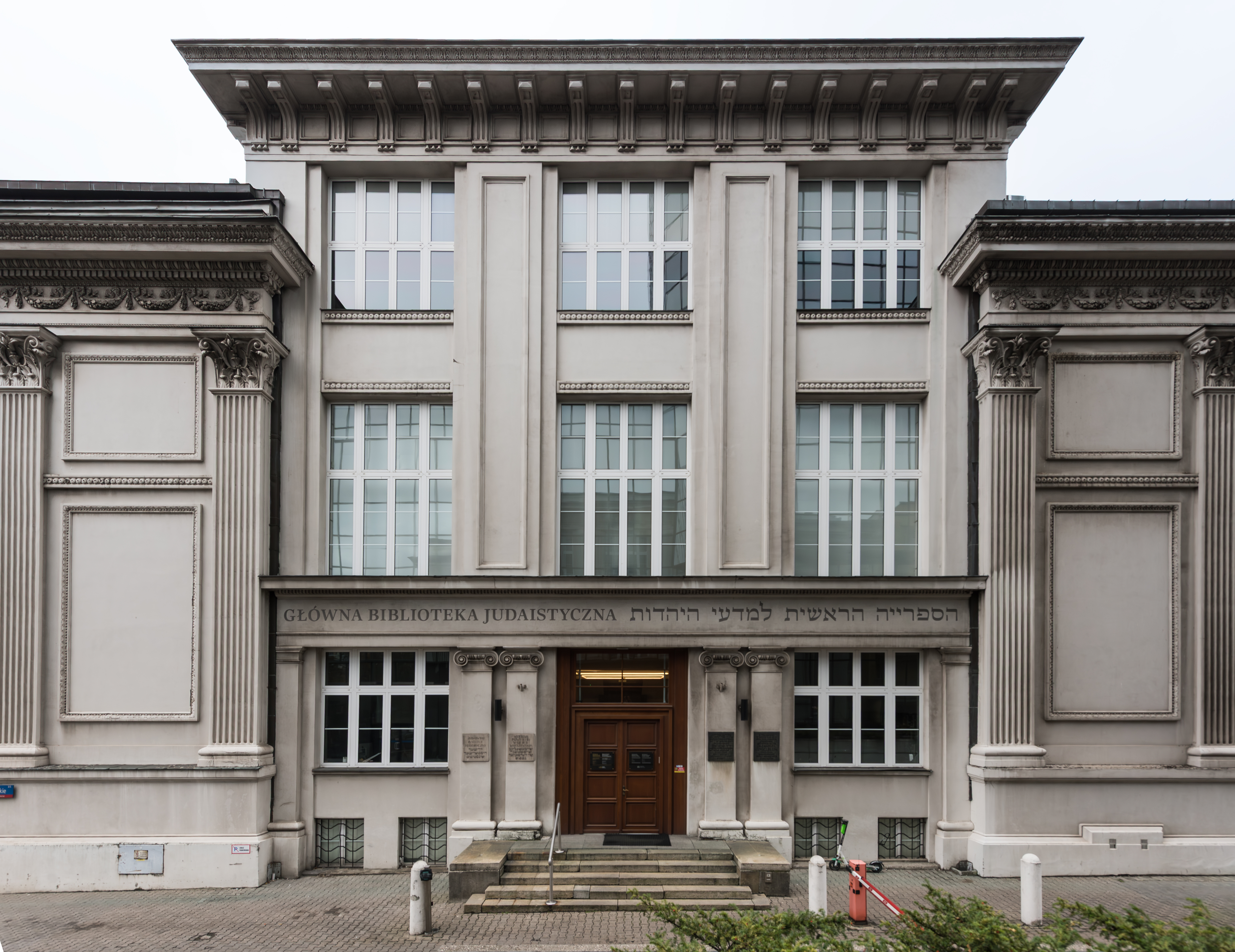
- Headquarters of the Jewish Historical Institute in Warsaw, holding the entire archives of CKŻP

Operation
- Founded: 12 November 1944; 81 years ago
- Reformed: 1950, as Towarzystwo Społeczno-Kulturalne Żydów w Polsce (pl)
- Location: Warsaw

The Central Committee of Polish Jews also referred to as the Central Committee of Jews in Poland and abbreviated CKŻP, (Polish: Centralny Komitet Żydów w Polsce, Yiddish: צענטראלער קאמיטעט פון די יידן אין פוילן, romanized: Tsentraler Komitet fun di Yidn in Poyln) was a state-sponsored political representation of Jews in Poland at the end of World War II. It was established on 12 November 1944, as the successor of the Provisional Central Committee of Polish Jews formed a month earlier under the umbrella of the communist Polish Committee of National Liberation (PKWN). The CKŻP provided care and assistance to Jews who survived the Holocaust. It legally represented all CKŻP-registered Polish Jews in their dealings with the new government and its agencies. It existed until 1950 when, together with the Jewish Cultural Society, representatives of CKŻP founded the Socio-Cultural Association of Jews in Poland.

The committee was instrumental in organizing and implementing the Jewish aliyah efforts to British Mandate for Palestine, and from mid May 1948, to the newly formed State of Israel. The workers of CKŻP registered 86,000 survivors in January 1946 from across the prewar Polish Second Republic. By the end of summer, the number Jews who signed up had risen to about 205,000–210,000 (240,000 registrations with over 30,000 duplicates). Well over 100,000 refugees (or, about 180,000 according to Engel), many with working knowledge of Yiddish, came to PRL from the Soviet Union thanks to a Polish–Soviet repatriation agreement. Gen. Spychalski signed a decree allowing them to leave Poland without visas or exit permits. Poland was the only Eastern Bloc country to do so. By the spring of 1947, helped by CKŻP over 150,000 Jews emigrated (additional number, outside of that period). To secure their release, CKŻP collected group testimonies, nevertheless, the Polish decree was easily approved by the Kremlin, seeking to undermine the British influence in the Middle East. The emigration of Jews (known as Berihah) was motivated by the destruction of Jewish life in Poland and anti-Jewish violence in Poland, the best known incident being the Kielce pogrom.

== Organization ==
The member composition of the Central Committee was drafted in June 1946 on the basis of a compromise between the already functioning Jewish political parties legalized in the Soviet-controlled People's Republic. Accordingly: six seats were given to Jewish communists (the Jewish faction of the Polish Workers' Party), four seats to Bund representatives, four seats to Ihud, three seats to Poale Zion Left (leftist faction of Poale Zion), three to Poale Zion Right, and one place to Hashomer Hatzair. The CKŻP had established nine provincial and seven regional chapters across Poland. Białystok branch of the Central Committee was run by Szymon Datner. The committee was chaired by Emil Sommerstein of Ihud, who was replaced in 1946 by Adolf Berman from Poale Zion Left. Berman was succeeded in 1949 by Hersh Smolar, official representative of the Polish United Workers' Party in CKŻP. The Central Committee of Polish Jews was discontinued on 29 October 1950 and, a new organization was formed, Towarzystwo Społeczno-Kulturalne Żydów w Polsce (TSKŻ), which at present, is the biggest Jewish organization in Poland with 17 regional chapters.
