= Progress and Work =

Progress and Work الزراعة والتطوير קדמה ועבודה
- Leader: Salah-Hassan Hanifes
- Merged into: Peace List
- Ideology: Israeli Arab interest
- National affiliation: Mapai (until 1959)
- Most MKs: 2 (1955–1959)
- Fewest MKs: 1 (1951–1955)

Election symbol
- נ

Progress and Work (Arabic: الزراعة والتطوير, Hebrew: קִדְמָה וְעֲבוֹדָה, Kidma VeAvoda) was an Arab satellite list in Israel.

== History ==
The Progress and Work party was formed to contest the 1951 elections. Like most other Arab parties at the time, it was associated with David Ben-Gurion's Mapai party, as Ben Gurion was keen to include Israeli Arabs in the functioning of the state in order to prove Jews and Arabs could co-exist peacefully and productively.

In the elections, the party won only one seat, taken by its leader, Salah-Hassan Hanifes. Because of its association with Mapai, the party joined the governing coalition in all four governments of the second Knesset.

In the 1955 elections, the party won two seats. Saleh Suleiman took the second seat, and the party was again part of the coalition.

In 1959 a falling-out between Hanifes and Mapai led to Hanifes setting up a new party, the Independent Faction for Israeli Arabs, to fight the 1959 elections. Both parties failed to cross the electoral threshold, with Progress and Work receiving 0.5% of the vote and the Independent Faction 0.4%.

In the 1961 elections, the party received 0.4% of the vote. After its second failure to cross the threshold, the party disappeared.
