= Rostam Bastuni =

Israeli politician and journalist

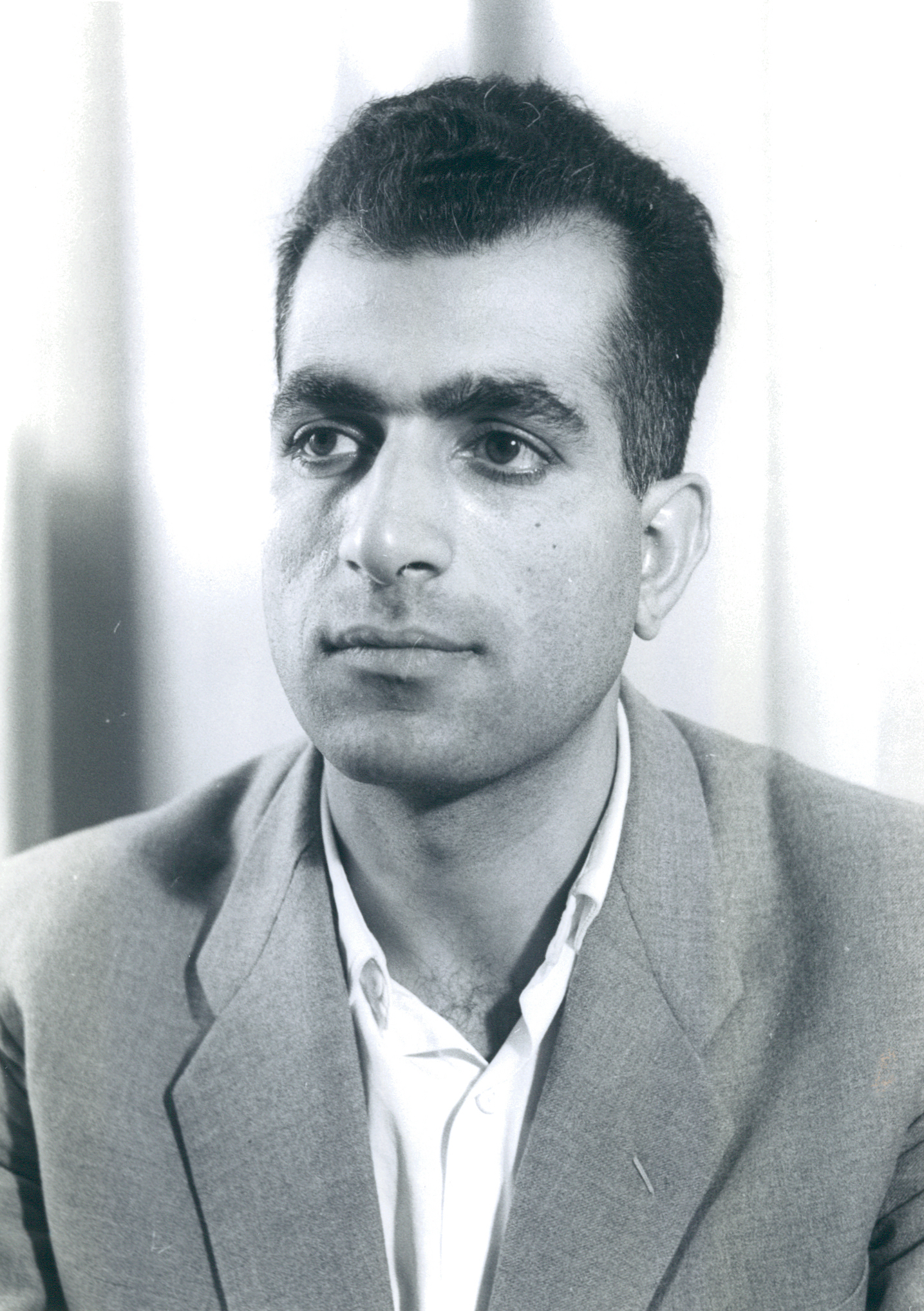
- Bastuni in the 1950s

Faction represented in the Knesset
- 1951–1952: Mapam
- 1952–1954: Left Faction
- 1954–1955: Mapam

Personal details
- Born: 15 March 1923 Haifa, Mandatory Palestine
- Died: 26 April 1994 (aged 71)

Rostam Bastuni (Arabic: رستم بستوني, Hebrew: רוסתם בסתוני; 15 March 1923 – 26 April 1994) was an Israeli politician and journalist, and the first Israeli Arab to represent a Zionist party in the Knesset.

== Biography ==
Bastuni was born in Haifa to a family originally from al-Tira. He attended the Technion, graduating with a degree in architecture, going on to become a teacher.

Bastuni joined the Arab branch of Mapam, and rose through the party ranks. Prior to the Constituent Assembly elections in 1949 he was placed eighth on the list of the Popular Arab Bloc, a Mapam satellite list, but it failed to win a seat. However, Bastuni served as the Mapam secretary during the Assembly's term. He also edited the Arabic edition of Mapam's weekly magazine, Al-Fajar.

Prior to the 1951 Knesset elections he was placed tenth on the Mapam list, entering the Knesset as the party won 15 seats and becoming the first Israeli Arab to represent a Zionist party (three Arab MKs had served in the first Knesset, but none of them for Zionist parties; one had been a member of the communist Maki and the other two were members of an Arab party, the Democratic List of Nazareth).

During his first Knesset term, internal divisions over the Slánský trial led to Mapam splitting. On 20 February 1951, Bastuni left the party and set up the Left Faction with Adolf Berman and Moshe Sneh. However, whilst Berman and Sneh went on to join Maki, Bastuni returned to Mapam on 1 November 1954.

Bastuni lost his seat in the 1955 elections and did not return to the Knesset. In 1963 his nephew Hassan Boustouni became the first Arab to play in the top tier of Israeli football when he debuted for Liga Leumit club Maccabi Haifa F.C. Bastuni later served as an advisor on issues pertaining to Arab settlements in the Ministry of Housing. He was also dedicated to furthering Jewish-Arab harmony and in 1966 he founded the Actions Committee of Israeli Arabs for Israel. In 1969 he emigrated to the United States where he became an advocate for the one-state solution, publishing his views in the New York Times in 1972. He later taught Middle Eastern history at the State University of New York and became the chief architect of the New York City College of Technology.

He died in 1994 at the age of 71.
