= Ramiz Jaraisy =

Arab-Israeli politician, engineer and former mayor of Nazareth

- رامز جرايسي
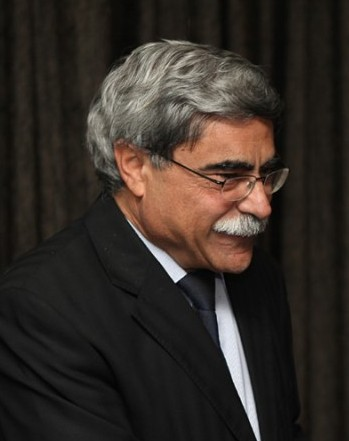
- Ramiz Jaraisy

Mayor of Nazareth
- In office 4 August 1994 – 11 March 2014
- Preceded by: Tawfiq Ziad
- Succeeded by: Ali Salam

Personal details
- Born: 24 October 1951 (age 74) Nazareth, Israel
- Party: Hadash
- Spouse: Hanan Karkabi
- Children: 3
- Education: Technion – Israel Institute of Technology (BSc, MSc)
- Occupation: Politician, mechanical engineer, civil engineer

Ramiz Jaraisy (Arabic: رامز جرايسي, Hebrew: ראמז ג'ראיסי; born 24 October 1951) is an Arab-Israeli politician, mechanical engineer, civil engineer and the former mayor of Nazareth.

Jaraisy was born to a Palestinian Christian family in Nazareth, Israel. He holds a BSc in mechanical engineering (1973) and an MSc in civil engineering (1978), both from the Technion – Israel Institute of Technology. He established two Arab-Israeli student unions, first for the Technion, and subsequently a national chapter. Jaraisy is a Greek Orthodox Christian.

Jaraisy was first elected to the Nazareth City Council in 1978. Later he became deputy mayor under Tawfiq Ziad. After Ziad's death in 1994 he was elected mayor of Nazareth. He was beaten and succeeded by deputy mayor Ali Salam in 2014.

Political offices
Preceded by Tawfiq Ziad	Mayor of Nazareth; 1994–2014	Succeeded by Ali Salam
