= Salah-Hassan Hanifes =

Druze Israeli politician (1913-2002)

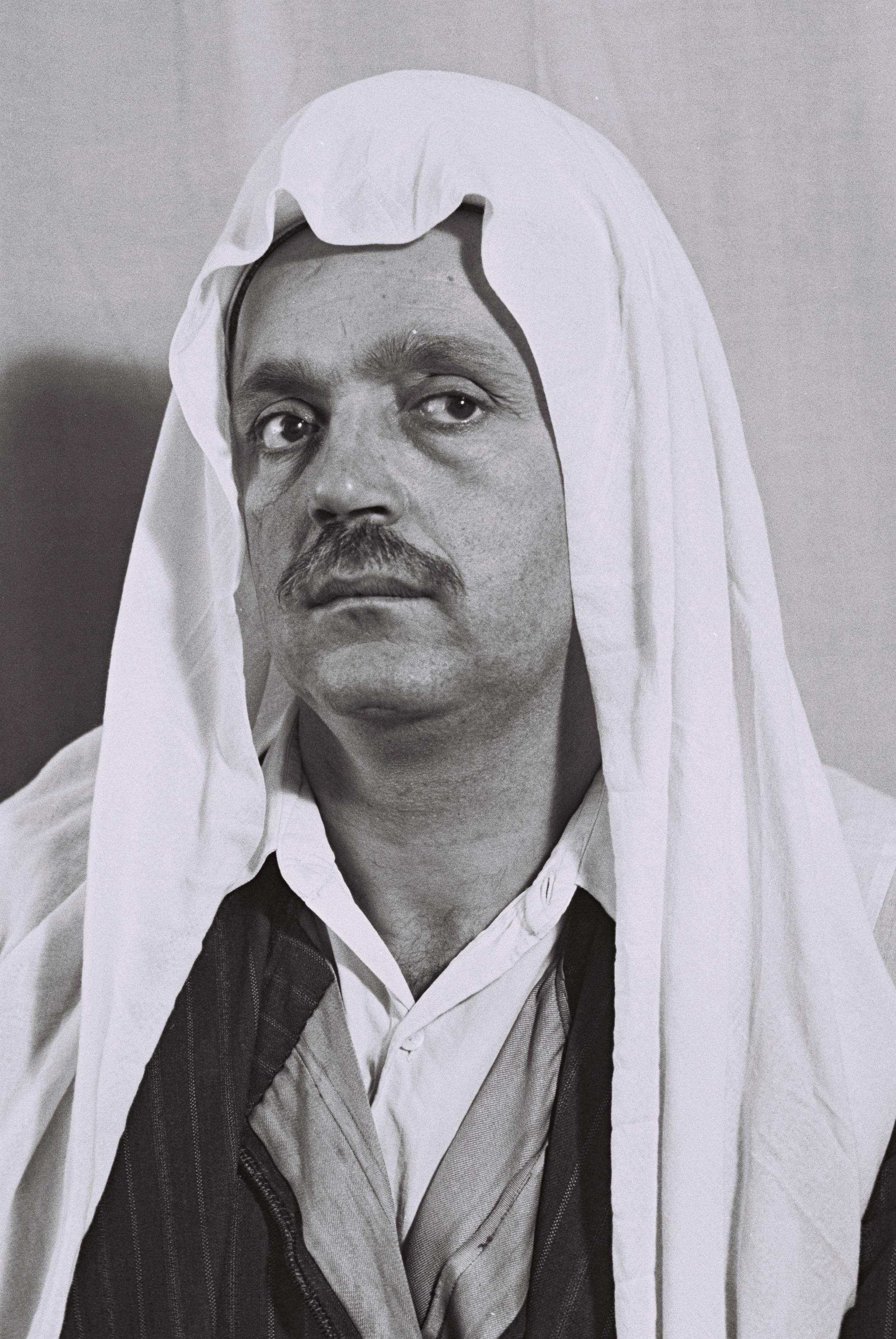
- Hanifes in 1952

Faction represented in the Knesset
- 1951–1959: Progress and Work

Personal details
- Born: 1 March 1913 Shefa-'Amr, Ottoman Empire
- Died: 16 March 2002 (aged 89)

Salah-Hassan Hanifes (Arabic: صالح حسن خنيفس, Hebrew: סאלח-חסן ח'ניפס; 1 March 1913 – 16 March 2002) was a Druze Israeli politician who served as a member of the Knesset for Progress and Work between 1951 and 1959.

== Biography ==
Born in Shefa-'Amr in 1913 during the Ottoman era, Hanifes studied at a primary school in his village, before attending a Druze religious centre in Lebanon. During the 1930s he made contacts with the Haganah, and helped enlist Druze during the 1948 Arab-Israeli War. In 1949 he was appointed to the Supreme Druze Council established by the government. Two years later he was elected to the Knesset as leader of the Progress and Work list, which was allied to Mapai, the ruling party. He was re-elected in 1955.

In 1959 a dispute with Mapai led to Hanifes setting up a new party, the Independent Faction for Israeli Arabs, to run in the elections that year. However, the party received only 0.4% of the vote, failing to cross the 1% electoral threshold, resulting in Hanifes losing his seat.

He died in 2002 at the age of 89.
