= Abd el-Aziz el-Zoubi =

Arab-Israeli politician (1926–1974)

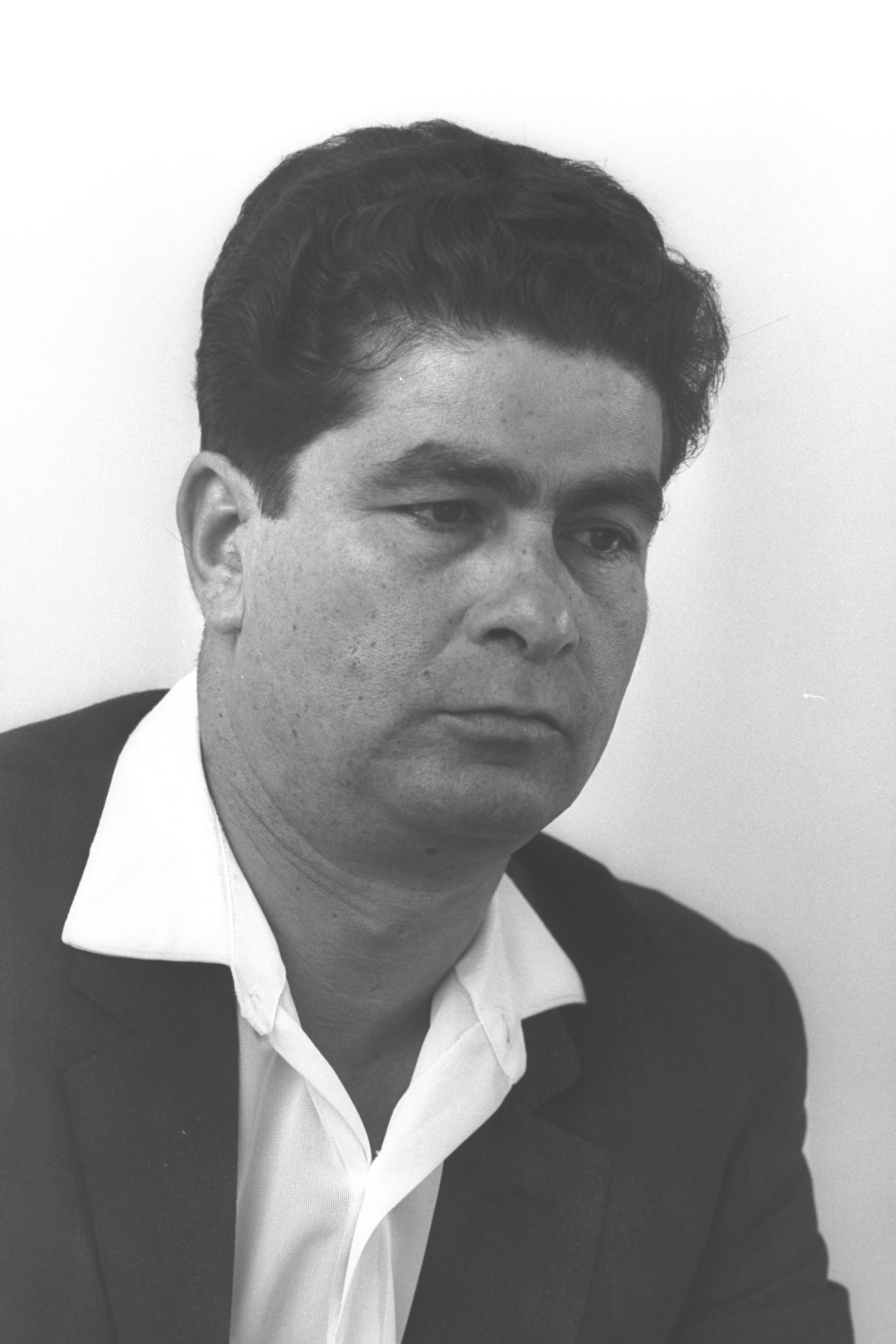
- El-Zoubi in 1965

Faction represented in the Knesset
- 1965–1969: Mapam
- 1969–1974: Alignment

Personal details
- Born: 4 February 1926 Nazareth, Mandatory Palestine
- Died: 14 February 1974 (aged 48) Israel

Abd el-Aziz el-Zoubi (Arabic: عبد العزيز الزعبي, Hebrew: עבד אל-עזיז א-זועבי; 4 February 1926 – 14 February 1974) was an Israeli Arab politician who served as a member of the Knesset for Mapam and the Alignment from 1965 until his death in 1974. When appointed Deputy Minister of Health on 24 May 1971, he became the first non-Jewish member of an Israeli government.

== Biography ==
Born in Nazareth during the Mandate era, el-Zoubi was educated at a local high school, before attending the Arab College in Jerusalem. He worked as a tax clerk for the Mandate authorities, and following Israeli independence in 1948, worked as a clerk for the Israel Lands Authority until 1958. He also served as secretary of the Government Workers Union in Nazareth. In 1956 he helped organise the Jewish Arab Association for Peace and Equal Rights, and was amongst the founders of the Arab Institute at Givat Haviva. In 1958 he joined Mapam, and in 1961 was appointed deputy mayor of Nazareth. In 1965 he became the city's mayor, holding the post until the following year. In the November 1965 Knesset elections he won a seat on the Mapam list, and entered the parliament.

He was re-elected in 1969 on the Alignment list (an alliance of the Labor Party and Mapam), and on 24 May 1971 was appointed Deputy Minister of Health in Golda Meir's government. He retained his seat in the 1973 elections, but died less than a month after the Knesset reconvened. His seat was taken by Haviv Shimoni.

El-Zoubi was also a member of the editorial board of New Outlook as well as an editor for al Fajar, an Arabic monthly and al Mersad, an Arabic weekly.

His extended family, the Zoubi, includes Seif el-Din el-Zoubi, who also served as a member of the Knesset for several parties and mayor of Nazareth, and cousin Haneen Zoubi, who was a Knesset member for Balad.

Political offices
| Preceded by Seif el-Din el-Zoubi | Mayor of Nazareth; 1965–1966 | Succeeded by Committee (1966); Musa Ketelli (1967) |
