= Tawfik Zayyad =

Palestinian poet and politician (1929–1994)

Tawfiq Zayyad
- توفيق زيّاد
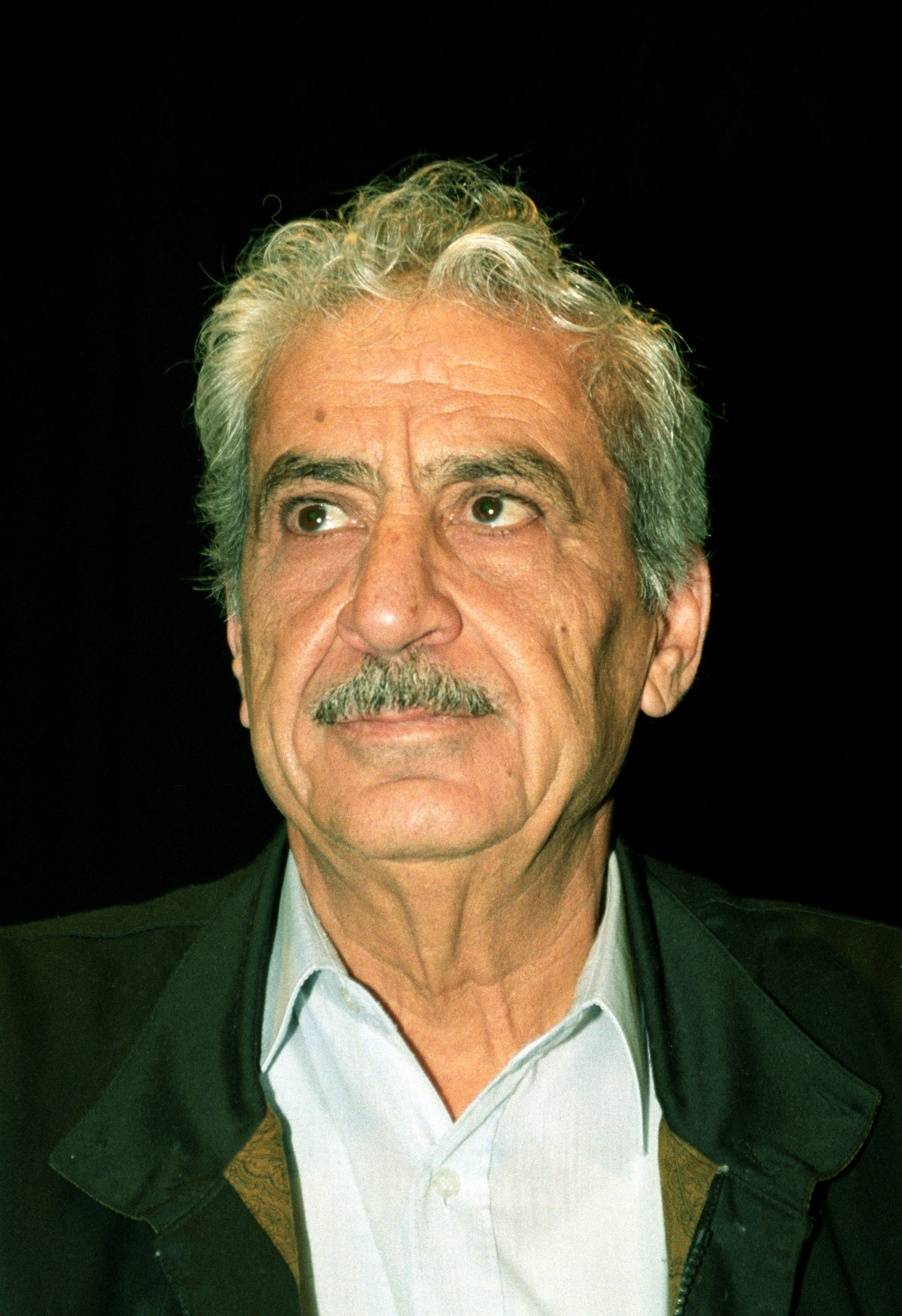
- Ziad in 1993

Mayor of Nazareth
- In office 9 December 1975 – 5 July 1994
- Preceded by: Temporary committee
- Succeeded by: Ramiz Jaraisy

Faction represented in the Knesset
- 1973–1977: Rakah
- 1977–1990: Hadash
- 1992–1994: Hadash

Personal details
- Born: 7 May 1929 Nazareth, Mandatory Palestine
- Died: 5 July 1994 (aged 65) Jordan Valley, West Bank, Palestine
- Party: Communist Party of Israel, Hadash
- Spouse: Naila Youssef Sabbagh
- Children: 4
- Education: Higher Party School
- Occupation: Poet, politician

Tawfiq Zayyad (Arabic: توفيق زيّاد, romanized: Tawfīq Ziyyād; Hebrew: תאופיק זיאד, romanized: Ta'ufík Ziyád; 7 May 1929 – 5 July 1994), also romanized Tawfik Ziad or Tawfeeq Ziad, was a Palestinian politician, poet, and activist who served in Israel's Knesset. He is best known for his advocacy on behalf of Palestinian citizens of Israel.

== Biography ==
Born in Nazareth during the British Mandate, Ziad was active in the Israeli communist party. His nom de guerre was Abū l-Amīn (Arabic: أبو الأمين). As an activist, he helped to organize a protest on taxation, a student strike and an agricultural workers’ strike in the Galilee. He was arrested in April 1954 and confined to Nazareth for half a year. Over the years he was arrested and imprisoned several times. In 1962–1964, he moved to Moscow to study at Higher Party School.

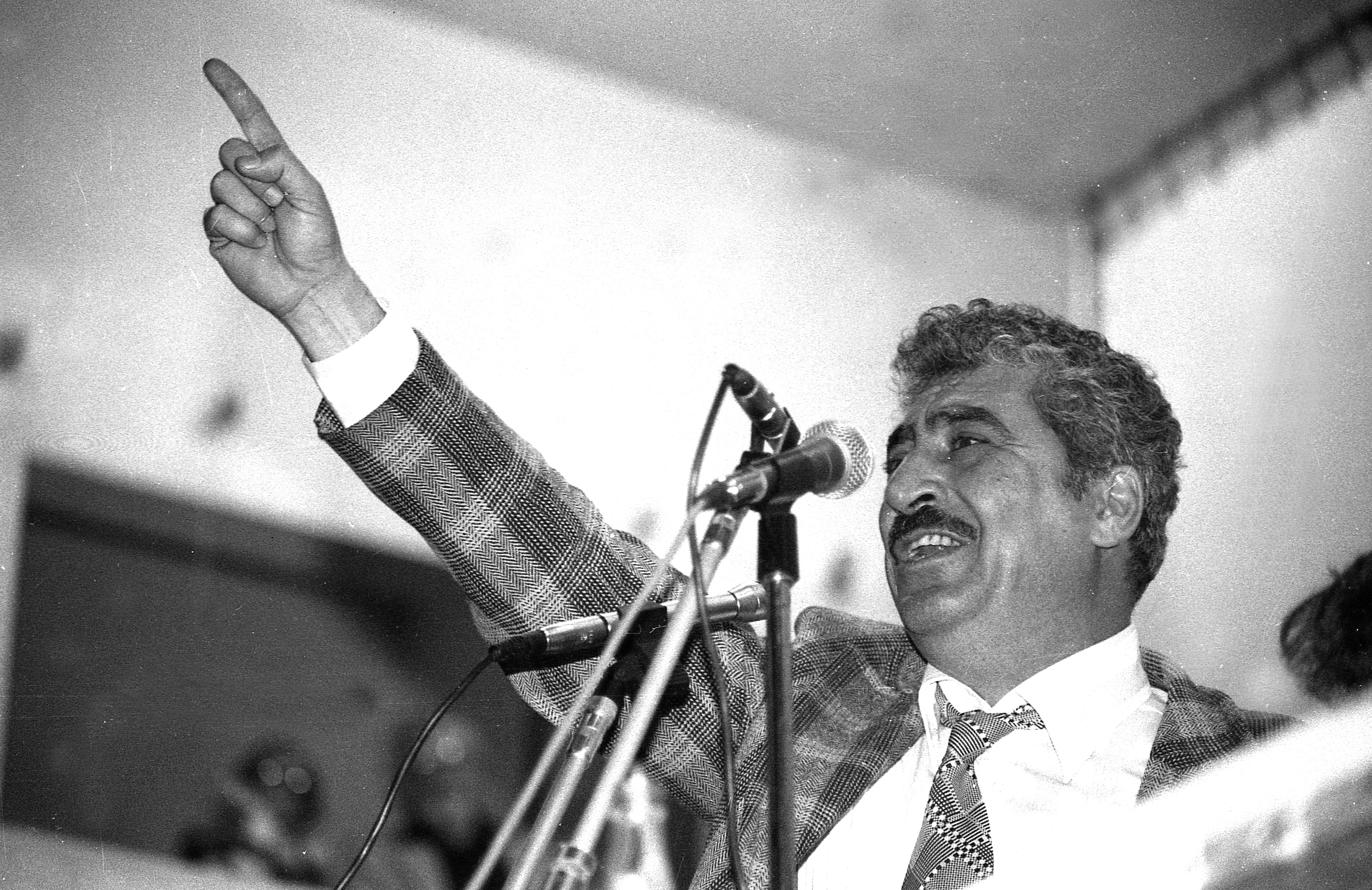
Ziad addresses a Communist Party meeting in Nazareth, February 17, 1979

In December 1975, Ziad was elected mayor of Nazareth, serving as leader of the Communist party of Israel in the Democratic Front for Peace and Equality coalition. It was an appointment that was hailed a significant event in Israeli Palestinian political history. Ziad would serve as mayor for 19 years, until his 1994 death in office.

Elected to the Knesset in the 1973 elections on Rakah's list, Ziad was active in pressuring the Israeli government to change its policies towards Arabs. A report he co-authored on Israeli prison conditions which said torture of prisoners in Israeli prisons was reprinted in the Israeli newspaper Al HaMishmar. It was also submitted to the United Nations by Tawfik Toubi, and Ziad after their visit to Al-Far'ah prison on 29 October 1987. It was subsequently quoted from at length in a UN General Assembly report dated 23 December 1987, where it was described as "Perhaps the best evidence of the truth of the reports describing the repugnant inhumane conditions endured by Arab prisoners."

== Political views and positions ==
Ziad consistently identified as a communist and remained committed to Marxist political principles throughout his public life. As a leading figure in Maki and later Hadash, he advanced a political program grounded in class struggle, socialist internationalism, and opposition to ethnic nationalism, while advocating full civil and national rights for Palestinian citizens of Israel. Contemporary observers and later commentators have described his ideological stance as unusually consistent within Israeli parliamentary politics, noting that he did not substantially moderate his communist positions despite long-term participation in electoral and municipal institutions.

Central to Ziad’s political outlook was the principle of Jewish–Arab partnership based on shared material and class interests rather than ethnic or religious identity. In a retrospective analysis published in the Hebrew-language outlet Local Call, historian Tamir Sorek describes Ziad as a leading proponent of a universalist communist framework that linked Palestinian national rights with democratic struggle inside Israel, rejecting both Zionist exclusivism and separatist nationalism in favor of sustained joint political action. Similar assessments appear in English-language retrospective commentary, which emphasizes Ziad’s long-standing commitment to Jewish–Arab political partnership as a central feature of his ideological approach.

Ziad’s commitment to the Palestinian cause was frequently described by commentators and scholars in terms of sumud (steadfastness), a concept emphasizing long-term presence, political organization, and resistance through civic and institutional means rather than armed struggle. This form of steadfastness was particularly evident during the events surrounding Land Day in 1976. Ziad, then Mayor of Nazareth, publicly opposed attempts by government-aligned officials to cancel the general strike protesting land expropriations in the Galilee. Contemporary reporting and historical overviews describe Land Day as a major turning point in the collective political mobilization of Palestinian citizens of Israel and the first nationwide general strike of the Arab population within the state.

According to an essay by Meir Vilner, then General Secretary of Maki, published in the party’s Hebrew-language journal Arakhim in 1996, Ziad played a decisive leadership role in resisting pressure on Arab local authorities to abandon the strike and argued that it reflected the genuine mood of the Arab public rather than the positions of government-appointed intermediaries. Independent journalistic retrospectives likewise emphasize Ziad’s prominence during Land Day as central to consolidating his reputation as a leading symbol of Palestinian political steadfastness pursued through Israeli institutional politics.

During his tenure as a member of the Knesset, Ziad was an outspoken critic of Israeli government policies toward Arab citizens, particularly land expropriation, unequal municipal funding, and planning restrictions, as well as Israel’s policies in the Israeli-occupied territories. His positions aligned closely with those of Hadash and the Israeli Communist Party, including opposition to occupation and support for a negotiated political resolution based on equality and national self-determination. These positions are documented both in retrospective political analysis and in contemporary reporting from the period of his parliamentary activity.

Ziad also played a role in documenting alleged abuses against Palestinian detainees. In the late 1980s, he co-authored reports on prison conditions following official visits, documentation later cited by the United Nations General Assembly as evidence of systematic abuse of Palestinian detainees. Commentators have identified this activity as part of his broader effort to advance the Palestinian cause through legal, parliamentary, and international mechanisms rather than underground or militant action.

== Poetry ==
The theme of sumud, which became a major literary theme as a form of "resistance", played an important role in Ziad's poetry. He is particularly well known for his poem Here We Will Stay:

In Lydda, in Ramla, in the Galilee,
we shall remain
like a wall upon your chest, and in your throat
like a shard of glass
a cactus thorn,
and in your eyes
a sandstorm,

We shall remain
a wall upon your chest,
clean in your restaurants,
serve drinks in your bars,
sweep the floors of your kitchens
to snatch a bite for our children
from your blue fangs.

== Death ==
Ziad died on 5 July 1994 in a head-on collision in the Jordan Valley on his way back to Nazareth from Jericho after welcoming Yasser Arafat, the chairman of the Palestine Liberation Organization, back from exile. He was survived by his wife and four children. At the time of his sudden death, he was still Mayor of Nazareth, a member of the Knesset and "a leading Arab legislator". Streets are named after him in Shefa-'Amr, Nazareth, and Sakhnin.

== Footnotes ==
Political offices
Preceded by Committee (1975); Seif el-Din el-Zoubi (1974)	Mayor of Nazareth; 1975–1994	Succeeded by Ramiz Jaraisy
