= Seif el-Din el-Zoubi =

Israeli politician (1913–1986)

Saif al-Din al-Zoubi
- سيف الدين الزعبي
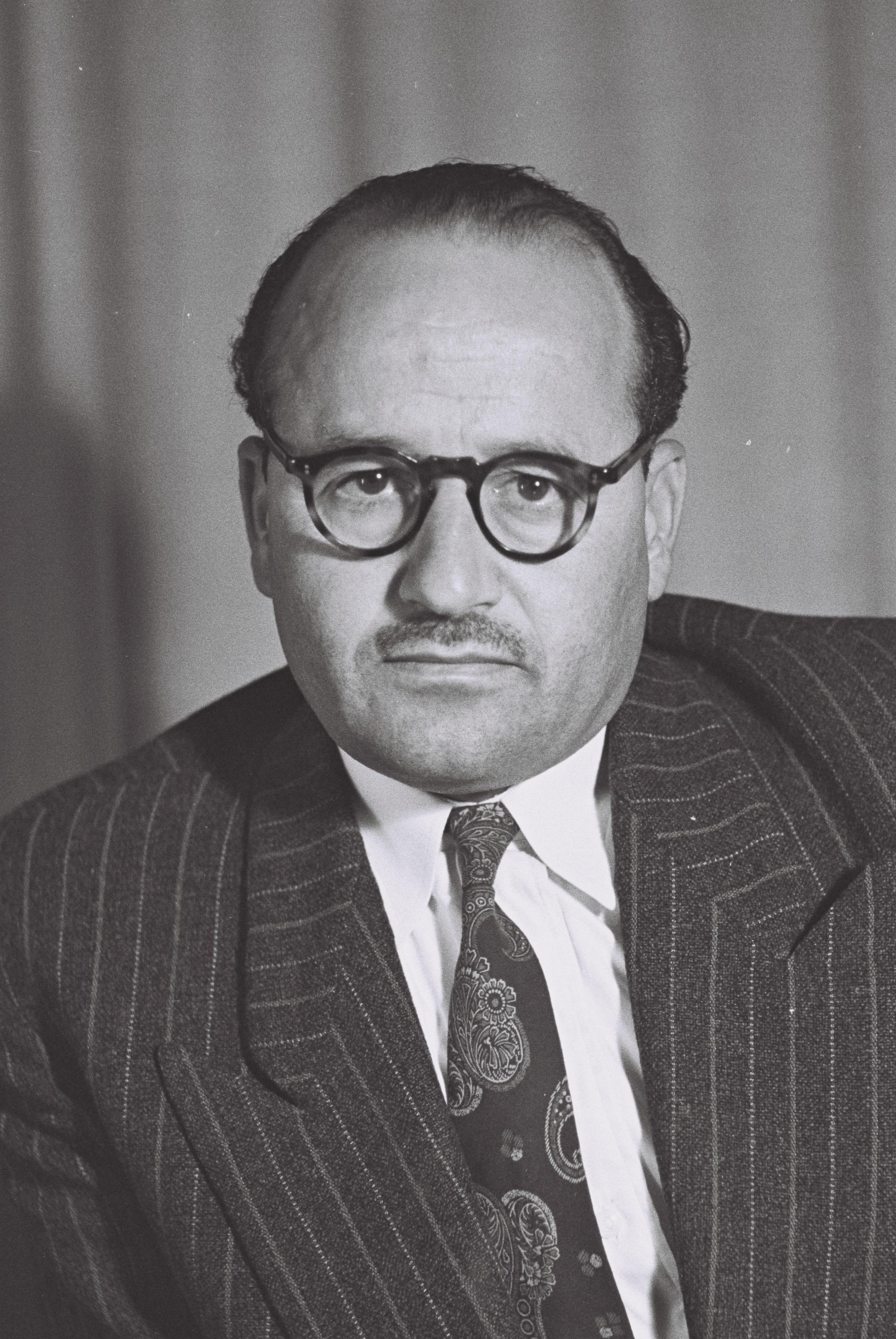

Mayor of Nazareth
- In office 5 May 1971 – 13 May 1974
- Preceded by: Musa Ketelli
- Succeeded by: Temporary committee
- In office 28 December 1959 – 20 December 1965
- Preceded by: Amin-Salim Jarjora
- Succeeded by: Abd el-Aziz el-Zoubi

Faction represented in the Knesset
- 1949–1951: Democratic List of Nazareth
- 1951–1959: Democratic List for Israeli Arabs
- 1965–1966: Progress and Development
- 1966–1967: Cooperation and Development
- 1967–1974: Progress and Development
- 1974–1976: Alignment
- 1976–1977: Progress and Development
- 1977–1979: United Arab List

Personal details
- Born: 1913 Nazareth, Ottoman Empire
- Died: 26 June 1986 (aged 72–73) Israel

Seif el-Din el-Zoubi (Note: Arabic: سيف الدين الزعبي, Hebrew: סַיִף אֵל־דִּין אֶל־זעֻבִּי; in Hebrew his name was most often written without niqqud (as is standard) as סיף א־דין א־זועבי.) (Arabic: سيف الدين الزعبي; 1913 – 26 June 1986) was an Israeli Arab politician.

== Biography ==
El-Zoubi was born in 1913 in Nazareth, where he attended high school. During the British Mandate of Palestine, he was active in the Haganah and later received the Fighter of the State Decoration. During the 1948 Palestine war, he convinced the Zoubi family to throw their weight behind the Jewish side and not for Fawzi al-Qawuqji's Arab Liberation Army.

In 1949, he was elected to the Knesset as the leader of the Democratic List of Nazareth which was a bloc party of Mapai. During this time he was a member of the Knesset Internal Affairs Committee. He was re-elected in 1951 on the Democratic List for Israeli Arabs, and again in 1955. During this time he served on the Knesset house committee. He resigned from the Knesset on 13 February 1956. In 1959, he became mayor of Nazareth and held the post until 1965, when he returned to the Knesset on the Progress and Development list, which briefly merged into Cooperation and Development before regaining its independence. He was elected to the Knesset in 1969, and was appointed Deputy Speaker of the Knesset. In 1971, el-Zoubi became mayor of Nazareth again, holding the post until 1974.

El-Zoubi was re-elected in 1973. In 1974, Progress and Development merged into Alignment, before leaving it and forming the United Arab List. He was re-elected for a final time on the United Arab List slate in 1977, before resigning his seat on 3 April 1979. He died in 1986.

Haneen Zoabi, who served as a Member of the Knesset for the Joint List, is a relative.

=== Controversy ===
According to Israeli historian Ori Stendel, el-Zoubi used his ties with the Israeli establishment to compensate for the decline of his political power within the Zubia clan. Historian Hillel Cohen wrote that el-Zoubi was "upgraded" by Mapai in exchange for relinquishing national demands and legitimizing land confiscations. Yitzhak Laor described his conduct as tantamount to taking political bribery.

== Publications ==
- Autobiography: ”Eyewitness” (Arabic: شاهد عيان, 1987)

== See also ==
- Zoubi family

== Notes ==
Political offices
Preceded by Amin-Salim Jarjora	Mayor of Nazareth; 1959–1965	Succeeded by Abd el-Aziz el-Zoubi
Preceded by Musa Ketelli	Mayor of Nazareth; 1971–1974	Succeeded by Committee (1974); Tawfiq Ziad (1975)
