= 1951 Israeli legislative election =

- 30 July 1951
- Turnout: 75.15%
Party	Leader	Vote %	Seats	+/–
Mapai	David Ben-Gurion	37.30	45	−1
General Zionists	Israel Rokach	16.20	20	+13
Mapam	Meir Ya'ari	12.52	15	−4
Hapoel HaMizrachi	Haim-Moshe Shapira	6.74	8	+1
Herut	Menachem Begin	6.64	8	−6
Maki	Shmuel Mikunis	3.98	5	+1
Progressive Party	Pinchas Rosen	3.22	4	−1
Democratic List for Israeli Arabs	Seif el-Din el-Zoubi	2.38	3	New
Agudat Yisrael	Yitzhak-Meir Levin	2.01	3	+1
Sephardim and Oriental Communities	Eliyahu Eliashar	1.75	2	−2
PAI	Binyamin Mintz	1.63	2	−1
Mizrachi	David-Zvi Pinkas	1.51	2	−2
Progress and Work	Salah-Hassan Hanifes	1.17	1	New
Yemenite Association	Shimon Garidi	1.16	1	0
Agriculture and Development	Faras Hamdan	1.14	1	New
This lists parties that won seats. See the complete results below.
Prime Minister before	Prime Minister after
David Ben-Gurion; Mapai	David Ben-Gurion; Mapai

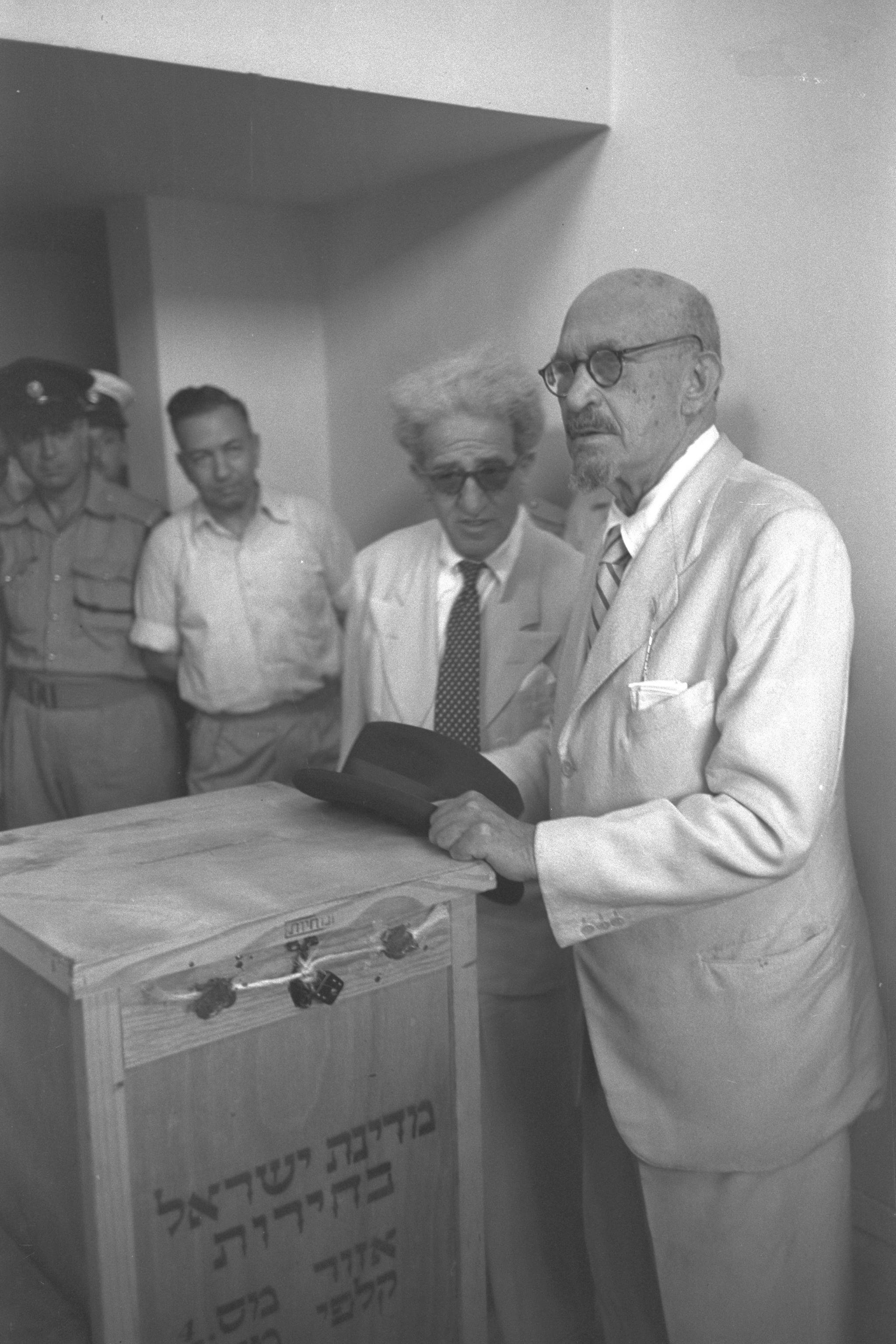
President Chaim Weizmann votes

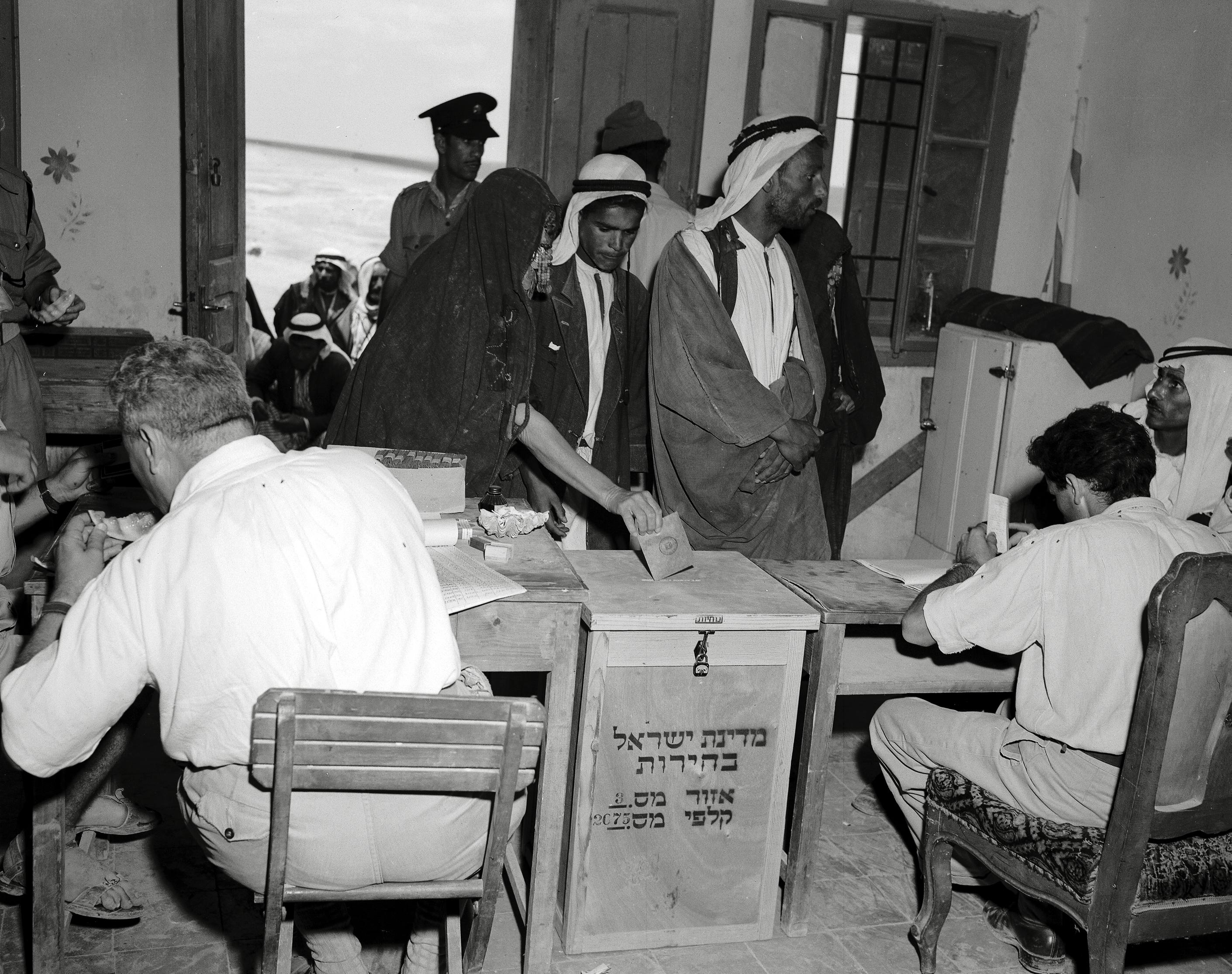
Bedouin man votes

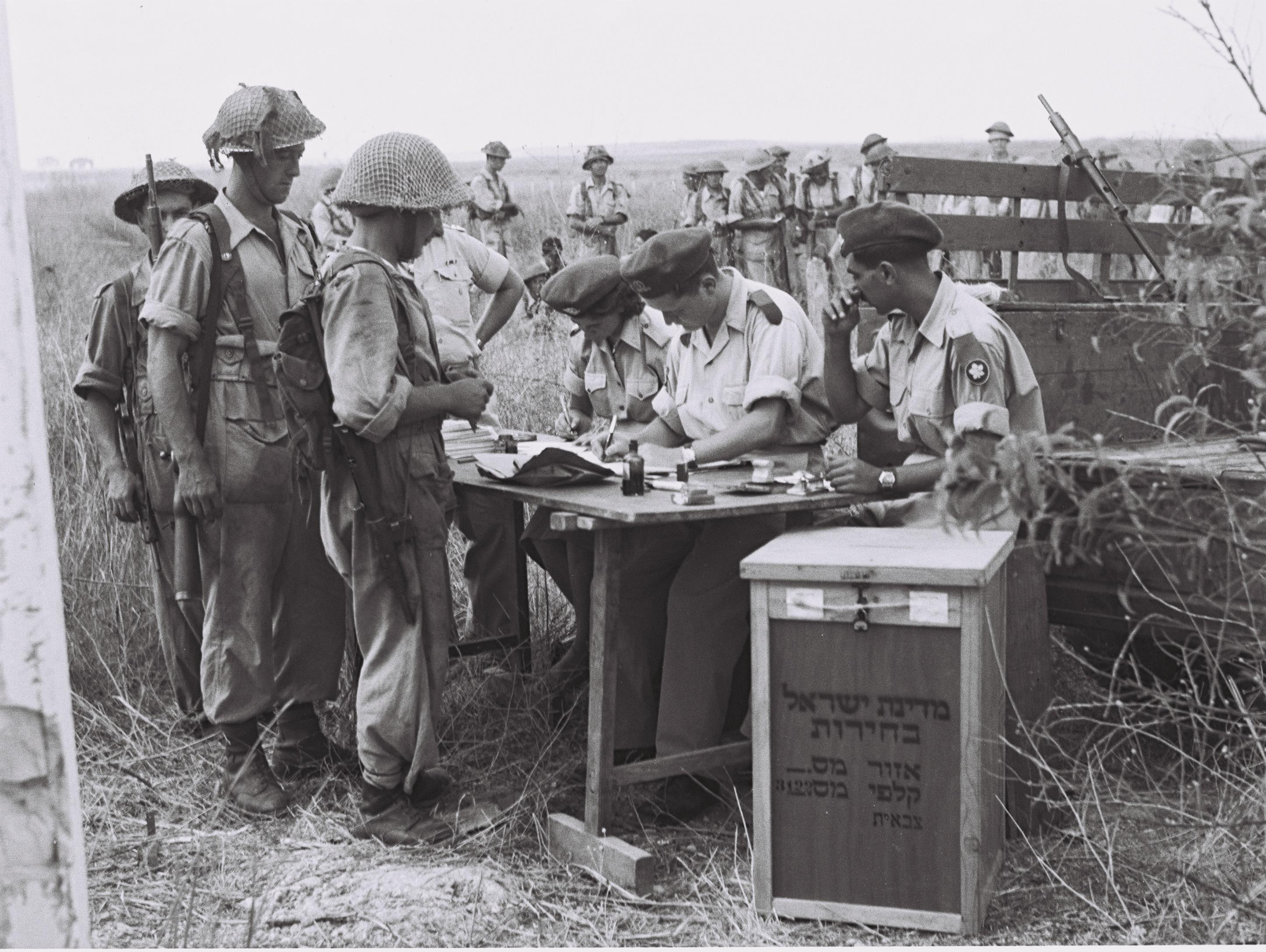
Soldiers vote at a field polling station

Elections for the second Knesset were held in Israel on 30 July 1951. Voter turnout was 75%.

== Results ==
Party	Votes	%	Seats	+/–
Mapai	256,456	37.30	45	−1
General Zionists	111,394	16.20	20	+13
Mapam	86,095	12.52	15	−4
Hapoel HaMizrachi	46,347	6.74	8	+1
Herut	45,651	6.64	8	−6
Maki	27,334	3.98	5	+1
Progressive Party	22,171	3.22	4	−1
Democratic List for Israeli Arabs	16,370	2.38	3	New
Agudat Yisrael	13,799	2.01	3	+1
Sephardim and Oriental Communities	12,002	1.75	2	−2
Poalei Agudat Yisrael	11,194	1.63	2	−1
Mizrachi	10,383	1.51	2	−2
Progress and Work	8,067	1.17	1	New
Yemenite Association	7,965	1.16	1	0
Agriculture and Development	7,851	1.14	1	New
Sepharadim-Ashkenazim Unity	4,038	0.59	0	New
For New Immigrants and Freed Soldiers	375	0.05	0	New
Total	687,492	100.00	120	0
Valid votes	687,492	98.92		
Invalid/blank votes	7,515	1.08		
Total votes	695,007	100.00		
Registered voters/turnout	924,885	75.15		
Source: IDI, Nohlen et al.

== Aftermath ==
The second Knesset was highly unstable, with four separate governments, two different Prime Ministers and several defections; Rostam Bastuni, Avraham Berman and Moshe Sneh left Mapam and set up the Left Faction. Bastuni later returned to Mapam whilst Berman and Sneh joined Maki. Hannah Lamdan and David Livschitz also left Mapam, establishing the Faction independent of Ahdut HaAvoda before joining Mapai. Four other members left Mapam to found Ahdut HaAvoda – Poale Zion, but the move was not recognised by the Knesset speaker. During the Knesset term, Sephardim and Oriental Communities joined the General Zionists.

As with the first Knesset, the speaker was Yosef Sprinzak.

=== Third government ===
The second Knesset started with David Ben-Gurion forming the third government of Israel (the first Knesset had two governments) on 8 October 1951. His Mapai party formed a coalition with Mizrachi, Hapoel HaMizrachi, Agudat Yisrael, Agudat Yisrael Workers and the three Israeli Arab parties, the Democratic List for Israeli Arabs, Progress and Work and Agriculture and Development. Like the first Knesset, there were 15 ministers. The government resigned on 19 December 1952 due to a dispute with the religious parties over religious education.

=== Fourth government ===
Ben-Gurion formed the fourth government on 24 December 1952, dropping the ultra-orthodox parties (Agudat Yisrael and Agudat Yisrael Workers) and replacing them with the General Zionists and the Progressive Party. The new government had 16 ministers. Ben-Gurion resigned on 6 December 1953 as he wished to settle in the Negev kibbutz of Sde Boker.

=== Fifth government ===
Moshe Sharett formed the fifth government on 26 January 1954 with the same coalition partners and ministers. Sharett resigned on 29 June 1955, when the General Zionists refused to abstain from voting on a motion of no-confidence brought by Herut and Maki over the government's position on the trial of Malchiel Gruenwald, who had accused Rudolf Kastner of collaborating with the Nazis.

=== Sixth government ===
Sharett formed the sixth government on 29 June 1955, eliminating the General Zionists and the Progressive Party from the coalition and reducing the number of ministers to 12. The new government did not last long, as a general election was called for 26 July 1955.

== See also ==
- List of members of the second Knesset
