= Left Faction =

Left Socialist Party סיעת שמאל
- Leader: Moshe Sneh; Adolf Berman
- Founded: 2 February 1953
- Dissolved: 1 November 1954
- Split from: Mapam
- Merged into: Maki
- Ideology: Socialism; Communism; Marxism; Non-Zionism
- Political position: Left-wing to far-left
- Most MKs: 3 (1953)
- Fewest MKs: 2 (1953-1954)

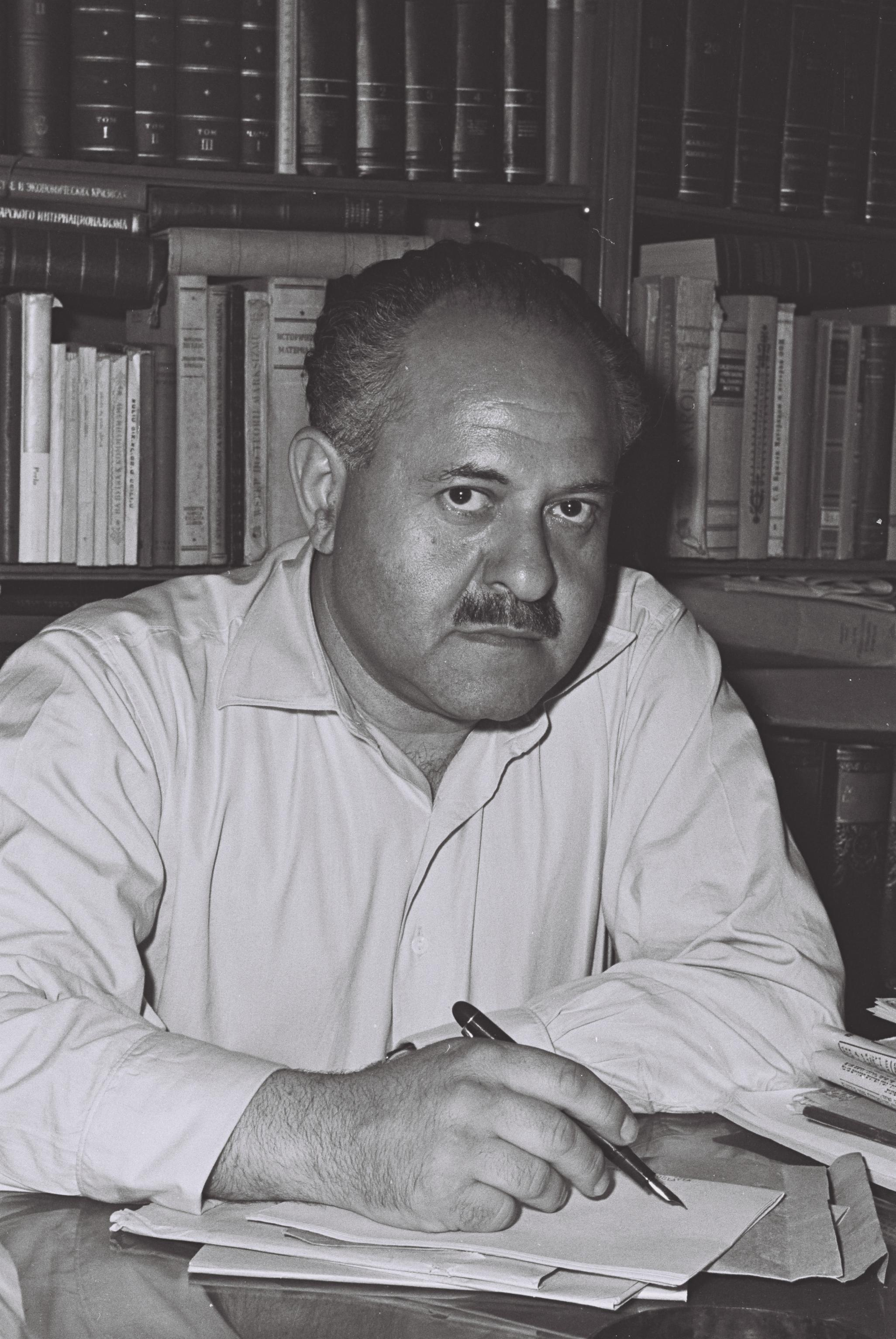
Dr. Moshe Sneh

The Left Faction (Hebrew: סיעת שמאל, Siat Smol), also known as the Left Socialist Party, was a short-lived political party in Israel.

== History ==
Mapam, the second-largest political party in Israel, was shaken by the Prague Trials, a series of show trials in which mostly Jewish leaders of the Communist Party of Czechoslovakia were purged, and that falsely implicated Mapam's envoy in Prague, Mordechai Oren, as part of a Zionist conspiracy. This, and later Nikita Khrushchev's Secret Speech at the 20th Party Congress in the Soviet Union, led to Mapam moving away from some of their more radical left-wing positions, and towards democratic socialism. Within the party, a stratification of three factions occurred: the moderates who joined from the Ahdut HaAvoda Poale Zion Movement, on the far left, Rostam Bastuni (the first Israeli Arab MK representing a Zionist party), Ya'akov Riftin, Adolf Berman and Moshe Sneh, and in the middle, the Hashomer Hatzair faction. The far-left faction broadly believed that stronger ties to the Soviet Union were more important than continuing the Zionist project.

On 26 December 1952, Mapam's Council convened to vote on motions where the far-left found themselves in the minority. Berman and Sneh were dismissed from their positions in the party committee, which they unsuccessfully appealed the decision, after which they accused Mapam of being controlled by 'Mapai agents for the benefit and enjoyment of the bourgeoisie'. A few days after, the far-left was purged from all positions of power within the party, and on 28 January 1953, Mapam voted to expel Berman and Sneh for their 'fundamental opposition to the socialist Zionist principles' of the party, for trying to 'undermine the party's institutions' and for supporting the ruling of the Prague Trials.

The Left Faction was formed on 2 February 1953 (during the second Knesset) as a breakaway from Mapam, by Sneh, Berman and Bastuni. Riftin was persuaded not to join. Mapam's allied kibbutz movement, Kibbutz Artzi, carried out a purge on sympathisers of the Left Faction.

The party soon renamed itself to the Left Socialist Party. Sneh proclaimed that it "will further prove that it will play a pioneering role in the national and social liberation of the Jewish people and in the role of saving the State of Israel, its independence, security and future".

In March 1953, the Left Faction voted against a law that allowed the state to expropriate the land of absent Arabs who had been expelled in the Nakba. Maki also voted against the law, while Mapam abstained. On 24 March, Rostam Bastuni returned to Mapam.

In November 1953, although Sneh had ruled out joining the communist party, Maki, it was revealed that he had tried to admit the Left Faction to Maki, only to be declined because Maki did not accept internal factions.

On 23 August 1954, the Ahdut HaAvoda-Poale Zion faction seceded from Mapam. Realising the opportunity to politically overtake the weakened Mapam, the Left Faction began negotiations to merge into Maki, which succeeded when Sneh was given 4th place on Maki's list of the 1955 elections.

In October, the party's committee approved a merger with Maki, and the Left Faction formally dissolved on 1 November 1954. Sneh stated that he and his party had fully rejected Zionism for communism, calling it the ideology that would liberate the Israeli working class.
