= Saleh Suleiman =

Arab-Israeli politician (1888-1980)

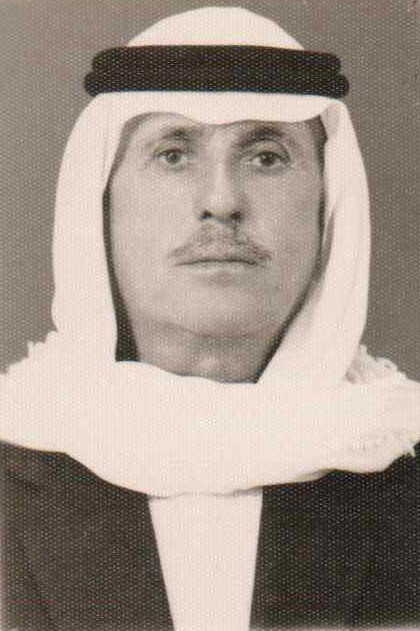
- Suleiman in the 1950s

Faction represented in the Knesset
- 1955–1959: Progress and Work

Personal details
- Born: 1888 Reineh, Ottoman Empire
- Died: 24 November 1980 (aged 91–92)

Saleh Suleiman (Arabic: صالح سليمان, Hebrew: צאלח סלימאן; 1888 – 24 November 1980) was an Israeli Arab politician who served as a member of the Knesset for Progress and Work between 1955 and 1959.

== Biography ==
Suleiman was born in Reineh during the Ottoman era. He was elected to the Knesset in 1955 on the Progress and Work list and was a member of the Internal Affairs Committee

Suleiman joined Progress and Development prior to the 1959 elections and was seventeenth on its list. However, the party won only two seats, resulting ion Suleiman leaving the Knesset. He was fourth on the Progress and Development list for the 1961 elections, but the party won only two seats. He was in seventy-fifth place on the party's list for the 1965 elections, again failing to win a seat.

He died on 24 November 1980.
