= United Jewish Workers Party "Poalej Syjon" in Poland =

Zionist socialist party in Poland from 1947 to 1949

The United Jewish Workers Party "Poalej Syjon" in Poland (Yiddish: פארייניקטער יידישער ארבעטער פארטיי פועלי-ציון אין פוילן, Polish: Zjednoczoną Żydowską Partię Robotniczą „Poalej Syjon”, abbreviated ZŻPR Poalej Syjon) was a Zionist socialist party in post-war Poland 1947-1949. The party was led by Adolf Berman.

The United Jewish Workers Party "Poalej Syjon" was formed through the merger of the two factions of the Poalej Syjon movement in Poland - the Jewish Workers Party "Poalej Syjon" Left and the Jewish Socialist Workers Party "Poalej Syjon" (C. S.). on October 19, 1947. However, a section of the latter party led by Józef Sack refused to go along with the merger and joined forces with the Hitachdut instead (forming the Jewish Zionist-Socialist Workers Party "Poalej Syjon C.S.-Hitachdut" in Poland).

On October 20, 1947 the Central Committee held its first meeting. It elected a Presidium consisting of Adolf Berman (chairman), Stefan Grajek (general secretary), Tuwia Borzykowski, Fiszel Hercberg, Eugenia Lewi, A. Lewit, Szymon Rosenberg, Józef Rotenberg, Henryk Szner and Dawid Sztokfisz. Other Central Committee members were Basia Temkin-Bermanowa, J. Bekler, L. Blas, I. Cendorf, J. Chludniewicz, M. Garfinkiel, I. Gurtman, A. Kagan, O. Lewin, J. Najmark, I. Sztajnberg and Hersz Wasser. The Central Committee had four candidate members - Leszcz, Ausland, Dr. Deutschmeister and Śmieciuchowski. On October 20, 1947 the President of the Republic, Bolesław Bierut, received a delegation from the United Jewish Workers Party "Poalej Syjon", consisting Bermana, Grajek, Hercberg, Lewi, Szner and Kagan. On behalf of the delegation, Berman briefed the President on the unification of the two Poalej Syjon parties and presented the of the united party. Berman and Grajek were also received by Prime Minister Józef Cyrankiewicz, and informed him on the unification of the two parties.

After the 1947 merger the United Jewish Workers Party "Poalej Syjon" emerged as the strongest party within the Zionist movement in Poland. The party had local committees in some 60 cities and towns across Poland. The program of the party, drafted by Adolf Berman envisioned the creation of a Jewish socialist state in Palestine through the assistance of the Soviet Union and with an understanding with the Arab community.

On June 25-26, 1949, the United Jewish Workers Party "Poalej Syjon" merged with the Haszomer Hacair, creating the Jewish Workers Party "Poalej Syjon - Haszomer Hacair" in Poland. This merger followed the pattern of the merger of its political counterparts into Mapam in Palestine.
