= Hassan Boustouni =

Israeli footballer

Hassan Boustouni (Arabic: حسن البستوني) was an Israeli footballer with Maccabi Haifa. Beginning his career in 1963, Boustouni was the first Arab footballer to play in Liga Leumit, the top Israeli division at the time. He was also the nephew of Rostam Bastuni, the first Arab citizen of Israel to represent a Zionist party in the Knesset.
