= Mahmud Al-Nashaf =

Israeli-Arab politician (1906-1979)

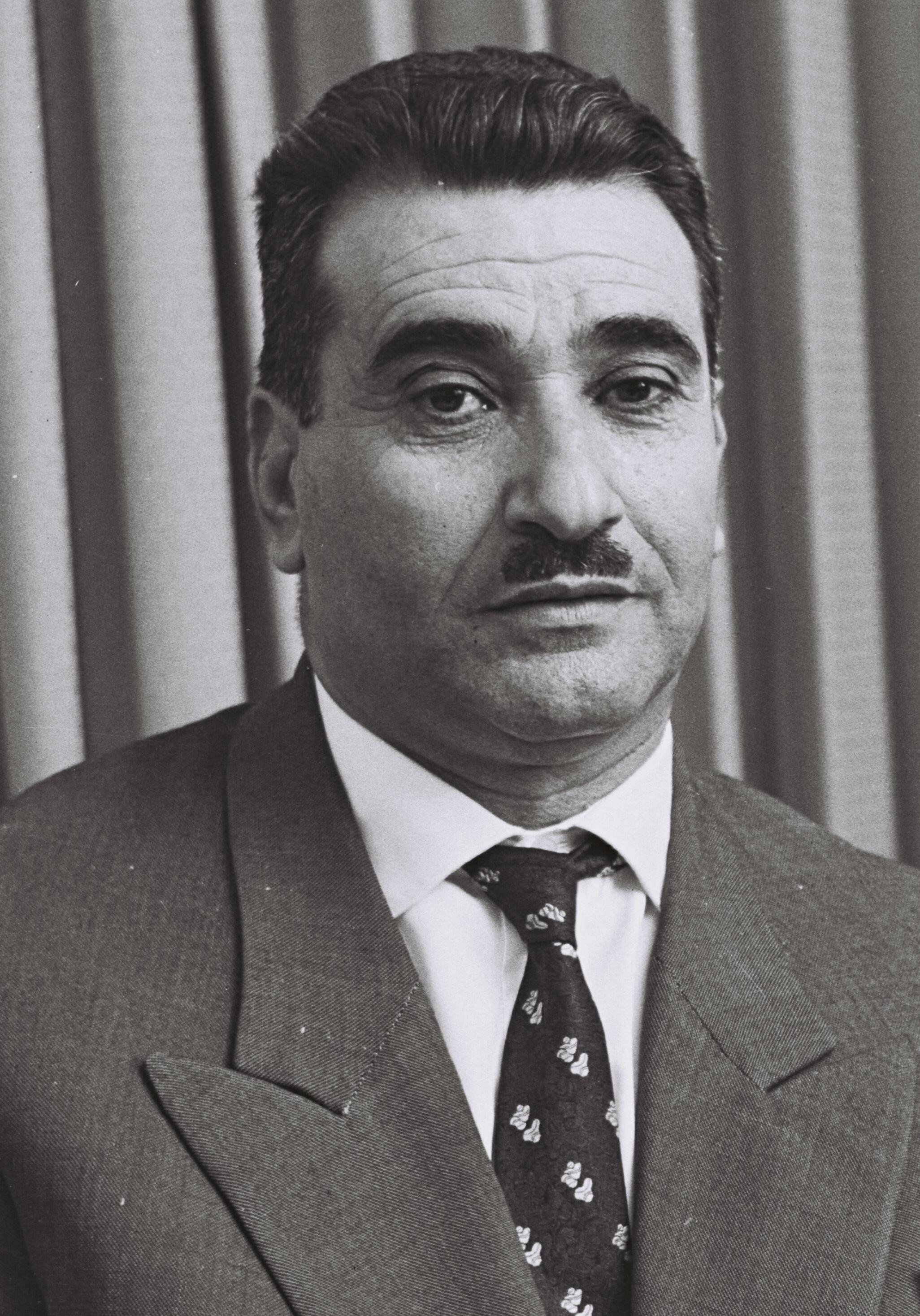
- Al-Nashaf in 1959

Faction represented in the Knesset
- 1959–1961: Agriculture and Development

Personal details
- Born: 1906 Tayibe, Ottoman Empire
- Died: 10 November 1979 (aged 72–73)

Mahmud Al-Nashaf (Arabic: محمود الناشف, Hebrew: מחמוד א-נאשף; 1906 – 10 November 1979) was an Israeli Arab politician who served as a member of the Knesset for Agriculture and Development between 1959 and 1961.

== Biography ==
Born in Tayibe during the Ottoman era, Al-Nashaf was elected to the town's council on an independent list, and later became the council's chairman. He was elected to the Knesset in 1959 as head of the Agriculture and Development list and served in the Knesset Committee on Education, Culture and Sports. He lost his seat in the early elections held two years later, in which the party did not compete.

He died in 1979.
