= Emil Sommerstein =

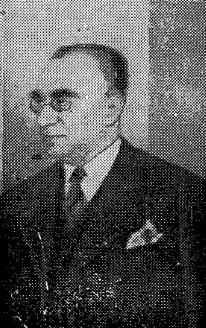
Emil Sommerstein

Emil Sommerstein (July 6, 1883 in the village of Hleszczawa near Trembowla – May 26, 1957 in Middletown, New York, United States) was a Polish-Jewish lawyer, philosopher, activist and politician.

== Biography ==
Sommerstein spent most of his life in Lwów, where, during the interwar period, he served as director of the Lawyers Office. From 1922 to 1939, with a break from 1927 to 1929, he was a deputy to the Polish Parliament, where he served on several commissions. He also published articles in Polish and Jewish newspapers and magazines, including Chwila, Glos Prawa, and Gazeta Bankowa.

Among other activities, Sommerstein founded the first organization of Jewish farmers, the Lesser Poland's Union of Farmers. In 1933, he co-created the United Antihitlerite Committee in Warsaw. Following the annexation of Lwów by the Soviet Union during the Soviet invasion of Poland, Sommerstein organized the Committee of Helping Jewish Refugees from Germany. He was arrested by the NKVD and sent to a Gulag prison camp, but was later released.

After the war, Sommerstein was released on the condition that he become Minister for Jewish Affairs in the communist-sponsored Polish Committee of National Liberation provisional government. He used this position to help Armia Krajowa partisans flee to the United Kingdom, disguising them as Orthodox Jews. In 1946, Sommerstein left Poland for the USA, where he died.

== Sources ==
- "CHWILA – gazeta Żydów lwowskich". www.lwow.home.pl.
