= Democratic List of Nazareth =

Political party in Israel

Democratic List of Nazareth הרשימה הדמוקרטית של נצרת قائمة الناصرة الديمقراطية
- Leader: Seif el-Din el-Zoubi
- Founded: Late 1940s
- Dissolved: 1950s
- National affiliation: Mapai
- Most MKs: 2 (1949–1951)
- Fewest MKs: 2 (1949–1951)

Election symbol
- יד

The Democratic List of Nazareth (Hebrew: רְשִׁימָה דֶּמוֹקְרָטִית שֶׁל נָצְרַת, Reshima Demokratit shel Natzrat; Arabic: قائمة الناصرة الديمقراطية) was an Arab satellite list in Israel and the only Israeli Arab party to win seats in the first Knesset. The party, which was sponsored by David Ben-Gurion's Mapai, was so named as it was based in Nazareth, the largest Arab city in Israel.

== History ==
In the 1949 elections, the Democratic List of Nazareth gained 1.7% of the vote and two seats in the Knesset. It was represented by Seif el-Din el-Zoubi and Amin-Salim Jarjora.

The party was sponsored by Mapai, as Ben Gurion was keen to include Israeli Arabs in the functioning of the state in order to prove Jews and Arabs could co-exist peacefully and productively, and during the 1950s several other Israeli Arab parties associated with Mapai appeared. As a result of the association, the party was part of the coalitions that formed the first and second governments during the first Knesset.

The party did not run in the 1951 election, although el-Zoubi was elected on the list of the Democratic List for Israeli Arabs. Jarjora did not return to the Knesset, but went on to become Mayor of Nazareth in 1954, a position he filled until being replaced by el-Zoubi in 1959.
