= Agriculture and Development =

Agriculture and Development زراعة وتطوير חקלאות ופיתוח
- Hebrew name: חקלאות ופיתוח
- Leader: Faras Hamdan (1951–59); Mahmud Al-Nashaf (1959–61)
- Dissolved: 1961
- Ideology: Israeli Arab interest
- Party affiliation: Mapai
- Most MKs: 1 (1951–1961)
- Fewest MKs: 1 (1951–1961)

Election symbol
- ע

Agriculture and Development (Arabic: زراعة وتطوير, Zira'ah wa-tatwir; Hebrew: חקלאות ופיתוח, Hakla'ut VePituah) was an Arab satellite list in Israel.

== History ==
Agriculture and Development was an Israeli Arab organisation formed to fight the 1951 elections. Like other Israeli Arab parties at the time, it was associated with David Ben-Gurion's Mapai party, as Ben-Gurion was keen to include Israeli Arabs in the functioning of the state in order to prove Jews and Arabs could co-exist peacefully and productively. It drew its support from Arabs living in the central area of Israel.

In the elections, the party won only one seat, taken by its leader, Faras Hamdan. Because of its association with Mapai, the party joined the governing coalition in all four governments of the second Knesset.

In the 1955 elections the party won one seat, retained by Hamdan, and was again part of the coalition.

In the 1959 elections the party again won one seat, and joined the coalition, with Mahmud Al-Nashaf replacing Hamdan as leader. However, the party did not run in the 1961 elections.

== List of Knesset members ==
Name	Years in office	Government roles	Other roles
Mahmud Al-Nashaf	1959–1961		Party leader 1959–1961
Faras Hamdan	1951–1959		Party leader 1951–1959
