= Adolf Berman =

Israeli politician (1906–1978)

- אדולף ברמן
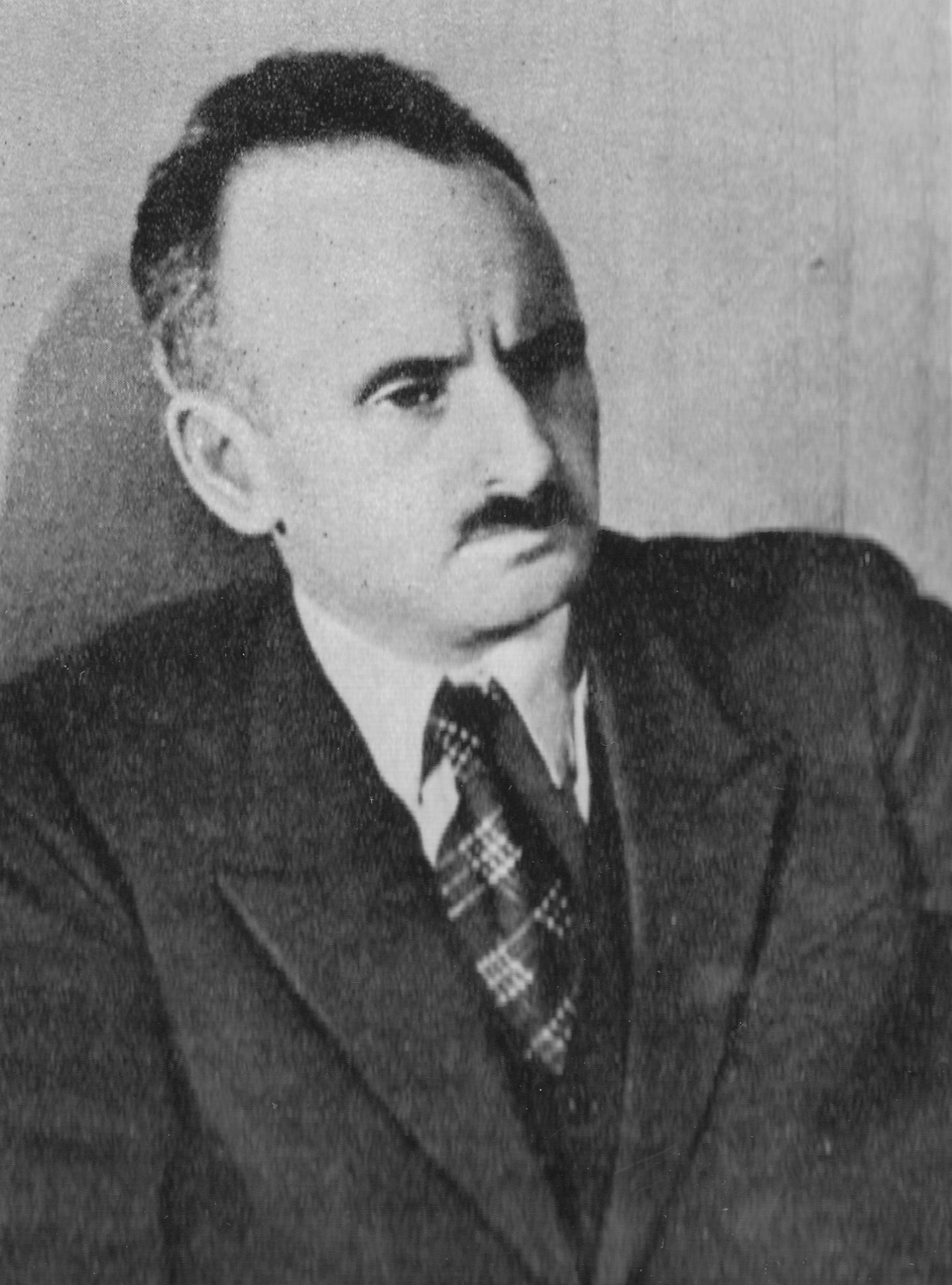

Faction represented in the Knesset
- 1951–1952: Mapam
- 1952–1954: Left Faction
- 1954–1955: Maki

Personal details
- Born: 17 October 1906 Warsaw, Congress Poland, Russian Empire
- Died: 3 February 1978 (aged 71) Tel Aviv, Israel
- Resting place: Nahalat Yitzhak Cemetery, Tel Aviv
- Party: Left Poale Zion; United Jewish Workers Party "Poale Zion"; Mapam; Maki
- Relatives: Jakub Berman (brother)

Adolf Avraham Berman (Polish: Adolf Awraham Berman, Hebrew: אדולף אברהם ברמן, noms de guerre: Adam, Borowski, and Ludwik; 17 October 1906 – 3 February 1978) was a Polish-Israeli activist and communist politician.

== Biography ==
=== Early years ===
Berman was born in Warsaw. His older brother was Jakub Berman, later a prominent communist politician in early post-war Poland. After graduating from the Michał Kreczmar Gymnasium he studied at the University of Warsaw, receiving a doctorate in psychology in 1931. He then worked as a teacher and researcher in psychology, and headed the Warsaw organization of Jewish counseling clinics affiliated with CENTOS, a Polish-Jewish children's aid society. While a student Berman had joined the Jewish Socialist Workers Youth "Młodość" and then the Left Poale Zion, becoming editor of the party's Polish-language organ as well as its Yiddish-language weekly Arbeter Tseitung.

=== World War II ===
During the German occupation of Poland in World War II, Berman was one of the leaders of the Jewish underground in the Warsaw Ghetto. He was a founder of the Anti-Fascist Bloc in 1942 and co-editor of its organ Der Ruf. He was also general secretary of Żegota, the Council to Aid Jews with the Government Delegation for Poland, and director of the aforementioned CENTOS, which both made efforts to rescue Jews during the Holocaust. Berman maintained contact between Żegota and the Polish Workers' Party, and organized meetings with Arie Wilner of the Jewish Combat Organization and Władysław Gomułka of the Polish Workers' Party.

In September 1942, Berman moved to the "Aryan side" of Warsaw together with his wife Basia, who also had been active in the ghetto underground as manager of a network of libraries. Owing to his connections and non-Jewish appearance, Berman was able to promote widespread efforts for the rescue of surviving Jews after the liquidation of the Warsaw Ghetto. He also helped to save written records hidden on the "Aryan side", among them some of the last chronicles recorded by Emanuel Ringelblum. Berman was arrested in January 1944, but was freed through the efforts of Polish friends and the payment of a ransom. From March 1944 he headed the Jewish section of the underground State National Council. In 1944 he took part in the Warsaw Uprising as a member of the political council of the People's Army in Żoliborz.

=== Post-war Poland ===
After the liberation of Poland, Berman served as chairman of the Central Committee of Polish Jews from February 1947. He was elected a member of the Legislative Sejm in the same year. A Zionist, Berman participated in the first post-war Zionist conference held in London in August 1945, and in July 1946 he helped secure free passage for Polish Jews wishing to settle in Palestine under the auspices of Bricha. In October 1947 he became leader of a newly formed political party, the United Jewish Workers Party "Poale Zion". Owing to his support for Zionism, Berman was removed from this position as chairman of the Central Committee for Polish Jews in April 1949.

=== Move to Israel and later years ===
In 1950 Berman left Poland for Israel, where he joined Mapam and was elected to the second Knesset in the 1951 elections; in February 1952 he broke away from Mapam's faction in the Knesset and formed the Left Faction together with Rostam Bastuni and Moshe Sneh. In 1954 Berman joined Maki, where he was elected a member of the central committee and edited the party newspaper Fray Yisroel. He lost his Knesset seat in the 1955 elections.

In 1961, Berman testified at the trial of Adolf Eichmann. He served on the board of Yad Vashem, was a member of the Polish-Israeli Friendship Society, and was involved in the activities of several survivors' organizations and associations of former underground fighters living in Israel. Berman later wrote two books of memoirs describing his underground activities during the Holocaust: Mi-Yeme ha-maḥteret ("The Underground Period", 1971), and Ba-Makom asher ya‘ad li ha-goral: ‘Im Yehude Varshah 1939–1942 ("The Place Where Fate Brought Me: With the Jews of Warsaw, 1939–1942", 1977). Berman died in 1978, at the age of 71.
