= Mapai =

Political party in Israel (1930–1968)

Workers' Party of the Land of Israel מִפְלֶגֶת פּוֹעֲלֵי אֶרֶץ יִשְׂרָאֵל
- Leader: David Ben-Gurion (1930–54); Moshe Sharett (1954–55); David Ben-Gurion (1955–63); Levi Eshkol (1963–68)
- Founders: David Ben-Gurion; Yosef Sprinzak
- Founded: 5 January 1930; 96 years ago
- Dissolved: 23 January 1968; 58 years ago
- Merger of: Ahdut HaAvoda; Hapoel Hatzair
- Merged into: Israeli Labor Party
- Headquarters: Tel Aviv
- Newspaper: Davar
- Ideology: Labor Zionism; Democratic socialism; Social democracy
- Political position: Centre-left to left-wing
- National affiliation: Alignment (1965–1968)
- International affiliation: Socialist International
- Regional affiliation: Asian Socialist Conference
- Colours: Red
- Most MKs: 47 (1959)

Election symbol

Mapai (מַפָּא״י, an abbreviation for מִפְלֶגֶת פּוֹעֲלֵי אֶרֶץ יִשְׂרָאֵל, Mifleget Poalei Eretz Yisrael, lit. 'Workers' Party of the Land of Israel') was a Labor Zionist and democratic socialist political party in Israel and the dominant force in Israeli politics before merging into the Israeli Labor Party in January 1968. During Mapai's time in office, a wide range of progressive reforms were carried out, as characterised by the establishment of a welfare state, urban rehabilitation, compulsory education, and new rights in the workplace.

== History ==
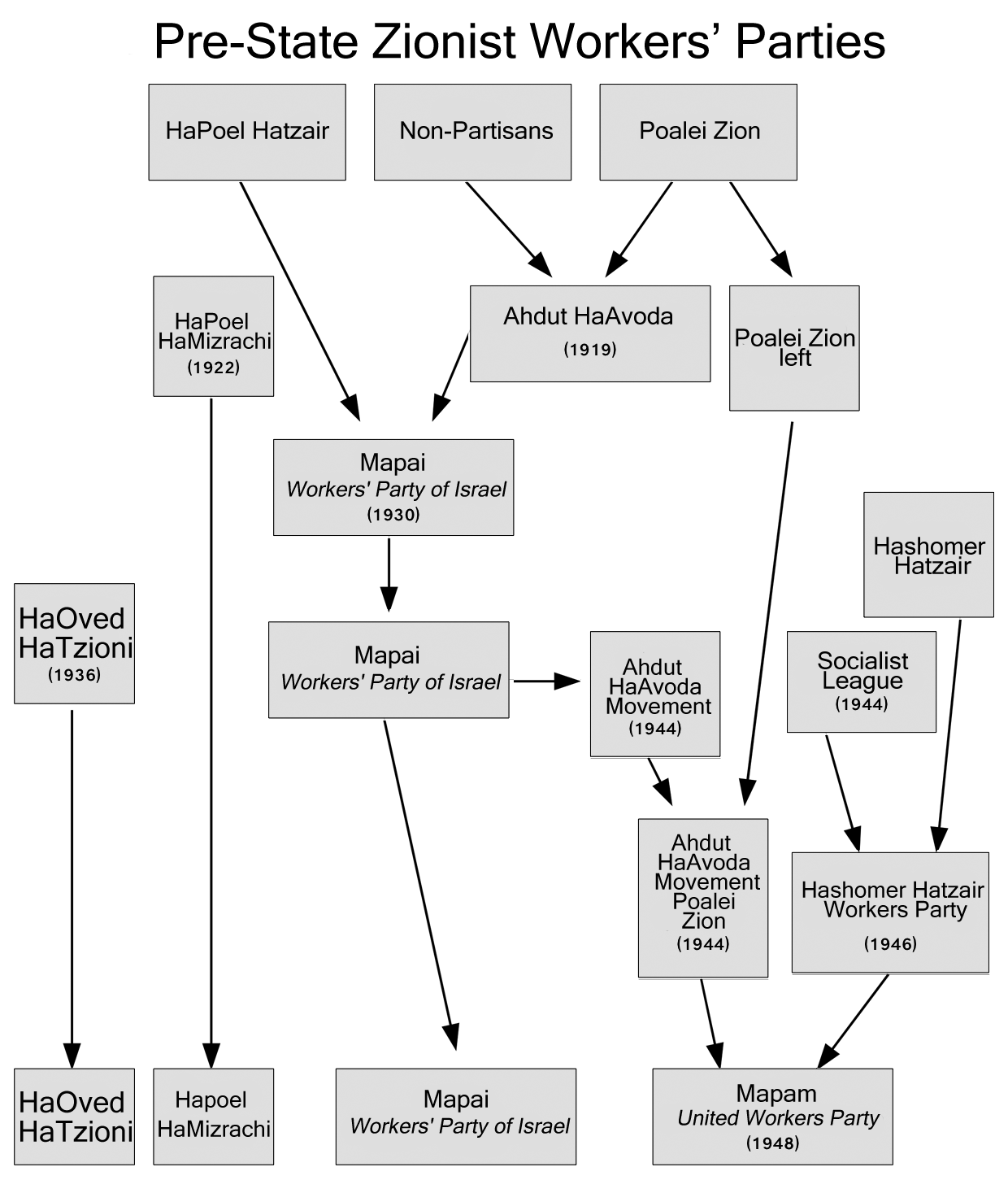
chart of zionist workers parties

The party was founded on 5 January 1930 by the merger of the Hapoel Hatzair, founded by A. D. Gordon, and the original Ahdut HaAvoda (founded in 1919 from the right-leaning, more moderate wing of the Zionist socialist Poale Zion led by David Ben-Gurion). In the early 1920s, the Labor Zionist movement had founded the Histadrut Union, which dominated the Hebrew settlement economy and infrastructure, later making Mapai the dominant political faction in Zionist politics. It was also responsible for the founding of Hashomer and Haganah, the first two armed Jewish groups, which secured the members and property of the new and emerging Jewish communities (i.e., the yishuv). By the early 1930s, Ben-Gurion had taken over the party and had become de facto leader of the Jewish community in Palestine. Mapai was a member of the Labour and Socialist International between 1930 and 1940.

The party was Jewish-only until the late 1960s, with a succession of satellite parties for Israeli Arabs, including the Democratic List of Nazareth, the Democratic List for Israeli Arabs, Agriculture and Development, Progress and Work, Cooperation and Brotherhood, Progress and Development and Cooperation and Development. It supported the policy of subjecting Arab citizens to martial law, included confining them to the towns of their residence and allowing them to exit only with a permit granted by Israeli authorities.

== Politics and government ==
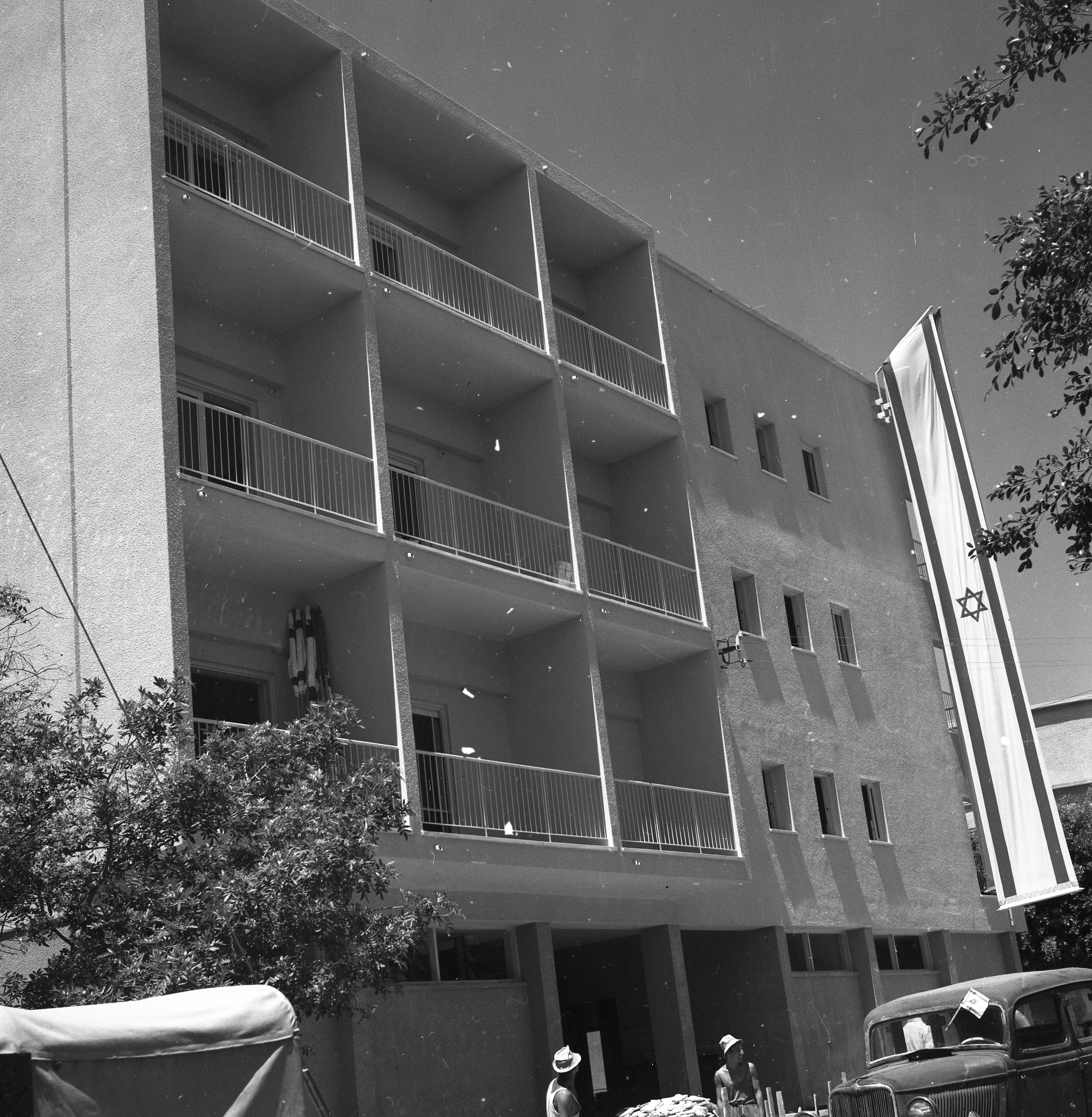
Mapai House (party headquarters), Tel Aviv, 1955

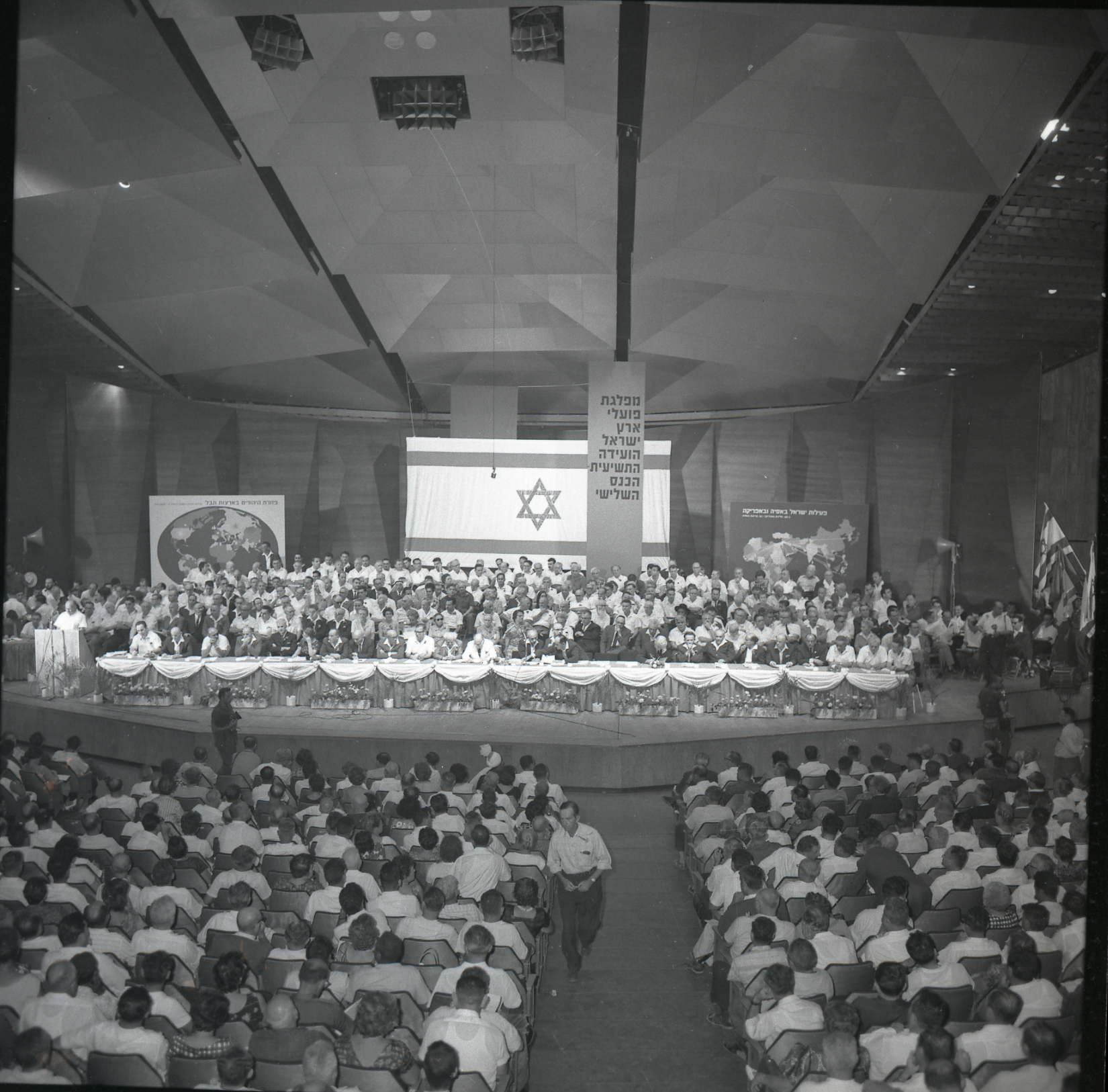
Ninth conference of Mapai in 1963

With the independent statehood gained from the 1948 Arab–Israeli War, the party won large support in the nascent State of Israel's first elections in 1949, receiving 36% of the vote (well ahead of second-placed Mapam's 15%) and winning 46 of the 120 Knesset seats contested. Ben-Gurion became the first Prime Minister of Israel and formed a coalition with the United Religious Front, the Progressive Party, the Sephardim and Oriental Communities and the Democratic List of Nazareth (an Israeli Arab party associated with Mapai). A notable piece of legislation enacted during Mapai's first term in office was an educational law in 1949 that introduced compulsory schooling for all children between the ages of 5 and 14. Mapai's years in office also witnessed the passage of the National Insurance Act of 1953 and the Social Welfare Service Law of 1958, which authorised a broad range of social welfare programmes, including special allowances for large families, workers' compensation provisions, maternity insurance, and old age and survivors' pensions.

In the 1951 legislative elections, Mapai increased its vote share to 37% (47 seats) despite the country's economic problems. Ben-Gurion again formed the government with the support of Mizrachi, Hapoel HaMizrachi, Agudat Yisrael, Poalei Agudat Yisrael and the three Israeli Arab parties associated with Mapai: the Democratic List for Israeli Arabs, Progress and Work and Agriculture and Development. However, he shocked the nation by resigning on 6 December 1953 with the intent to settle in the small Negev kibbutz of Sde Boker; Ben-Gurion was replaced by Moshe Sharett.

The 1955 elections saw a drop in the party's support to 32% (40 seats), though still well ahead of the second-placed Herut (13%). Ben-Gurion returned as Prime Minister and formed a coalition with the National Religious Front (which later changed its name to the National Religious Party), Mapam, Ahdut HaAvoda and the three Israeli Arab parties: the Democratic List for Israeli Arabs, Progress and Work and Agriculture and Development. Later, the Progressive Party was added to the coalition.

In contrast to the previous one, the 1959 election saw a surge in Mapai's support, and the party recorded its strongest electoral performance, taking 38% of the vote and 47 seats. Ben-Gurion again invited the National Religious Party, Mapam, Ahdut HaAvoda, the Progressive Party and the three Israeli Arab parties (Progress and Development, Cooperation and Brotherhood and Agriculture and Development) to form the coalition.

A state inquiry into the Lavon Affair, which brought down the government in 1961, probably contributed to the party's relatively poor performance in the elections that year: it picked up only 35% of the vote and 42 seats. Although Ben-Gurion formed a strong coalition with the National Religious Party, Ahdut HaAvoda, Agudat Yisrael Workers, Cooperation and Brotherhood and Progress and Development, two events during the fifth Knesset precipitated a decline from Mapai's dominance:

- Firstly, Ben-Gurion resigned as head of the party citing personal reasons, but, in reality, he was upset at a perceived lack of support from his colleagues. He created a new party, Rafi, and took seven other Mapai members with him.
- Secondly, the two major opposition parties on the Israeli right, Herut and the Liberal Party, merged into Gahal. This meant by the end of the Knesset session, Mapai had only 34 seats to Gahal's 27.

The party's response to the unprecedented strength of the opposition was to seek support from other parties with similar ideologies. The result was an alliance with Ahdut HaAvoda to form the Labor Alignment before the 1965 election. The new party received 37% of the vote and won 45 seats, and comfortably beat Gahal (26 seats). On 23 January 1968, Mapai, Ahdut HaAvoda and Rafi merged into the Israeli Labor Party and ceased to exist as individual entities.

== Party leaders ==
=== General secretaries ===
- 1930–1954 – David Ben-Gurion
- 1954–1955 – Moshe Sharett
- 1955–1963 – David Ben-Gurion
- 1963–1968 – Levi Eshkol

=== Selection of party leaders ===
Until 1963, the party had no formal rules to govern the selection of its leader. From the party's establishment, David Ben-Gurion was long the unchallenged leader of the party. Even during his brief 1954–1955 retirement (during which Moshe Sharett served as the official party leader), Ben-Gurion was still largely considered the de facto party boss. After Ben-Gurion retired again in 1963, informal consultations by the party's leading figures resulted in an informal consensus to appoint Levi Eshkol as leader; the choice was ratified by the party's Central Committee. Soon after becoming party leader, Eshkol successfully pushed the party to amend its constitution to state that the party's candidate for the office of prime minister—the leader of Israel—would be selected by the party's Central Committee. Therefore, when Ben-Gurion unsuccessfully attempted to retake party leadership in 1965, there was a formal leadership election held by a vote of the party's Central Committee.

== Election results ==
Election	Votes	%	Seats	+/–	Leader
1931	21,497 (#1)	43.5	27 / 71	New	David Ben-Gurion
1944	73,367 (#1)	36.5	64 / 171	▲37	David Ben-Gurion
1949	155,274 (#1)	35.7	46 / 120	▼18	David Ben-Gurion
1951	256,456 (#1)	37.3	45 / 120	▼1	David Ben-Gurion
1955	274,735 (#1)	32.2	40 / 120	▼5	David Ben-Gurion
1959	370,585 (#1)	38.2	47 / 120	▲7	David Ben-Gurion
1961	349,330 (#1)	34.7	42 / 120	▼5	David Ben-Gurion
1965	Part of the Labor Alignment		37 / 120	▼5	Levi Eshkol
