= List of members of the second Knesset =

The 120 members of the second Knesset were elected on 30 July 1951. The breakdown by party was as follows:

- Mapai: 45
- General Zionists: 20
- Mapam: 15
- Hapoel HaMizrachi: 8
- Herut: 8
- Maki: 5
- Progressive Party: 4
- Democratic List for Israeli Arabs: 3
- Agudat Yisrael: 3
- Sephardim and Oriental Communities: 2
- Poalei Agudat Yisrael: 2
- Mizrachi: 2
- Progress and Work: 1
- Yemenite Association: 1
- Agriculture and Development: 1

== List of members ==
Party	Name	Notes
Mapai (45)	Ada Maimon	
Mapai (45)	Akiva Govrin	
Mapai (45)	Ami Assaf	
Mapai (45)	Avraham Herzfeld	
Mapai (45)	Baruch Osnia	
Mapai (45)	Beba Idelson	
Mapai (45)	Bechor-Shalom Sheetrit	
Mapai (45)	Haim Ben-Asher	
Mapai (45)	David Bar-Rav-Hai	
Mapai (45)	David Ben-Gurion	Prime Minister (1951–54), Minister of Defense
Mapai (45)	David Hacohen	Replaced by Baruch Kamin
Mapai (45)	Dvora Netzer	
Mapai (45)	Dov Yosef	
Mapai (45)	Eliezer Kaplan	Replaced by Avraham Kalfon
Mapai (45)	Eliezer Livna	
Mapai (45)	Eliyahu Hacarmeli	Replaced by Shlomo Hillel
Mapai (45)	Efraim Taburi	
Mapai (45)	Golda Meir	
Mapai (45)	Herzl Berger	
Mapai (45)	Yisrael Guri	
Mapai (45)	Jenia Tversky	
Mapai (45)	Yosef Sprinzak	
Mapai (45)	Kadish Luz	
Mapai (45)	Levi Eshkol	
Mapai (45)	Meir Argov	
Mapai (45)	Mordechai Namir	
Mapai (45)	Moshe Sharett	Prime Minister (1954–55), Minister of Foreign Affairs
Mapai (45)	Peretz Naftali	
Mapai (45)	Pinhas Lavon	
Mapai (45)	Reuven Feldman	
Mapai (45)	Reuven Shari	
Mapai (45)	Sarah Kafrit	
Mapai (45)	Shlomo Lavi	
Mapai (45)	Shmuel Dayan	
Mapai (45)	Zalman Shazar	
Mapai (45)	Ya'akov Uri	
Mapai (45)	Ya'akov Shimshon Shapira	
Mapai (45)	Yehezkel Hen	Replaced by Rachel Tzabari
Mapai (45)	Yisrael Yeshayahu	
Mapai (45)	Yitzhak Ben-Zvi	Replaced by Ya'akov Nitzani
Mapai (45)	Yizhar Smilansky	
Mapai (45)	Yona Kesse	
Mapai (45)	Yosef Efrati	
Mapai (45)	Zalman Aran	
Mapai (45)	Ze'ev Shefer	
General Zionists (20)	Avraham Stop	
General Zionists (20)	Batsheva Katznelson	
General Zionists (20)	Ben-Zion Harel	
General Zionists (20)	Haim Ariav	
General Zionists (20)	Haim Boger	
General Zionists (20)	Elimelekh Rimalt	
General Zionists (20)	Ezra Ichilov	
General Zionists (20)	George Flash	
General Zionists (20)	Israel Rokach	
General Zionists (20)	Nahum Het	
General Zionists (20)	Peretz Bernstein	
General Zionists (20)	Shalom Zisman	
General Zionists (20)	Shimon Bejarano	
General Zionists (20)	Shlomo Perlstein	
General Zionists (20)	Shoshana Parsitz	
General Zionists (20)	Simha Babah	
General Zionists (20)	Ya'akov Klivnov	
General Zionists (20)	Yosef Sapir	
General Zionists (20)	Yosef Serlin	
General Zionists (20)	Zalman Suzayiv	
Mapam (15)	Eliezer Peri	
Mapam (15)	Hanan Rubin	
Mapam (15)	Meir Ya'ari	Leader of the Opposition (1952-55)
Mapam (15)	Mordechai Bentov	
Mapam (15)	Ya'akov Hazan	
Mapam (15)	Ya'akov Riftin	
Mapam (15)	Aharon Zisling	Left Mapam to establish Ahdut HaAvoda - Poale Zion
Mapam (15)	Israel Bar-Yehuda	Left Mapam to establish Ahdut HaAvoda - Poale Zion
Mapam (15)	Moshe Aram	Left Mapam to establish Ahdut HaAvoda - Poale Zion
Mapam (15)	Yitzhak Ben-Aharon	Left Mapam to establish Ahdut HaAvoda - Poale Zion
Mapam (15)	David Livschitz	Left Mapam to establish the Faction independent of Ahdut HaAvoda, before joining Mapai
Mapam (15)	Hannah Lamdan	Left Mapam to establish the Faction independent of Ahdut HaAvoda, before joining Mapai
Mapam (15)	Adolf Berman	Left Mapam to establish the Left Faction, before joining Maki
Mapam (15)	Moshe Sneh	Left Mapam to establish the Left Faction, before joining Maki
Mapam (15)	Rostam Bastuni	Left Mapam to establish the Left Faction, before returning to Mapam
Hapoel HaMizrachi (8)	Eliyahu-Moshe Ganhovsky	
Hapoel HaMizrachi (8)	Haim-Moshe Shapira	
Hapoel HaMizrachi (8)	Michael Hasani	
Hapoel HaMizrachi (8)	Moshe Kelmer	
Hapoel HaMizrachi (8)	Moshe Unna	
Hapoel HaMizrachi (8)	Yitzhak Rafael	
Hapoel HaMizrachi (8)	Yosef Burg	
Hapoel HaMizrachi (8)	Zerach Warhaftig	
Herut (8)	Aryeh Altman	
Herut (8)	Aryeh Ben-Eliezer	Replaced by Haim Cohen-Meguri
Herut (8)	Binyamin Avniel	
Herut (8)	Esther Raziel-Naor	
Herut (8)	Haim Landau	
Herut (8)	Menachem Begin	
Herut (8)	Ya'akov Meridor	Replaced by Eliezer Shostak
Herut (8)	Yohanan Bader	
Maki (5)	Emile Habibi	
Maki (5)	Esther Vilenska	
Maki (5)	Meir Vilner	
Maki (5)	Shmuel Mikunis	
Maki (5)	Tawfik Toubi	
Progressive Party (4)	Avraham Granot	Replaced by Yeshayahu Forder
Progressive Party (4)	Moshe Kol	Replaced by Idov Cohen
Progressive Party (4)	Pinchas Rosen	
Progressive Party (4)	Yizhar Harari	
Democratic List for Israeli Arabs (3)	Jabr Moade	
Democratic List for Israeli Arabs (3)	Masaad Kassis	
Democratic List for Israeli Arabs (3)	Seif el-Din el-Zubi	
Agudat Yisrael (3)	Avraham Deutsch	Replaced by Zalman Ben-Ya'akov
Agudat Yisrael (3)	Shlomo Lorincz	
Agudat Yisrael (3)	Yitzhak-Meir Levin	
Sephardim and Oriental Communities (2)	Binyamin Sasson	Party merged into the General Zionists
Sephardim and Oriental Communities (2)	Eliyahu Eliashar	Party merged into the General Zionists
Poalei Agudat Yisrael (2)	Binyamin Mintz	
Poalei Agudat Yisrael (2)	Kalman Kahana	
Mizrachi (2)	David-Zvi Pinkas	Replaced by Shlomo-Yisrael Ben-Meir
Mizrachi (2)	Mordechai Nurock	
Progress and Work (1)	Salah-Hassan Hanifes	
Yemenite Association (1)	Shimon Garidi	Party merged into the General Zionists, then broke away again
Agriculture and Development (1)	Faras Hamdan	

=== Replacements ===
MK	Replaced	Party	Date	Notes
Idov Cohen	Moshe Kol	Progressive Party	10 September 1951	
Yeshayahu Forder	Avraham Granot	Progressive Party	10 September 1951	
Eliezer Shostak	Ya'akov Meridor	Herut	2 November 1951	
Rachel Tzabari	Yehezkel Hen	Mapai	4 April 1952	
Avraham Kalfon	Eliezer Kaplan	Mapai	13 July 1952	
Shlomo-Yisrael Ben-Meir	David-Zvi Pinkas	Mizrachi	14 August 1952	
Ya'akov Nitzani	Yitzhak Ben-Zvi	Mapai	8 December 1952	
Shlomo Hillel	Eliyahu Hacarmeli	Mapai	21 December 1952	
Zalman Ben-Ya'akov	Avraham Deutsch	Agudat Yisrael	24 June 1953	
Haim Cohen-Meguri	Aryeh Ben-Eliezer	Herut	6 July 1953	
Baruch Kamin	David Hacohen	Mapai	1 December 1953	
