= Tzabari =

Tzabari (Hebrew: צברי) is a Jewish surname. People with the surname include:

- Pinhas Tzabari (born 1956), Israeli politician
- Rachel Tzabari (1909–1995), Israeli politician
- Simha Tzabari (1913–2004), Israeli politician
