= Jerusalem Emergency Committee =

The Jerusalem Emergency Committee (Vaadat Hamosadot Le-Inyanai Youshalayim) was a seven-man group set up in December 1947 by the Jewish Agency for Israel to take over the civil administration of Jewish Jerusalem as the British mandate over Palestine came to an end. Originally Golda Meyerson was to have been a member. It was partly in reaction to the creation of a similar group by Vaad Hakehilla, the city's Jewish Community Council.

The committee consisted of David Aboulafia, Daniel Auster, Charles Passman, Hayim Salomon, Reuven Shari, Yitzhak Rafael (Werfel), and was headed by Dov Joseph. Its main responsibility was the supply and distribution of food and fuel to the Jewish population of Jerusalem. In March local Palestinian militias succeeded in closing the road to the city for all Jewish traffic except heavily armoured convoys. The committee introduced unpopular rationing and price controls on bread and meat. With the departure of the British Army the committee established a police force consisting of 400 former members of the Palestine Police Force. It also took charge of the postal service, schools and radio station. At the end of May the committee re-housed 1,500 refugees from the Old City in empty houses in Katamon.

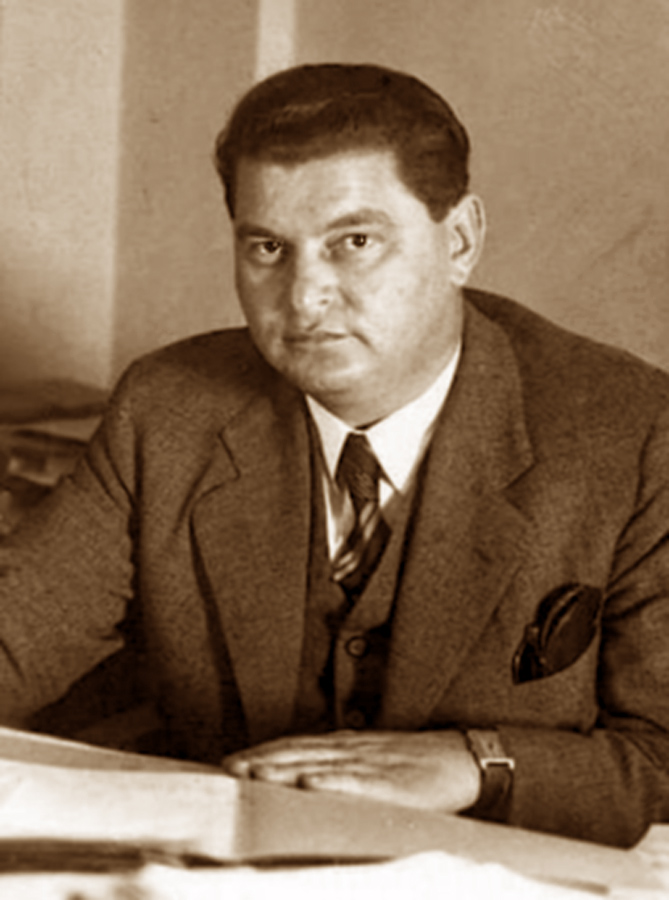
Daniel Auster

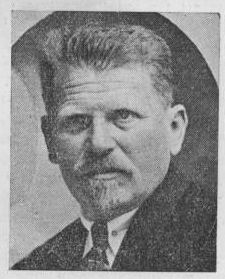
Hayim Salomon

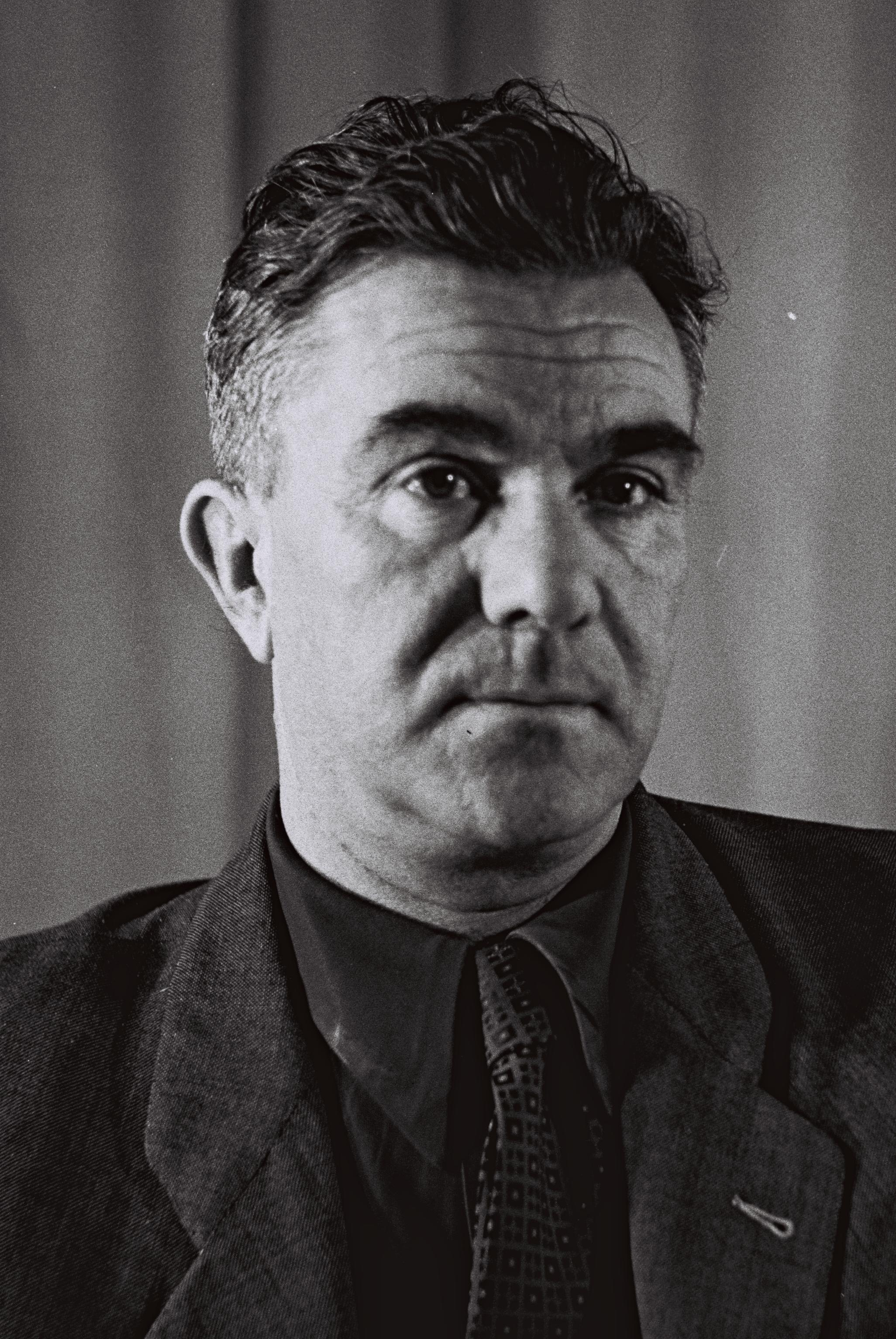
Reuven Shari

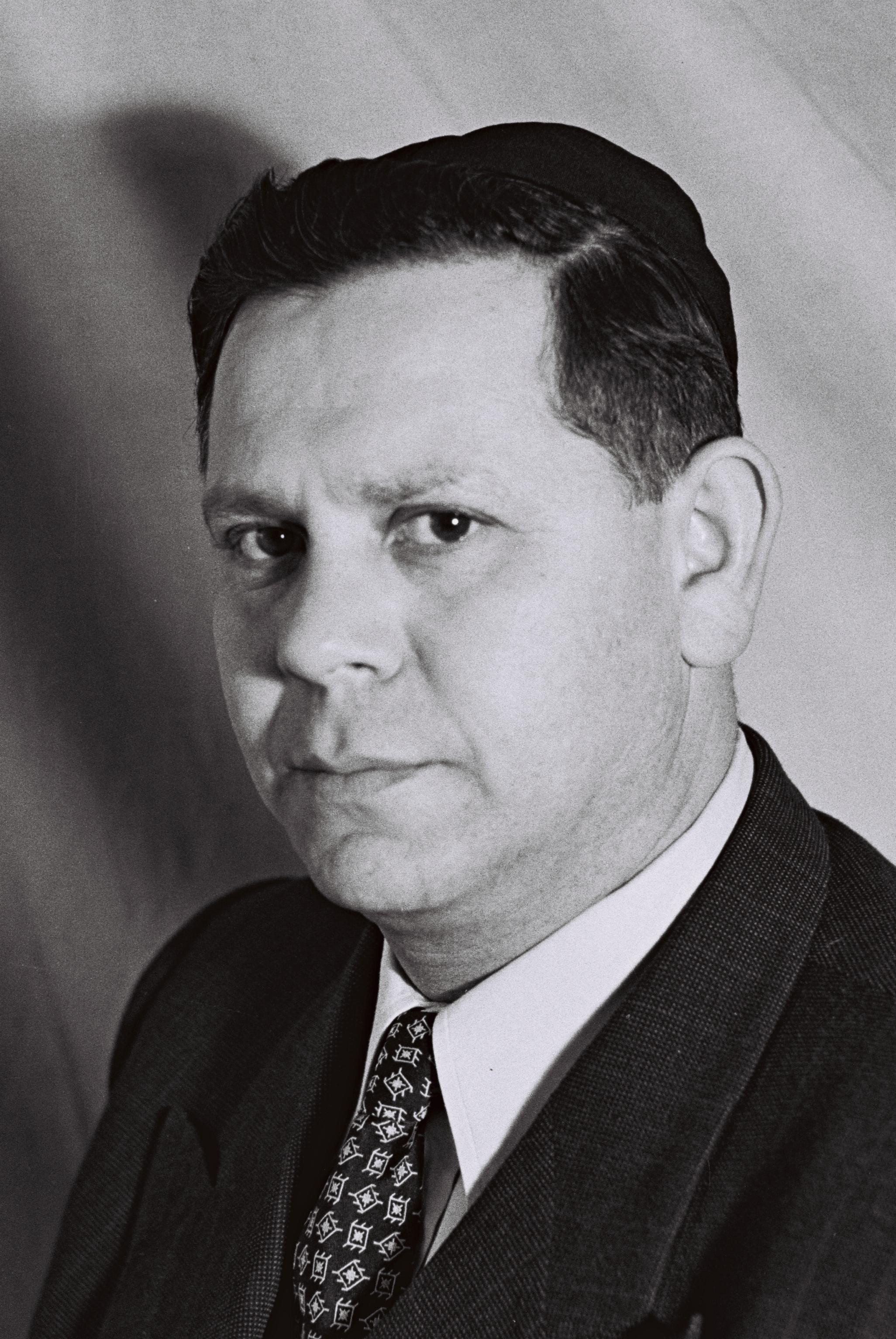
Yitzhak Rafael (Werfel)

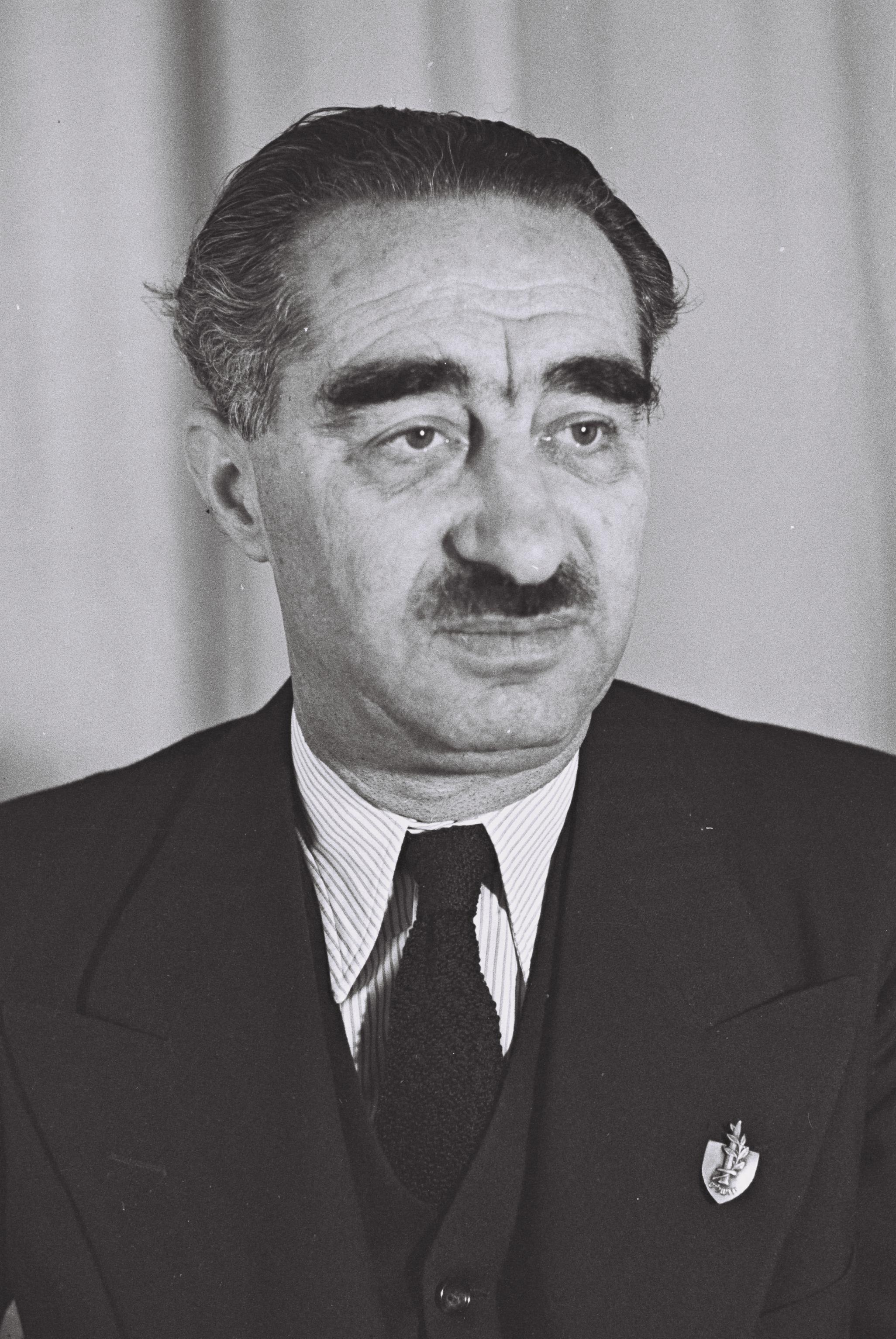
Dov Joseph

The committee's headquarters were located in the Sansur Building on Zion Square.

A week before the beginning of the first truce in June 1948 a telegraph link with Tel Aviv was made and on June 17 the postal service with the rest of Israel was resumed. During the truce civilians could only leave the city if they had a permit from the committee.

== See also ==
- Battle for Jerusalem (1948)
