= Radwan Al Hilu =

Palestinian politician (1909–1975)

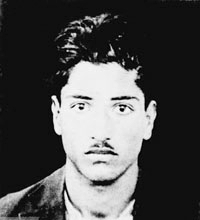

General Secretary of the Palestine Communist Party
- In office 1934–1943

Personal details
- Born: 1909 Jaffa, Ottoman Palestine
- Died: 1975 (aged 65–66) Jericho, State of Palestine

Radwan Al Hilu (1909–1975) was a Palestinian Arab politician who was the leader of the Palestine Communist Party between 1934 and 1943. He was the first Arab to hold the post and used the pseudonym Musa.

== Biography ==
Al Hilu was born in Jaffa, Ottoman Palestine, in 1909, into a poor working-class Christian Orthodox family. He was a member of the Palestine Communist Party being part of the mainstream faction. He and Bulus Farah were sent to Moscow for leadership training at the Communist University of the Toilers of the East.

In 1934, Al Hilu was appointed by the Comintern as the secretary general of the party. His appointment was a result of the Comintern's efforts of the Arabization in the party of which most members were Jewish. He held the post until November 1943 when he resigned from the party due to internal conflicts.

Al Hilu had an affair with Simha Tzabari who was also a member of the Palestinian Communist Party.

Al Hilu died in Jericho in 1975.
