= Pauline Rose =

South African-born British-Israeli author (1898–1973)

- Born: 2 September 1898; Johannesburg, South African Republic
- Died: September 20, 1973 (aged 75); Jerusalem, Israel
- Occupations: Author; Messianic Jewish leader
- Years active: 1944–1973
- Known for: Lay leader of Israeli Messianic Judaism in mid‑20th century; founding the Jerusalem Fellowship
- Notable work: Siege of Jerusalem: Selected Writings of Pauline Rose (2016); Window on Mount Zion (1973)
- Spouse: Albert Rose

Pauline Rose (September 2, 1898 – September 20, 1973) was a South African-born author and leader in the Messianic Jewish movement. She helped to establish a Messianic Jewish community in Jerusalem in the 1960s, and she wrote books about her experiences in the 1948 Battle for Jerusalem and the Six-Day War in 1967.

== Early life and marriage ==
Pauline Rose was born Pesyah Robinson on September 2, 1898, into a Jewish family in Johannesburg, South Africa. Her father was Rabbi Shaul Robinson. As a young woman, she studied piano, watercolor painting, and dressmaking. She married Albert (Azriel) Rose, a successful ostrich feather merchant originally from Lithuania, and the younger brother of Max Rose, the "ostrich feather king of South Africa." The couple had one son, who died young. Rose later described his death as an important influence on her religious journey.

== Spiritual journey ==
Rose studied several religious and philosophical traditions, including theosophy and Eastern mysticism. She later became a believer in Jesus as the Messiah while continuing to identify as Jewish. She rejected traditional church doctrines and emphasized a Jewish understanding of Jesus and the Torah.

== World War II and London years ==
In 1931, the Roses moved to London. Albert prospered as a property developer, while Pauline worked as a fashion designer and continued studying religious and philosophical ideas. During World War II, they developed Heston Farm in the Hounslow district of London, which became known for innovative agriculture. In 1944, Pauline joined the Messianic Jewish community in England led by Abram Poljak and became a proponent of believing in Jesus while adhering to Jewish practices. Albert continued to live a traditional Jewish life and did not follow his wife's new beliefs, although the couple apparently lived in harmony for many years after Pauline's conversion.

== Work in Jerusalem ==
In 1946, Rose visited Palestine. She returned to England later that year, but came back to Palestine in 1948 amidst the Arab-Israeli War. Her book Siege of Jerusalem documents her experiences during the Battle for Jerusalem. During the fighting, Rose assisted neighbors and members of the Messianic community. Her diary entry from May 18, 1948 recounts one of her experiences:

The enemy surrounds us -- is on our doorstep! Terrible battles are in progress. All sections of the Jewish city are being shelled. . . . Jerusalem is like a city under sentence of death, bearing within it the certainty of life.

During this period, Rose and several others established the Jerusalem Fellowship.

In August 1948, Rose and several others were abducted by the Stern Gang, who suspected them of being British spies. They were later released following public outcry.

== Later years ==
In 1959, Pauline and Albert Rose settled permanently on Mount Zion in Jerusalem. There, they restored a derelict house and established "Ha-Ohel" ("The Tent"), which became a center for dialogue and hospitality. During the Six-Day War, Rose made an Israeli flag that was carried into battle and raised above the Tower of David. Her second book, Window on Mount Zion, recounts these events.

In 1965, Rose established a ministry on Mount Zion that brought together Jews, Arabs, and Christians. By the mid-1970s, the original Jerusalem Fellowship had dissolved.

Vered Hillel has described Rose as an unusual female leader within the predominantly male Messianic Jewish movement, while noting that her later parachurch work more closely conformed to prevailing gender expectations.

== Death ==
Pauline Rose died of cancer on September 20, 1973. Albert Rose died in 1977. They are buried on Mount Zion in Jerusalem.

== Works ==
- Rose, Pauline. Siege of Jerusalem: Selected Writings of Pauline Rose (2016).
- Rose, Pauline. Window on Mount Zion (1973).
- Rose, Pauline. "The Jewish Christian Community." Hervormde Teologiese Studies, vol. 14, no. 4, 1959, pp. 177–79.

== See also ==
- Messianic Judaism
- Battle for Jerusalem
