= Battle for Jerusalem =

1947–1948 battle in the First Arab–Israeli War

- Part of the 1947–1949 Palestine war
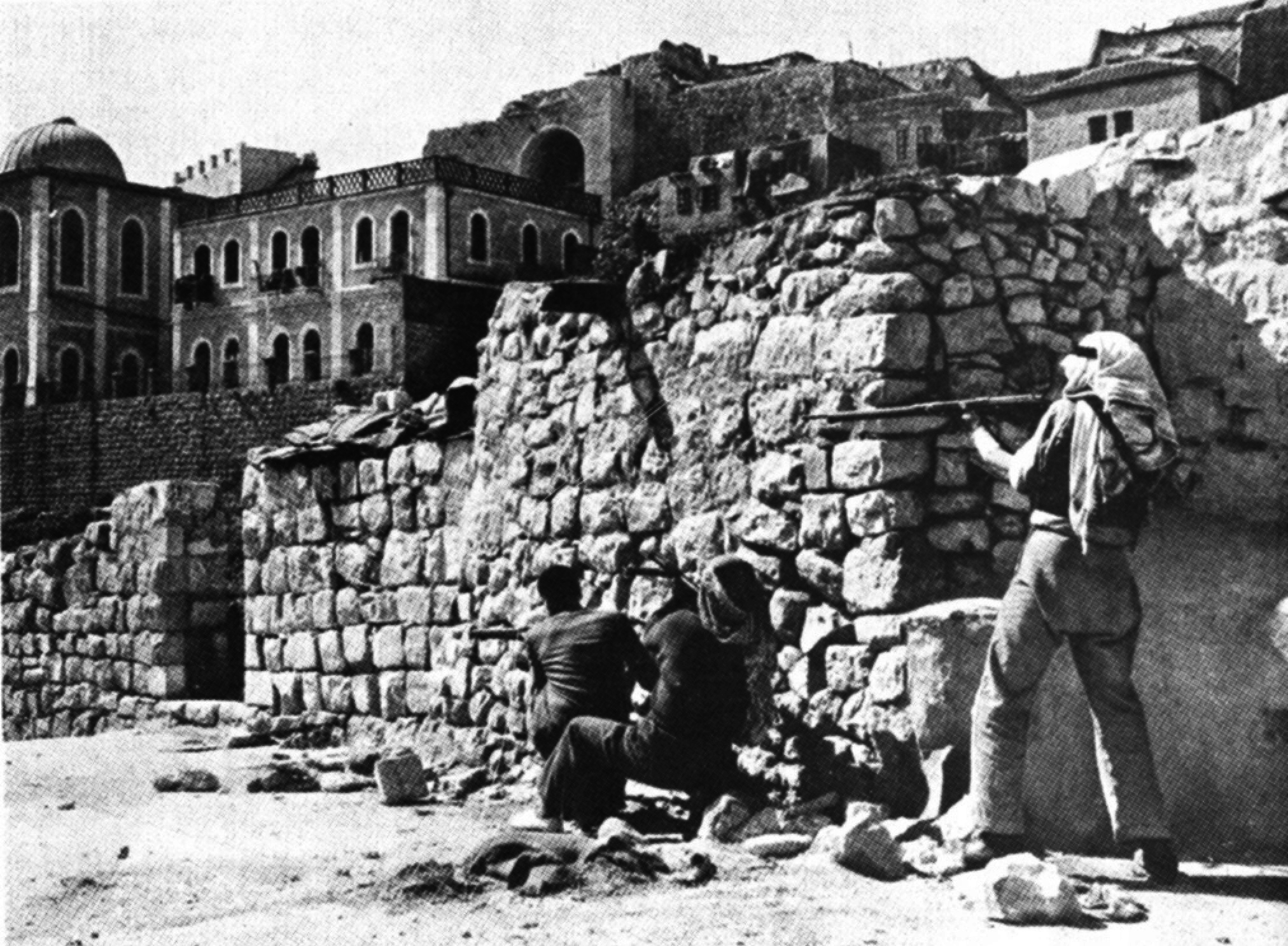
- The Arab Legion besieging the Jewish Quarter of Jerusalem, May 1948
Date	December 1947 – 18 July 1948
Location	Jerusalem, British Mandate of Palestine
Result	Inconclusive
Territorial changes	East Jerusalem and the Old City fall under Jordanian control; West Jerusalem falls under Israeli control

Belligerents
Israel Before May 1948: Haganah; Palmach; Irgun; Lehi; After May 1948: Israel Defense Forces; Etzion Brigade; Harel Brigade	Transjordan; Egypt; Palestinian Arab militias

Commanders and leaders
David Shaltiel; Dov Yosef	Abdullah el Tell; Abd al-Qader al-Husseini; John Bagot Glubb

Strength
10,000 troops	6,000 Jordanian troops 2,000 Egyptian troops 500 Palestinian militia

Casualties and losses
700 military dead Up to 600 civilians killed	Unknown

The Battle for Jerusalem took place during the 1947–1948 civil war phase of the 1947–1949 Palestine war. It saw Jewish and Arab militias in Mandatory Palestine, and later the militaries of Israel and Transjordan, fight for control over the city of Jerusalem. Under the 1947 United Nations Partition Plan for Palestine, Jerusalem was to be a corpus separatum (lit. 'separated body') administered by an international body. Fighting nevertheless immediately broke out in the city between Jewish and Arab militias, with bombings and other attacks being carried out by both sides.

Beginning in February 1948, Arab militias under Abd al-Qadir al-Husayni blockaded the corridor from Tel Aviv to Jerusalem, preventing food and essential supplies from reaching the Jewish population. This blockade was broken in mid-April of that year by Jewish militias who carried out Operation Nachshon and Operation Maccabi, both part of the Zionist offensive known as Plan Dalet. On 14 May and the following days, the Etzioni and Harel brigades, supported by Irgun troops, launched several operations that aimed to take over the Arab side of the city. In the meantime, the Arab Legion had deployed in the area of the former British Mandate that was allotted to the Arab state, not entering the corpus separatum but massively garrisoning Latrun to blockade West Jerusalem once again.

Israeli victories against the Arab militias in the city pushed Abdullah I of Jordan to order the Arab Legion to intervene. Jordanian forces deployed in East Jerusalem, fought the Israelis and took the Jewish Quarter of the Old City, following which the population was expelled and fighters taken as prisoners of war to Jordan. Israeli forces launched three assaults on Latrun to free the road to the city but without success; they then built an alternative road to Jerusalem before the truce imposed by the United Nations on 11 June and successfully broke the blockade. During the period known as the First Truce, West Jerusalem was supplied with food, ammunition, weapons and troops. Fighting did not resume during the remaining months of the 1948 war. Jerusalem was split between Israel and Jordan after the war, with Israel controlling West Jerusalem and Jordan controlling East Jerusalem along with the Old City.

== Overview ==
Aside from having a large Jewish population, Jerusalem held special importance to the Yishuv for "religious and nationalist" reasons.

== Blockade at Latrun and Bab al-Wad ==
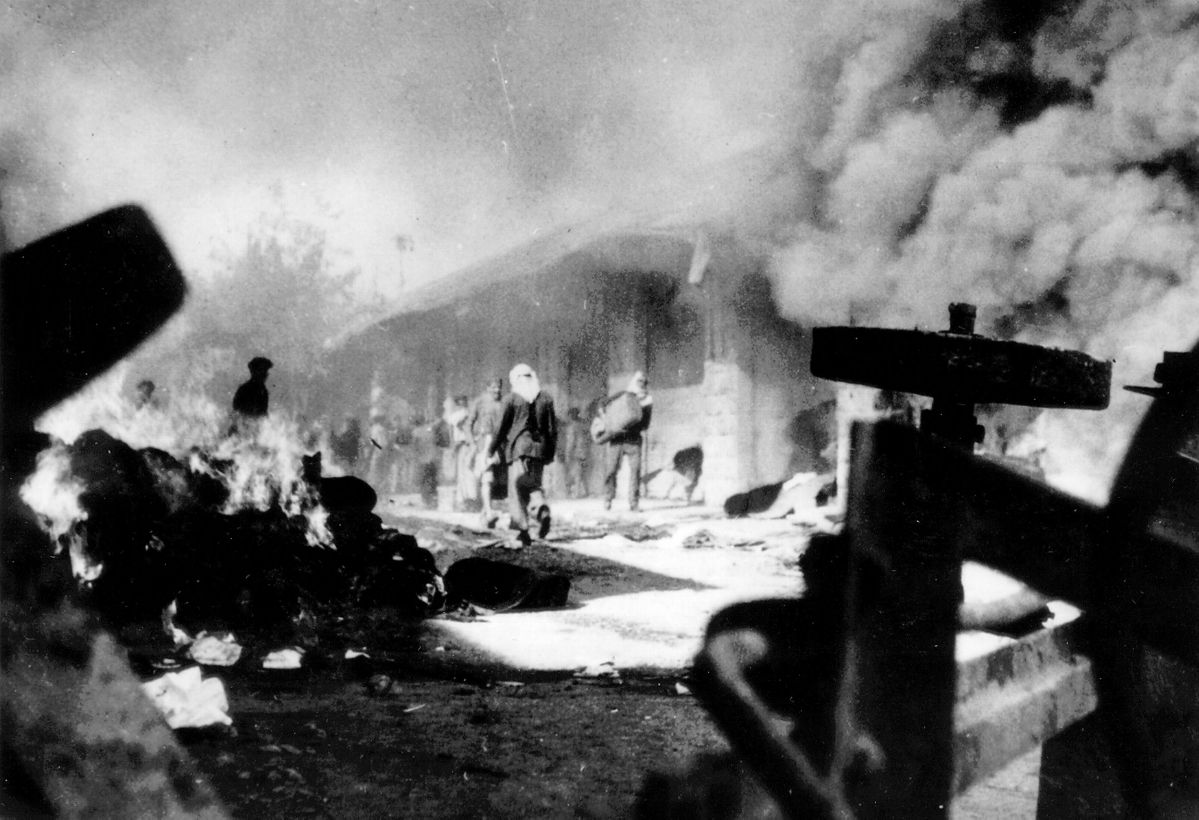
Arabs attack the commercial center 2 December 1947

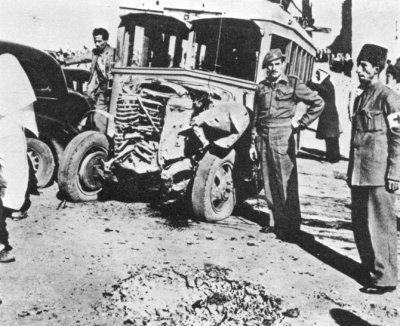
Bomb attack by Irgun on 29 December 1947

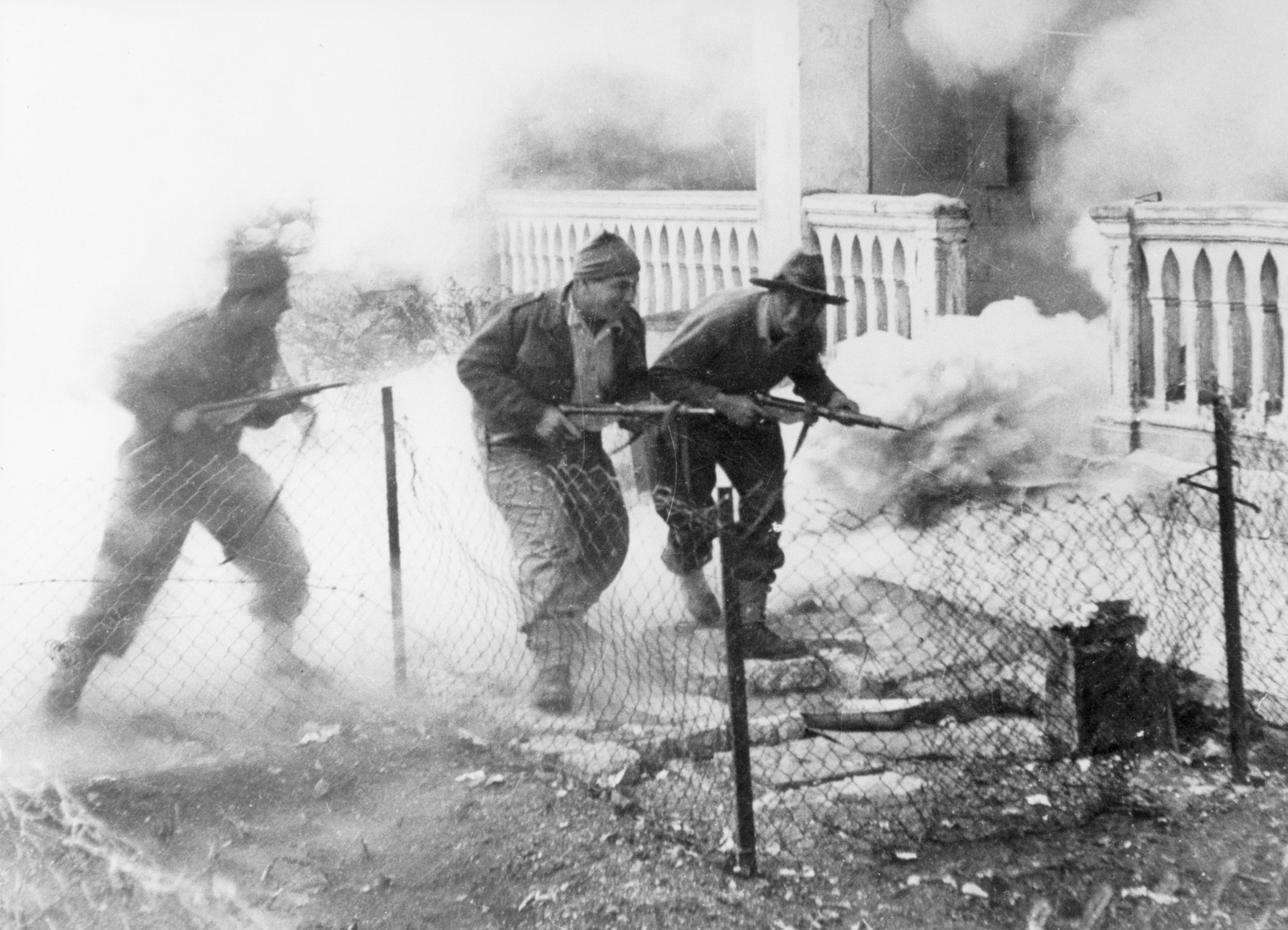
Palmach soldiers attack the San Simon monastery in Katamon, Jerusalem, April 1948 (battle reconstruction)

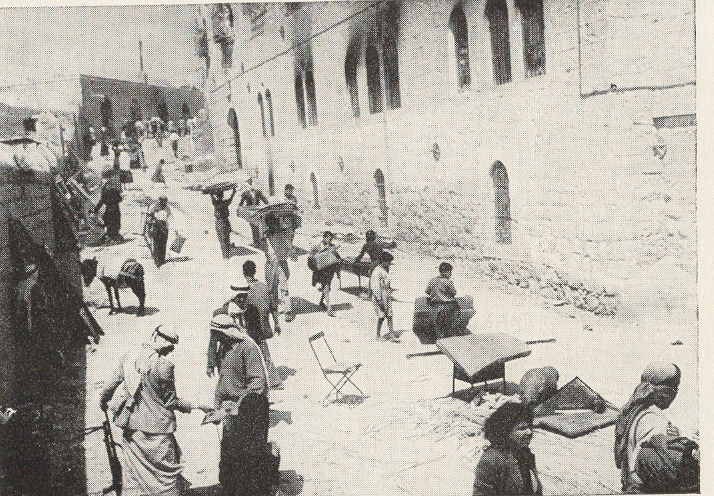
Arab plundering of the Jewish Quarter after its inhabitants' expulsion

Following the outbreak of disturbances at the end of 1947, the road between Tel Aviv and Jewish Jerusalem became increasingly difficult for Jewish vehicles. Arab forces tried to cut off the road to Jerusalem from the coastal plain, where the majority of the Jewish population resided. The Arabs blocked access to Jerusalem "at Latrun and Bab al-Wad," a narrow valley surrounded by Arab villages on hills on both sides. The breaking of the siege of Jerusalem and the annexation of the captured areas to the Jewish state became primary goals for the Israelis in the 1948 Arab–Israeli War. Ambushes by Palestinian Arab irregulars became more frequent and more sophisticated. The intention of the besieging forces was to isolate the 100,000 Jewish residents of the city from the rest of the Jewish inhabitants of Palestine and, in the case of the Jordanian forces, to capture East Jerusalem, including the Old City.

In December 1947 the Jewish Agency set up the Jerusalem Emergency Committee, headed by Dov Yosef, which stockpiled food and fuel. In January the Committee estimated 4,500 tons a month was needed. They were given 50,000 Palestine pounds credit with the Histadrut's wholesalers, Hamashbir Hamerkazi. In January 1948 the number of trucks supplying Jewish Jerusalem had fallen to thirty per day. By March the daily average number of trucks reaching Jerusalem was six. By the end of March it was clear that food supplies for civilians in Jewish Jerusalem would run out. On 1 April The Times estimated that the Jewish population of Jerusalem required a minimum of 50 truckloads of supplies per week. On 3 April, The Scotsman reported that a spokesman at a meeting of Arab military leaders in Damascus had announced that Jerusalem would be "strangled" by a blockade.

One estimate of the size of the opposing forces at the beginning of March 1948 gives the Arabs 5,300 men in Jerusalem and surrounding district, including 300 Iraqi irregulars and 60 Yugoslav Muslims. Jewish forces included the Haganah's Etzioni Brigade of 1,200 with another 1,200 second-line troops, commanded by David Shaltiel. In addition there was a Jewish Home Guard of 2,500, and 500 members of the dissident organisations, Irgun and Lehi.

== Operation Nachshon ==
In early April—as part of Plan Dalet, a Zionist military plan and offensive to conquer of territory in Mandatory Palestine in preparation for the establishment of a Jewish state—the Haganah was launched Operation Nachshon to clear the strategic hilltop villages along the last few miles of the road to Jerusalem.

At the same time a series of massive armoured convoys, involving hundreds of vehicles, forced their way through.

The fighting led to the evacuation of the Jewish villages of Atarot (17 May) and Neve Yaakov (18 May) near Jerusalem, and Kalya and Beit HaArava near the Dead Sea (both on 20 May), as well as the expulsion of the Jewish inhabitants of the Old City of Jerusalem. The defenders of the Jewish Quarter surrendered to the Arab Legion on 28 May 1948, this leading to the forced evacuation of all Jewish inhabitants.

=== Convoys ===
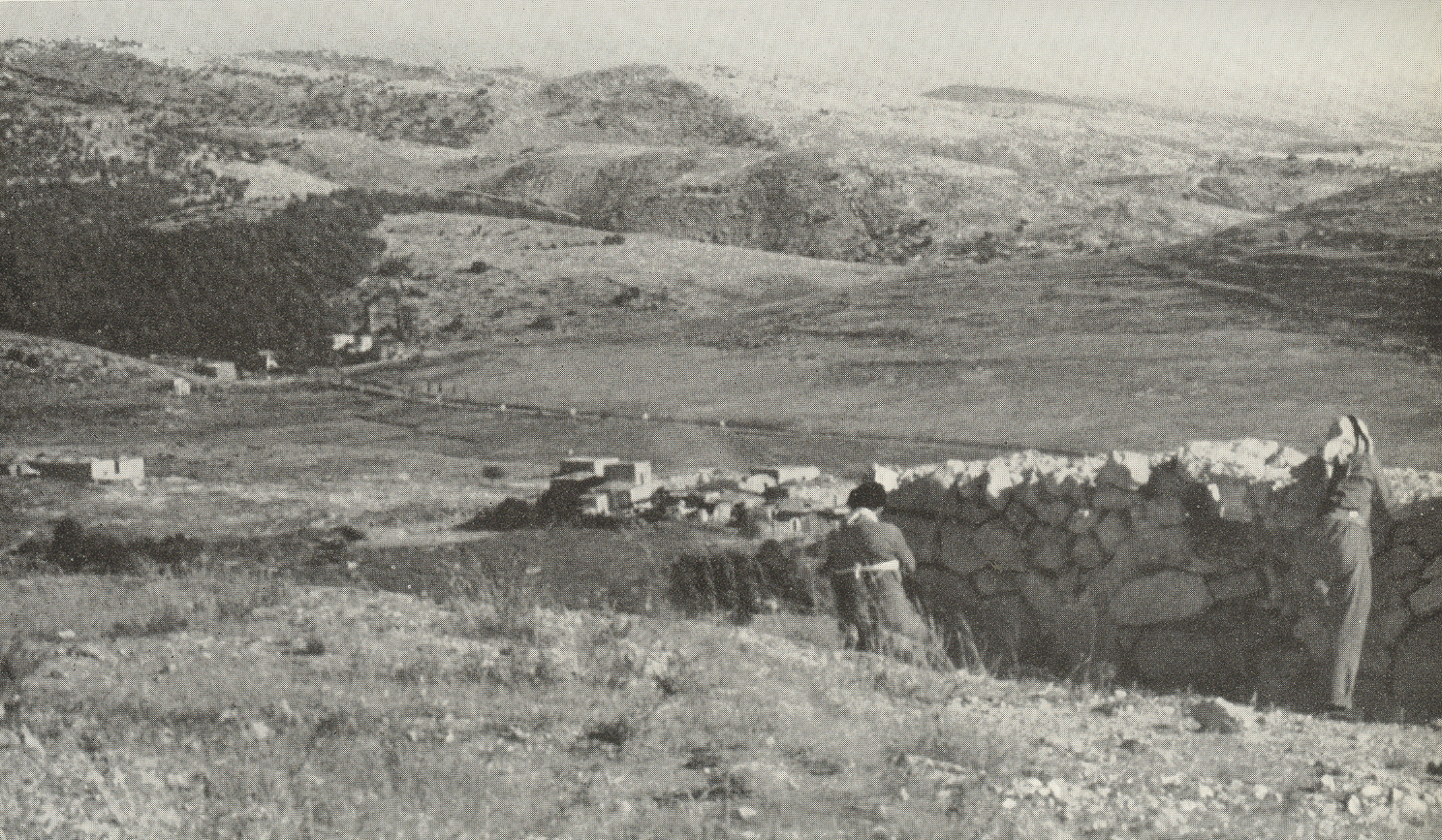
View of the road to Jerusalem entering Bab al-Wad seen from the Arab Legion positions at Latrun

Dov Yosef listed the problems faced in relieving Jewish Jerusalem as:

- The lack of heavy war equipment such as planes and artillery.
- The nature of the terrain.
- The density of Arab population.
- No Jewish settlements in the area.

In addition there was the British ban on the carrying of weapons. On 17 March six members of the Palmach accompanying a convoy were killed in a clash with the British Army. At the end of March the decision was taken to resist arms searches.

On 17 March a 16-vehicle convoy reached the city without incident. But the following week a two-mile-long, 80-vehicle convoy came under attack, and five passengers were killed. Dov Yosef refers to a convoy being "wiped out", 27 March, but gives no details. Two days later a 60-vehicle convoy came under attack at Hulda and was forced to turn back with 17 Jews and five Arabs killed. Five captured vehicles were driven to Ramle. A food convoy escorted by the Palmach reached the city on 6 April without casualties despite being ambushed at Dir Muhsein by a force of "150 Arabs ... joined by 80 Arabs from Abu Shushe." It also survived a second road block at Kolonia, "whose militiamen had repeatedly attacked", taking six hours to reach its destination.

To coincide with Nachshon, Dov Yosef was given £100,000 and Haganah authority to conscript as many men and trucks as he needed. He proceeded to assemble three large convoys at Bilu Camp with a stockpile of 10,000 tons of supplies. He obtained 150 trucks from the Solel Boneh–Shelev Transport Co-operative. A Haganah field force requisitioned a further 150 trucks with their drivers and conscripted 1,000 men as labourers. On 15 April 131 trucks with 550 tons of food reached the city without being attacked. The supplies included 230 tons of flour and 800 pounds of chocolate. Two days later 300 trucks arrived in the Jewish enclave with 1,000 tons of supplies, also without incident. The third convoy on 20 April had a harder time. Consisting of 300 trucks with 2,000 Haganah and Irgun troops, the convoy battled all day to get through. Twenty trucks were knocked out, ten Jews were killed and 30 wounded. Also, during Nachshon, there was a secret convoy that brought 1,500 Palmach soldiers into the city. After this Jewish Jerusalem was cut off from the outside world for seven weeks, with the exception of a dozen trucks which brought army supplies on 17 May.

=== Food rationing ===
Starting in early 1948, the Arab forces had severed the supply line to Jewish Jerusalem. On 31 March, Dov Yosef introduced a draconian system of food rationing. The bread ration was 200 grams per person. The April Passover week ration per person was 2 lb potatoes, 2 eggs, 0.5 lb fish, 4 lb matzoth, 1.5 oz dried fruit, 0.5 lb meat and 0.5 lb matza flour. The meat cost one Palestine pound per pound. On 12 May, water rationing was introduced. The ration was two gallons/person/day, of which four pints was drinking water. In June the weekly ration per person was 100 grams of wheat, 100 g beans, 40 g cheese, 100 g coffee or 100 g powdered milk, 160 g bread per day, 50 g margarine with one or two eggs for the sick. The mallow plant played an important role in Jerusalem history at this time. When convoys bearing foodstuffs could not reach the city, the residents of Jerusalem went out to the fields to pick mallow leaves, which are rich in iron and vitamins. The Jerusalem radio station, Kol Hamagen, broadcast instructions for cooking mallow. When the broadcasts were picked up in Jordan, they sparked victory celebrations. Radio Amman announced that the fact that the Jews were eating leaves, which was food for donkeys and cattle, was a sign that they were dying of starvation and would soon surrender.

== End of the siege and truces ==
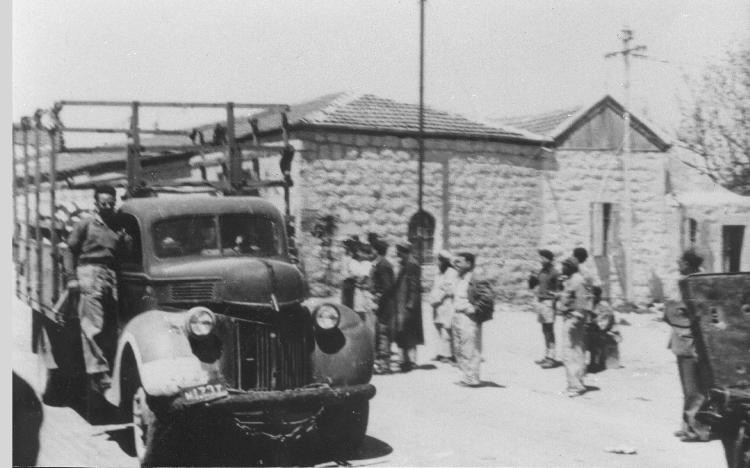
Convoy arriving in Jerusalem, 23 April 1948, Erev Pesach

On 27 March an attack on a convoy returning from the Gush Etzion settlement block south of Jerusalem left 15 Jews dead. In April, shortly after the Jewish attack on the Arab village of Deir Yassin west of Jerusalem which caused many civilian casualties, Arab forces attacked a Jewish medical convoy on its way to Hadassah Hospital on Mount Scopus. The British had provided no escort (as they had in previous months) and both they and Palmach forces were slow to intervene during the attack and help the ambushed Jews. After seven hours of fighting, the British put an end to the standoff; by then 78 Jews (mostly unarmed medical personnel) had been killed, as was one British soldier.

According to Dov Yosef the turning point of Operation Nachshon was the death of Abd al-Qadir al-Husayni on 8 April. Thirty thousand people attended his funeral at the Haram al-Sharif and subsequently the morale of his forces collapsed. The end of the siege came with the opening of the "Burma Road" in June. In Yosef's words, "by the time the first truce (11 June 1948) came it had already broken the siege." This alternative route had been conceived in April after the failure of Nachshon to secure the entrance to the road to Jerusalem at Latrun. Work started on 18 May using bulldozers and several hundred quarrymen from Jerusalem. The major problem was a very steep section at the beginning of the ascent. After two weeks some supplies came through using mules and 200 men from the Home Guard (Mishmar Ha'am) to cover the three miles which were impassable to vehicles. These men, mostly conscripts in their fifties, each carried a 45-pound load and made the trip twice a night. This effort lasted for five nights. Three weeks later, 10 June, the steepest section was opened to vehicles, though they needed assistance from tractors to get up it. By the end of June the usual nightly convoy delivered 100 tons of supplies a night. Harry Levin in his diary entry, 7 June, says that 12 tons a night were getting through and he estimated that the city needed 17 tons daily. On 28 July he notes that during the first truce, 11 June to 8 July, 8,000 truckloads arrived. This remained the sole supply route for several months until the opening of the Valor Road (Kvish Hagevurah). In late May and early June the Israelis launched several assaults on the Latrun salient but without success. During Operation Dani they launched two other attacks on Latrun, again without success and attacked several Arab villages to widen the Jerusalem corridor that was 2 km wide in the area of Latrun.

== United Nations position ==
Part of the United Nations Partition Plan for Palestine, which the Jews of Mandatory Palestine accepted and the Arabs of Mandatory Palestine and neighboring states rejected, was that Jerusalem would be a corpus separatum, under United Nations control and not part of either the proposed Arab or Jewish states. Israel argued that the partition plan regarding Jerusalem was "null and void" due to the UN's "active relinquishing of responsibility in a critical hour" when the UN did not act to protect the city. The Arabs, who had been against Jerusalem's internationalization all along, felt similarly. The appointment of Dov Yosef as "Military Governor of the Occupied Area of Jerusalem" on 2 August closed the door on the possibility of Jerusalem being internationalized.

== Associated military operations ==
- Battles of Latrun (1948)
- Operation Danny
- Operation Kedem
- Operation Nachshon
- Operation Yevusi

== Bibliography ==
=== Primary sources ===
- Yosef, Dov (1960). The Faithful City: The Siege of Jerusalem, 1948. Simon and Schuster. LCCN 60-10976. OCLC 266413.
- Levin, Harry (1997) [1950]. Jerusalem Embattled: A Diary of the City Under Siege, March 25th, 1948, to July 18th, 1948. London: Cassell. ISBN 030433765X.
- Rose, Pauline (2016) [1950]. Siege of Jerusalem: Selected Writings of Pauline Rose. First Fruits of Zion. ISBN 978-1941534168.

=== Secondary sources ===
- Carlson, John Roy (1951). From Cairo to Damascus. New York: Alfred A. Knopf.
- Collins, Larry; LaPierre, Dominique (1972). O Jerusalem. New York: Simon and Schuster.
- Gold, Dore (2004). Tower of Babble: How the United Nations Has Fueled Global Chaos. New York: Three Rivers Press.
- Kimche, Jon; Kimche, David (1960). A Clash of Destinies. The Arab-Jewish War and the Founding of the State of Israel. Frederick A. Praeger. LCCN 60-6996. OCLC 1348948.
- Levenberg, Haim (1993). Military Preparations of the Arab Community in Palestine: 1945–1948. London: Routledge.
- Levi, Yitzhak (1986). Nine Measures: The Battles for Jerusalem in the War of Independence (in Hebrew). Ma'arachot.
- Morris, Benny (2008). 1948: The History of the First Arab-Israeli War. New Haven: Yale University Press. ISBN 9780300126969.
