= Baruch Kamin =

Israeli politician (1914–1988)

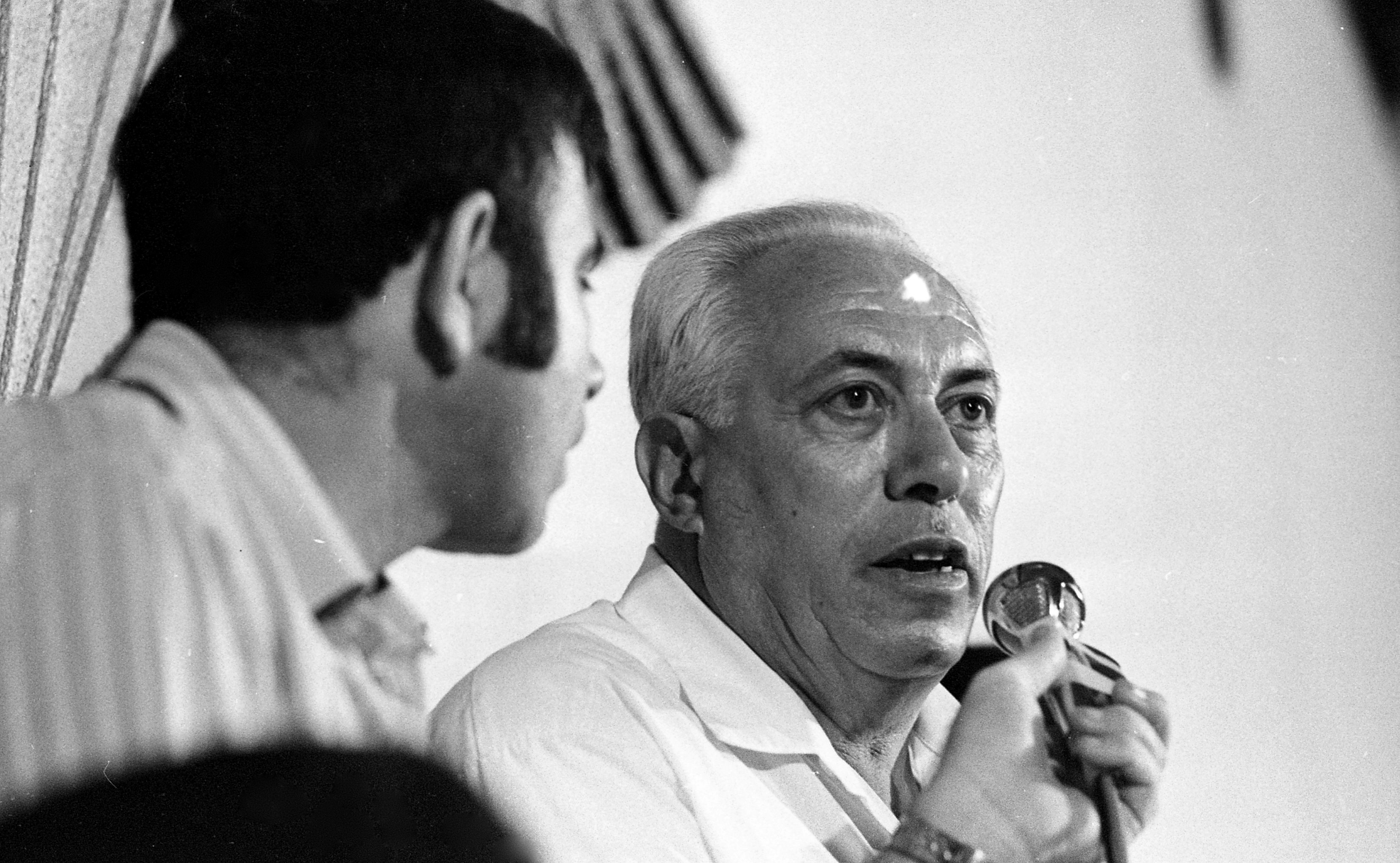
- Kamin in 1969

Faction represented in the Knesset
- 1953–1955: Mapai

Personal details
- Born: 15 April 1914 Akkerman, Russian Empire
- Died: 10 July 1988 (aged 74)

Baruch Kamin (Hebrew: ברוך קמין; 15 April 1914 – 10 July 1988) was an Israeli politician who served as a member of the Knesset for Mapai from 1953 until 1955.

== Biography ==
Born in Akkerman, Bessarabia in the Russian Empire (today Bilhorod-Dnistrovskyi in Ukraine), Kamin attended university in Chişinău, where he studied agronomy. He also became one of the leaders of the Romanian branch of the Gordonia youth movement.

He made aliyah to Mandatory Palestine in 1939, and joined kibbutz Nir Am. In 1944 he returned to Romania as a paratrooper emissary, and between 1945 and 1946 served as an emissary for the Bricha operation helping Holocaust survivors leave Europe for Mandate Palestine. In 1948 and 1949 he worked as an emissary in Czechoslovakia and Austria.

For the 1951 elections he was given a place on the Mapai list, but failed to win a seat. However, he entered the Knesset on 1 December 1953 as a replacement for David Hacohen. He lost his seat in the 1955 elections

The following year he became secretary of Herzliya Workers Council, a position he held until 1964. He also served as director of the Histadrut's culture department. Between 1964 and 1965 he travelled to the United States as an emissary.

In 1969 he left the Labor Party (which Mapai had merged into the previous year) and joined the Independent Liberals. He rejoined the Labor Party in 1981. He died in 1988 at the age of 74.
