= Haim Ariav =

Israeli politician (1895–1957)

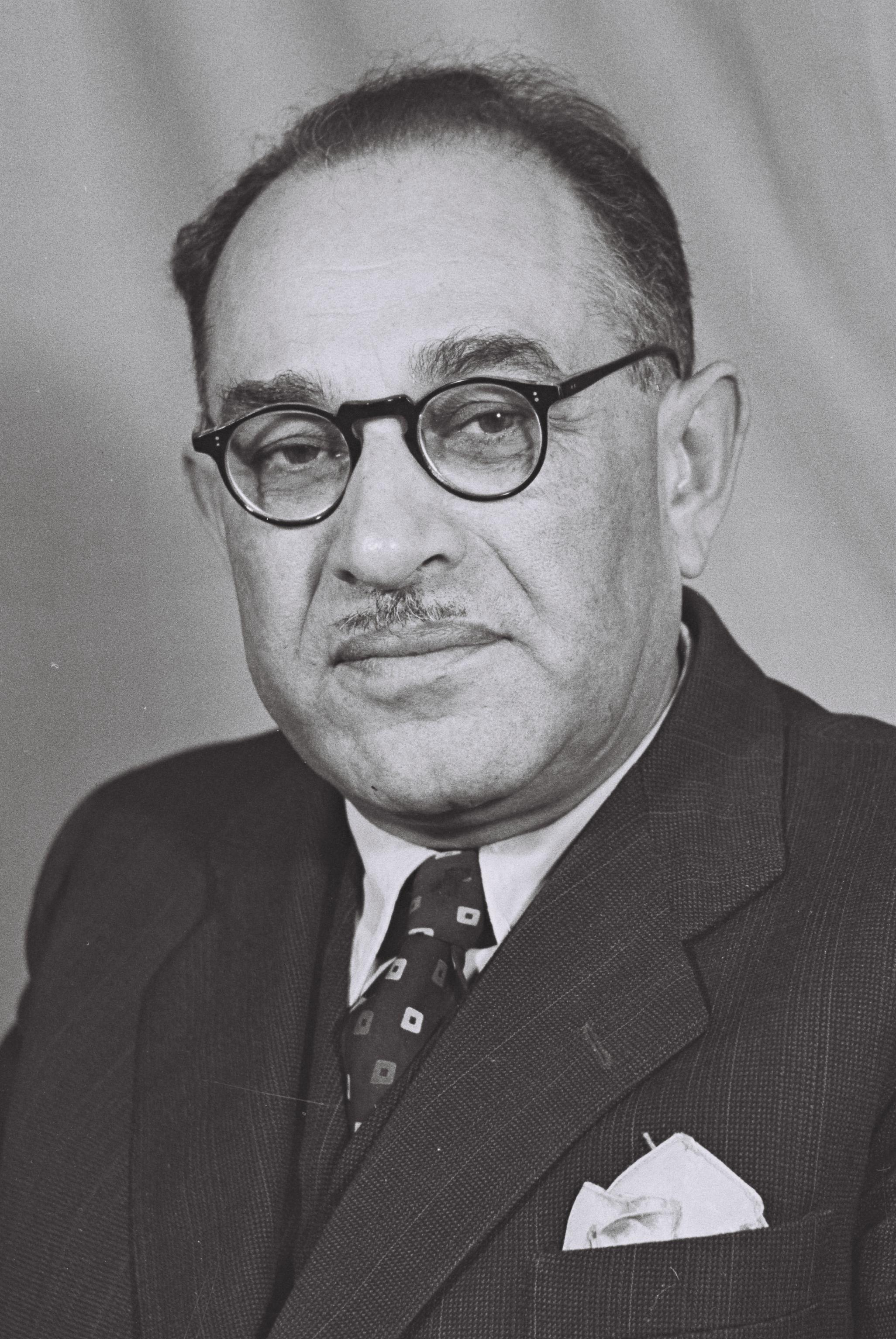
- Ariav in 1959

Faction represented in the Knesset
- 1951–1957: General Zionists

Personal details
- Born: 1895 Lida, Russian Empire
- Died: 16 June 1957 (aged 61–62) Tel Aviv, Israel

Haim Ariav (Hebrew: חיים אריאב; 1895 – 16 June 1957) was an Israeli politician who served as a member of the Knesset for the General Zionists between 1951 and 1957.

== Biography ==
Born Haim Krupski in Lida in the Vilna Governorate of the Russian Empire (present-day Grodno Region, Belarus), Ariav was educated in a heder and a Russian primary school. He emigrated to Ottoman-controlled Palestine in 1912 and finished his secondary education at the Herzliya Hebrew High School. He went on to study jurisprudence at the Jerusalem Jurisprudence School, and was certified as a lawyer.

He volunteered for the Ottoman Army and attended officers training school in Istanbul. He later taught at a military school in Damascus and worked as a translator. After the Nili group was discovered, Ariav was arrested and sent to Istanbul, though he was later released and sent to the Caucasus front to be an officer and translator.

After the war he worked in the secretariat of the Delegates Committee, and became its general secretary. In 1929 he was appointed general secretary of the Jerusalem branch of the Jewish Agency, where he worked until 1931. A secretary of the Hitahdut HaIkarim, in 1934 he founded the Society for Local Councils, and assisted in the establishment of Pardes Hanna Agricultural High School. He was also amongst the founders and directors of the HaBoker newspaper.

A member of the executive committee of the Union of General Zionists, Ariav was elected to the Knesset in 1951 on the General Zionists' list. He was re-elected in 1955, and died in 1957 whilst still serving as an MK. His seat was taken by Ya'akov Klivnov.
