= Ya'akov Klivnov =

Israeli politician

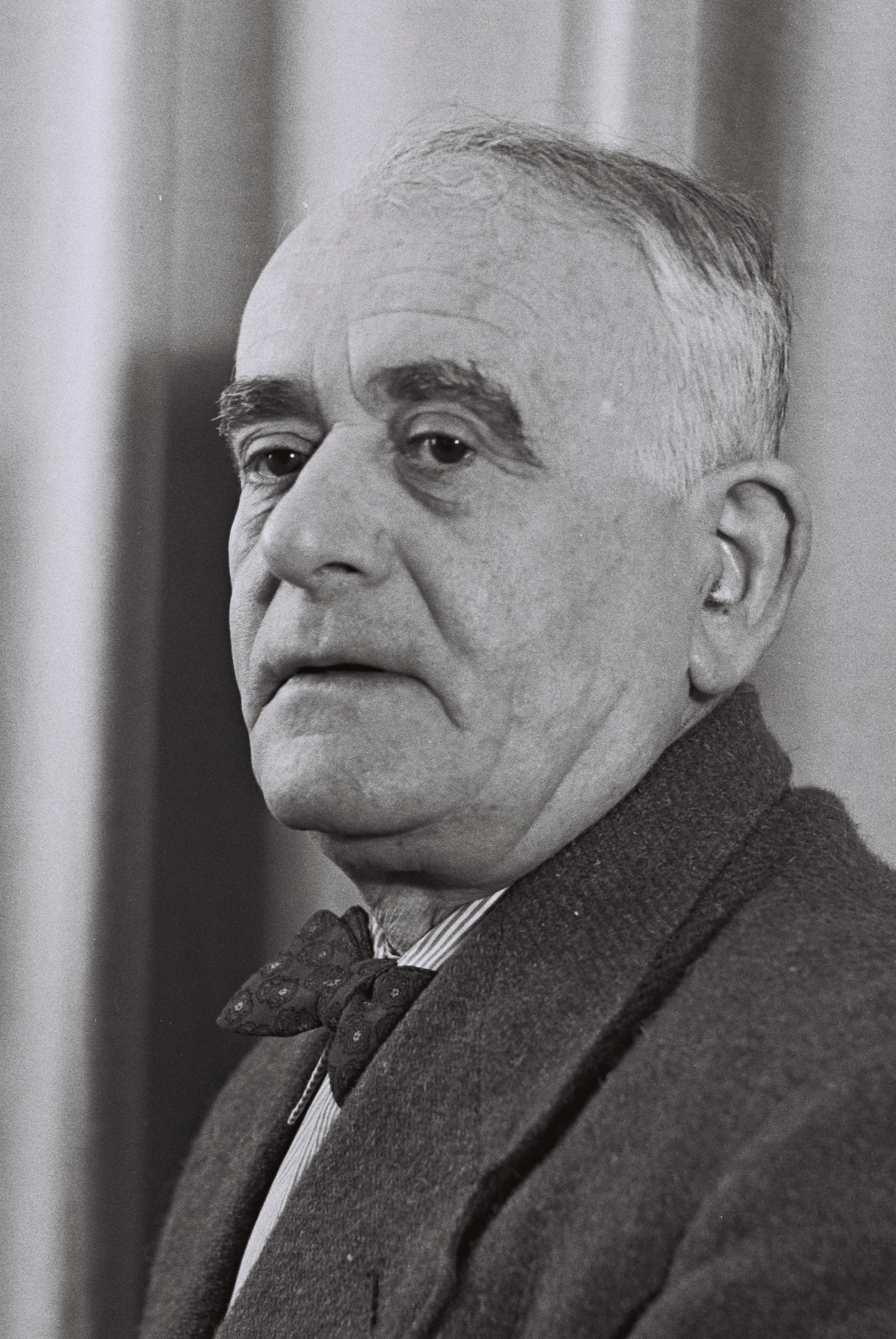
- Klivnov in 1951

Faction represented in the Knesset
- 1949–1955: General Zionists
- 1955–1957: General Zionists

Personal details
- Born: 20 December 1887 Khalopenichy, Russian Empire
- Died: 11 April 1966 (aged 78)

Ya'akov Klivnov (Hebrew: יעקב קליבנוב; 20 December 1887 – 11 April 1966) was an Israeli politician who served as a member of the Knesset for the General Zionists from 1949 until 1955, and again from 1955 until 1957.

== Biography ==
Born in Khalopenichy, Minsk Governorate in the Russian Empire (in present-day Belarus), Klivnov attended high school in Ukraine before studying law at the University of Petersburg, where he was certified as a lawyer in 1912. He was a member of the Zionist youth group HaTehiya between 1905 and 1910, and between 1907 and 1920 he edited a Russian newspaper. From 1913 until 1917 he served as secretary of the Zionist Federation in Russia, attended Zionist congresses, and was also a member of the Devotees of the Hebrew Language group.

He emigrated to Mandatory Palestine in 1921. He was a member of the Community Committee in Haifa, and was amongst the founders of Kiryat Motzkin in 1934.

In the first Knesset elections in 1949, he was elected on the General Zionists list. He was re-elected in 1951, but lost his seat in the 1955 elections. However, he re-entered the Knesset on 16 June 1957 as a replacement for the deceased Haim Ariav. He lost his seat in the 1959 elections and died in 1966.
