= Eliyahu Hacarmeli =

Israeli politician (1891-1952)

- אֵלִיָּהוּ הַכַּרְמֶלִּי
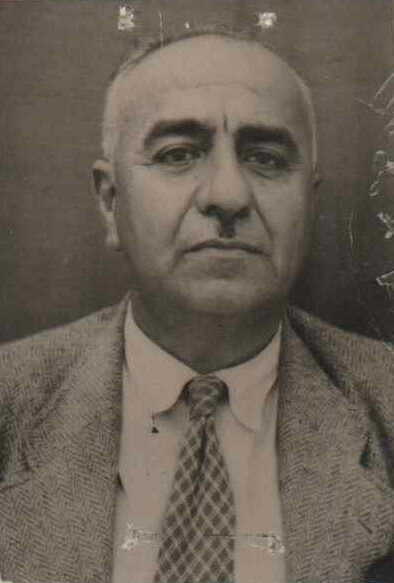

Faction represented in the Knesset
- 1949–1952: Mapai

Personal details
- Born: 1 August 1891 Haifa, Ottoman Empire
- Died: 21 December 1952 (aged 61)

Eliyahu Hacarmeli (Hebrew: אֵלִיָּהוּ הַכַּרְמֶלִּי; 1 August 1891 – 21 December 1952) was an Israeli politician who served as a member of the Knesset from 1949 until 1952.

== Biography ==
Born Eliyahu Lulu in Haifa during the Ottoman era, Hacarmeli was educated at an Alliance School in his home city, before studying at an Alliance Teachers Seminary in Paris. Between 1920 and 1930 he worked as a teacher in the north of the country, and was chairman of the Southern Galilee branch of the Teachers Union.

A member of Hapoel Hatzair, he served as a member of the Assembly of Representatives on its behalf between 1925 and 1931, as well as being a deputy member of the Jewish National Council.

In 1930 he moved to Jerusalem, where he became a Mapai activist, having previously been a member of Hapoel Hatzair. He also worked as an emissary to Morocco and Tunisia. In 1949 he was elected to the first Knesset on the Mapai list, and was re-elected in 1951. He died whilst still a Knesset member in 1952; his seat was taken by Shlomo Hillel.
