= Reuven Feldman =

Israeli politician (1899–1990)

- ראובן פלדמן
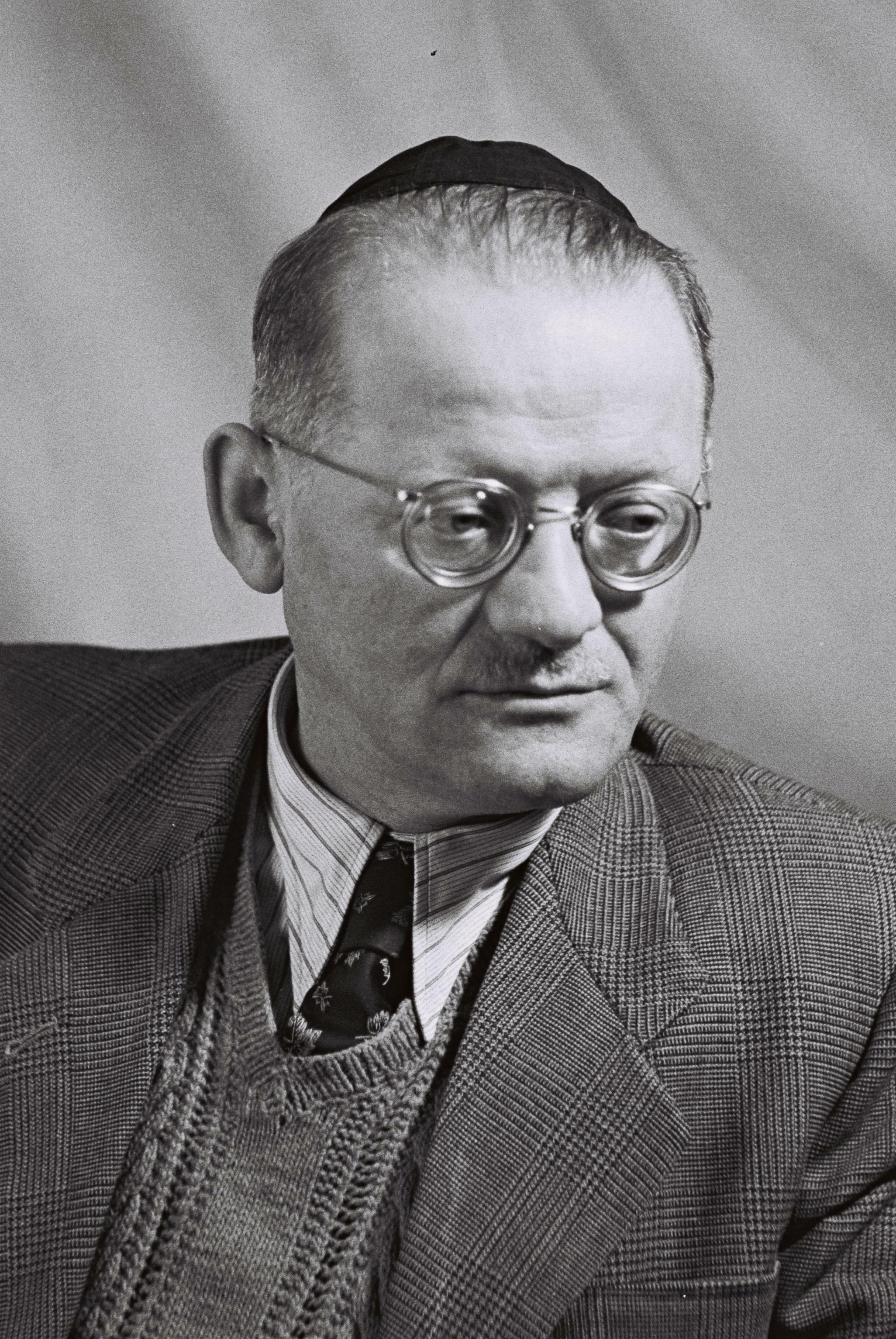
- Feldman in 1951

Faction represented in the Knesset
- 1951–1955: Mapai

Personal details
- Born: 29 December 1899; Kraków, Austria-Hungary
- Died: 7 April 1990 (aged 90)

Reuven Feldman (Hebrew: ראובן פלדמן; 29 December 1899 – 7 April 1990) was an Israeli politician who served as a member of the Knesset for Mapai between 1951 and 1955.

== Biography ==
Born in Kraków in Austria-Hungary (today in Poland), Feldman was educated at a yeshiva, and later studied at the Institute for Commerce and Economics Studies in Kraków, and was certified as a rabbi. In 1920 he joined the Hapoel Hatzair Tzeiri Zion federation. He also served as chairman of the local branch of Tarbut.

In 1933 he made aliyah to Mandatory Palestine, where he became chairman of the Kraków Immigrants Association. He also served as general secretary of the National Committee of Grocery Stores, and in 1951 became general secretary of the Union of Israeli Merchants. In the same year he was elected to the Knesset on the Mapai list, though he lost his seat in the 1955 elections. He also chaired the Federation of Grocery Store Owners.

He died in 1990 at the age of 90.
