= Reuven Shari =

Israeli politician (1903–1989)

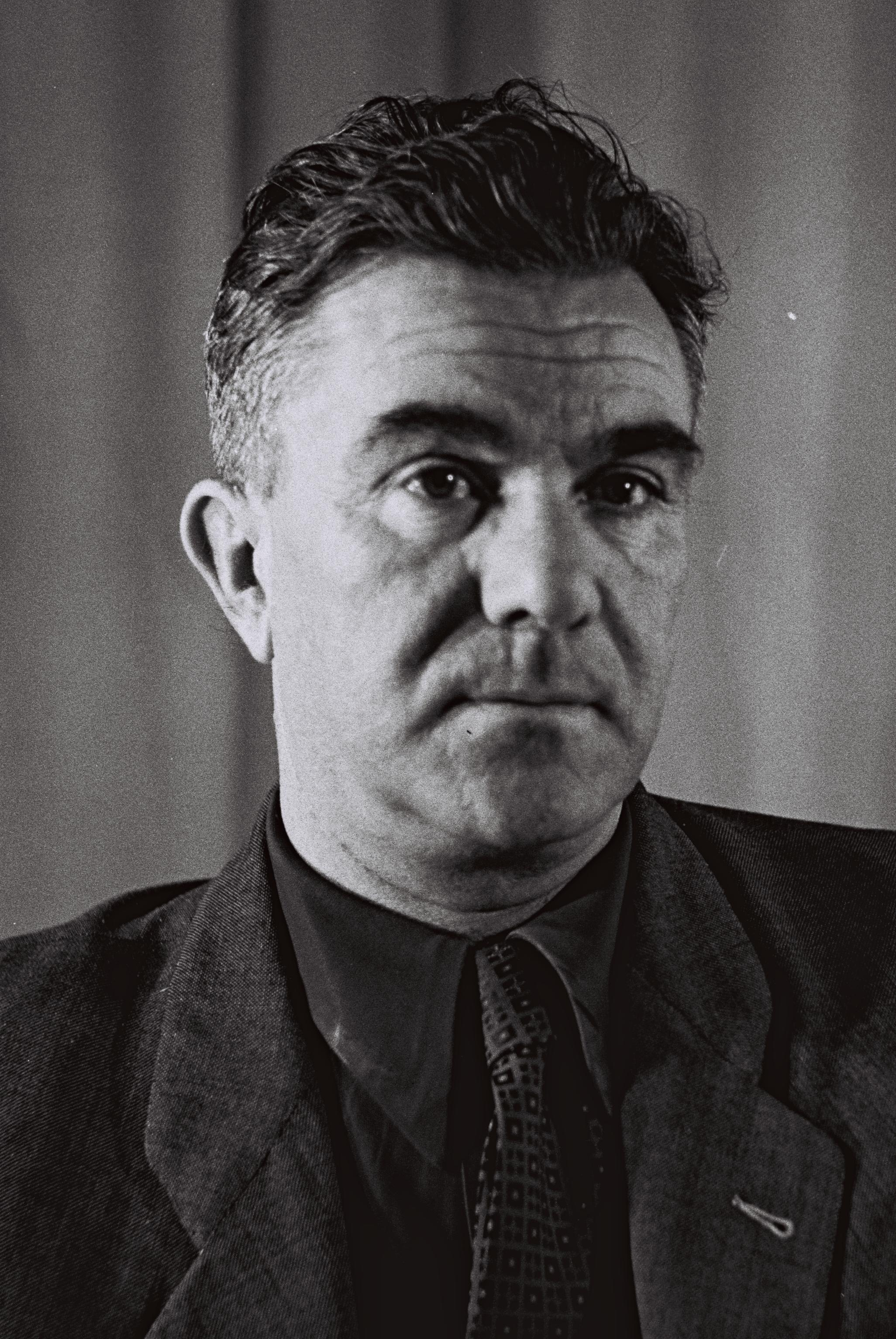

Faction represented in the Knesset
- 1949–1955: Mapai

Personal details
- Born: 7 April 1903 Comrat, Russian Empire
- Died: 6 July 1989 (aged 86)

Reuven Shari (Hebrew: ראובן שרי; 7 April 1903 – 6 July 1989) was a Russian-born Israeli politician who served in the Knesset from 1949 to 1955, and was active in the local politics of Jerusalem.

== Early life and education ==
Reuven Shari was born in Comrat, on 7 April 1903. He received a Jewish education in Gagauzia, graduated from a gymnasium in Chișinău, and studied law at the University of Iași. He was a member of the Tze'irei Zion movement. He immigrated to Mandatory Palestine in 1925.

== Career ==
Shari joined the Haganah during the 1929 Palestine riots. Shari was one of the organisers of picketing in Kfar Saba in 1934, and opposed Arab labor as an "invasion".

The British High Commissioner appointed Auster as deputy mayor of Jerusalem in 1935. The government of Mandatory Palestine established two governments for Jerusalem in 1948, one for Arabs and the other for Jews. Daniel Auster was made mayor in 1948, with Shari as his deputy mayor. He was a member of the Jerusalem City Council in 1948, and from 1956 to 1958.

Shari served in the 1st and 2nd sessions of the Knesset as a member of Mapai. During his tenure he served on the Labor and Public Services committees. He was Deputy Minister of Transportation in David Ben-Gurion's government in 1951.

Shari also served as Israel's civil service commissioner. He was chief supervisor of labor relations at the Ministry of Labor from 1957 to 1968.

== Personal life ==
In 1984, Shari received the Yakir Yerushalayim (Worthy Citizen of Jerusalem) award from the city of Jerusalem.

Shari died on 6 July 1989, and was buried in the Mount of Olives.

== Works cited ==
=== Journals ===
- Glazer, Steven (2007). "Language of Propaganda: The Histadrut, Hebrew Labor, and the Palestinian Worker". Journal of Palestine Studies. 36 (2). Institute for Palestine Studies: 25–38. doi:10.2307/jps.2007.36.2.25. JSTOR jps.2007.36.2.25.
- Weitz, Yechiam (2022). "Municipal Elections in the Holy City: Campaigns, Results, and Coalition Building in Jerusalem, 1948–1973". Israel Studies. 27 (3). Indiana University Press: 143–165. doi:10.2307/48683547. JSTOR 48683547.

=== News ===
- Doks, Edward (7 November 2024). "Gagauzia's stunning scenery and hospitality and its few remaining Jews". Yedioth Ahronoth. Archived from the original on 6 November 2026.

=== Web ===
- ראובן שרי (שרייבמן) [Reuven Sherry (Shreivman)] (in Hebrew). Knesset.
