= Ya'akov Uri =

Israeli politician (1888-1970)

- יעקב אורי
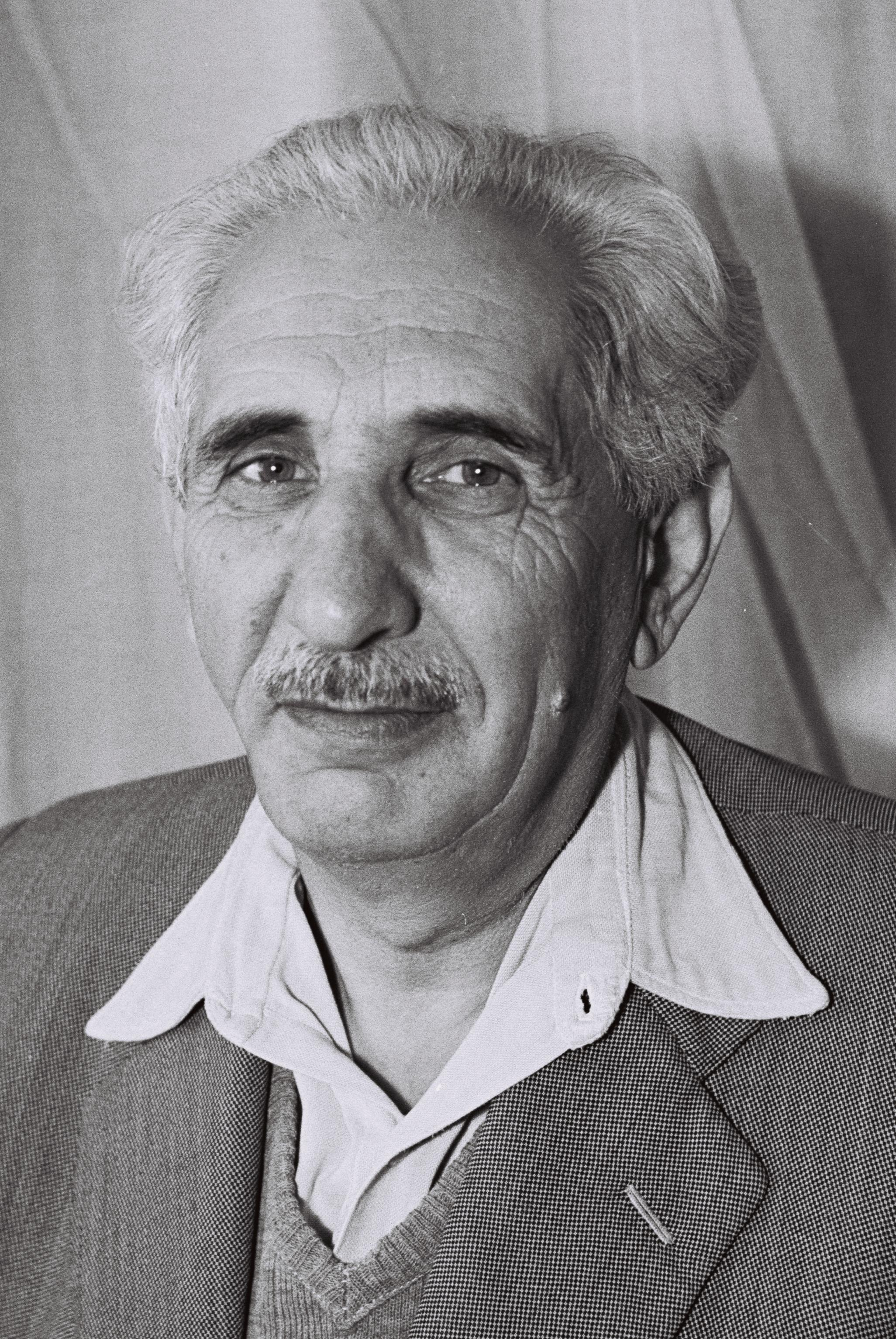
- Uri in 1951

Faction represented in the Knesset
- 1951–1955: Mapai

Personal details
- Born: 3 March 1888 Russian Empire
- Died: 26 July 1970 (aged 82)

Ya'akov Uri (Hebrew: יעקב אורי; 3 March 1888 – 26 July 1970) was an Israeli politician who served as a member of the Knesset for Mapai between 1951 and 1955.

== Biography ==
Born in the Poltava Oblast in the Russian Empire (today in Ukraine), Uri was educated at a yeshiva, and made aliyah to Ottoman-controlled Palestine in 1910. A member of Hapoel Hatzair, he was amongst the founders of Nahalal, the first moshav, and the Moshavim Movement, for whom he edited the monthly publication Talamim.

A member of Mapai, he was a delegate to the Assembly of Representatives. In 1951, he was elected to the Knesset on the Mapai list, but lost his seat in the 1955 elections.

He died in 1970 at the age of 82, and was buried in Nahalal Cemetery.
