= Yehezkel Hen =

Israeli politician (1882–1952)

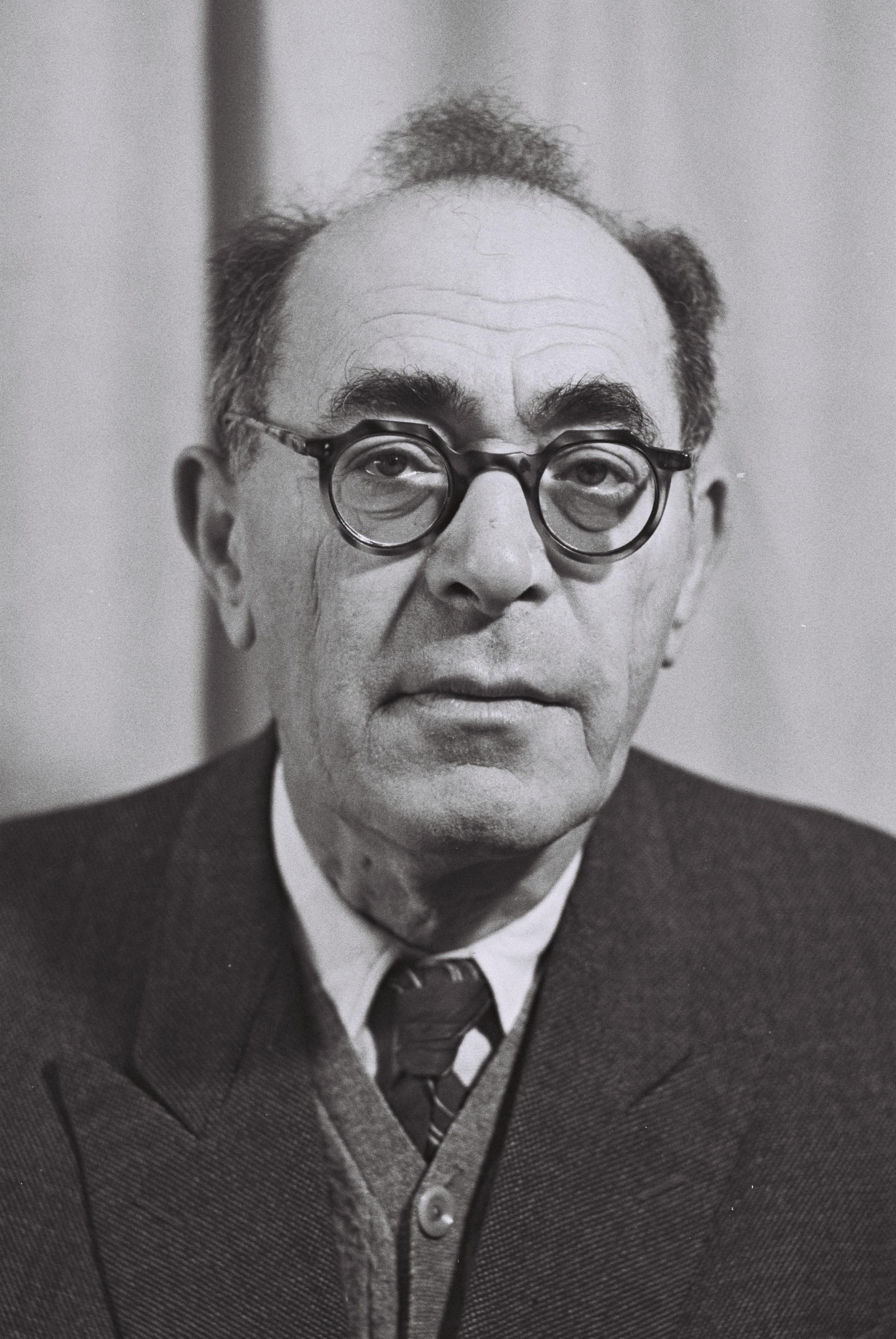
- Hen in 1951

Faction represented in the Knesset
- 1951–1952: Mapai

Personal details
- Born: 1882 Boryslav, Austria-Hungary
- Died: 4 April 1952 (aged 69–70)

Yehezkel Hen (Hebrew: יחזקאל הן; 1882 – 4 April 1952) was an Israeli politician who served as a member of the Knesset for Mapai between 1951 and 1952.

== Biography ==
Born in Boryslav in Austria-Hungary (today in Ukraine), Hen received a religious education, before studying at a Teachers' Seminary in Kiev. He taught Hebrew in Jewish schools until they were shut down by the Yevsektsiya. He emigrated to Mandatory Palestine in 1925, where he worked as a teacher and a supervisor for the Histadrut's educational institutions. He also taught at the Levinsky Teachers Seminary in Tel Aviv.

Between 1944 and 1948 he was a member of the Assembly of Representatives for Mapai, and in 1951 he was elected to the Knesset on the Mapai list. However, he died on 4 April the following year while still an MK. His seat was taken by Rachel Tzabari.
