= Simha Tzabari =

Israeli politician (1913–2004)

- שמחה צברי

Personal details
- Born: 1913 Tel Aviv, Ottoman Empire
- Died: 2004 (aged 90–91)
- Party: Palestine Communist Party; Mapam
- Occupation: Teacher

Simha Tzabari (Hebrew: שמחה צברי; 1913–2004) was an Israeli politician who served as a member of the central committee of the Palestine Communist Party.

== Early life and education ==
Tzabari was born in Tel Aviv in 1913, and her parents were Yemenite Jewish workers. She had five siblings, including Rahel. She attended Yehieli Girls School in the Neve Tzedek neighborhood of Tel Aviv. During her studies she became a revolutionary and was trained at the Communist University of the Toilers of the East in Moscow in the early 1930s. At age 21 she became a member of the central committee of the Palestinian Communist Party.

== Career and activities ==
Tzabari worked at a factory and was a member of the Communist Youth League. She launched the Jewish branch of the Palestine Communist Party to organize activities in the cities of Jerusalem, Haifa, and Tel Aviv. However, it was closed in 1939 due to the conflicts between the group and the leadership of the party. In the 1940s she continued to be one of the leading members of the party. Following the establishment of Israel in 1948 she joined the leftist political party Mapam. She retired from politics in 1954 and attended a high school obtaining a diploma. She worked as a teacher of Arabic at a school in Ramla.

== Personal life and death ==
Tzabari did not get married and had no children. She had an affair with Radwan Al Hilu, general secretary of the Palestine Communist Party.

She was diagnosed with Alzheimer's disease in 2002 and died in October 2004.
