= Avraham Kalfon =

Israeli politician

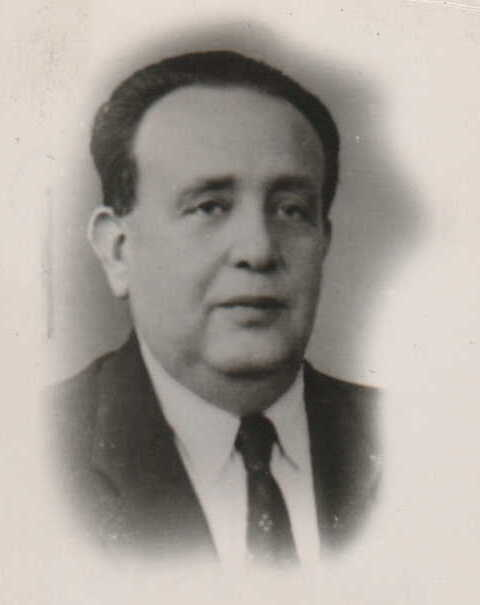
- Kalfon in the 1950s

Faction represented in the Knesset
- 1951–1955: Mapai

Personal details
- Born: 16 December 1900 Tiberias, Ottoman Empire
- Died: 4 July 1983 (aged 82)

Avraham Kalfon (Hebrew: אברהם כלפון; born 16 December 1900, died 4 July 1983) was an Israeli politician who served as a member of the Knesset for Mapai between 1952 and 1955.

== Biography ==
Born in Tiberias during the Ottoman era, Kalfon was educated at an Alliance school and the Hebrew Reali School in Haifa. In 1919 he became secretary of the Jewish community in the city, serving until 1923, when he became a member of its committee. He was also amongst the founders of the Tehiya association to promote the Hebrew language.

In 1924, he was appointed director of the Organisation Department of the Histadrut's Executive Committee and also managed a Histadrut club for Arab workers. In 1926, he helped establish the Bialik Technical and Trade High School, serving on its board until 1935. In 1927, he became chairman of the Haifa Sephardi Committee, a position he held until 1983.

A member of Mapai, he was on the party's list for the 1951 elections, but failed to win a seat. However, he entered the Knesset on 13 July 1952 as a replacement for the deceased Eliezer Kaplan. He lost his seat in the 1955 elections and began working as a Hebrew teacher at the Reali school.

In 1958, he was appointed head of the Interior Ministry, where he worked until 1966. He also served as chairman of District Committee of the Department for Emergency Supplies. He died in 1983 at the age of 82.
