= Nahum Het =

Israeli politician (1896–1990)

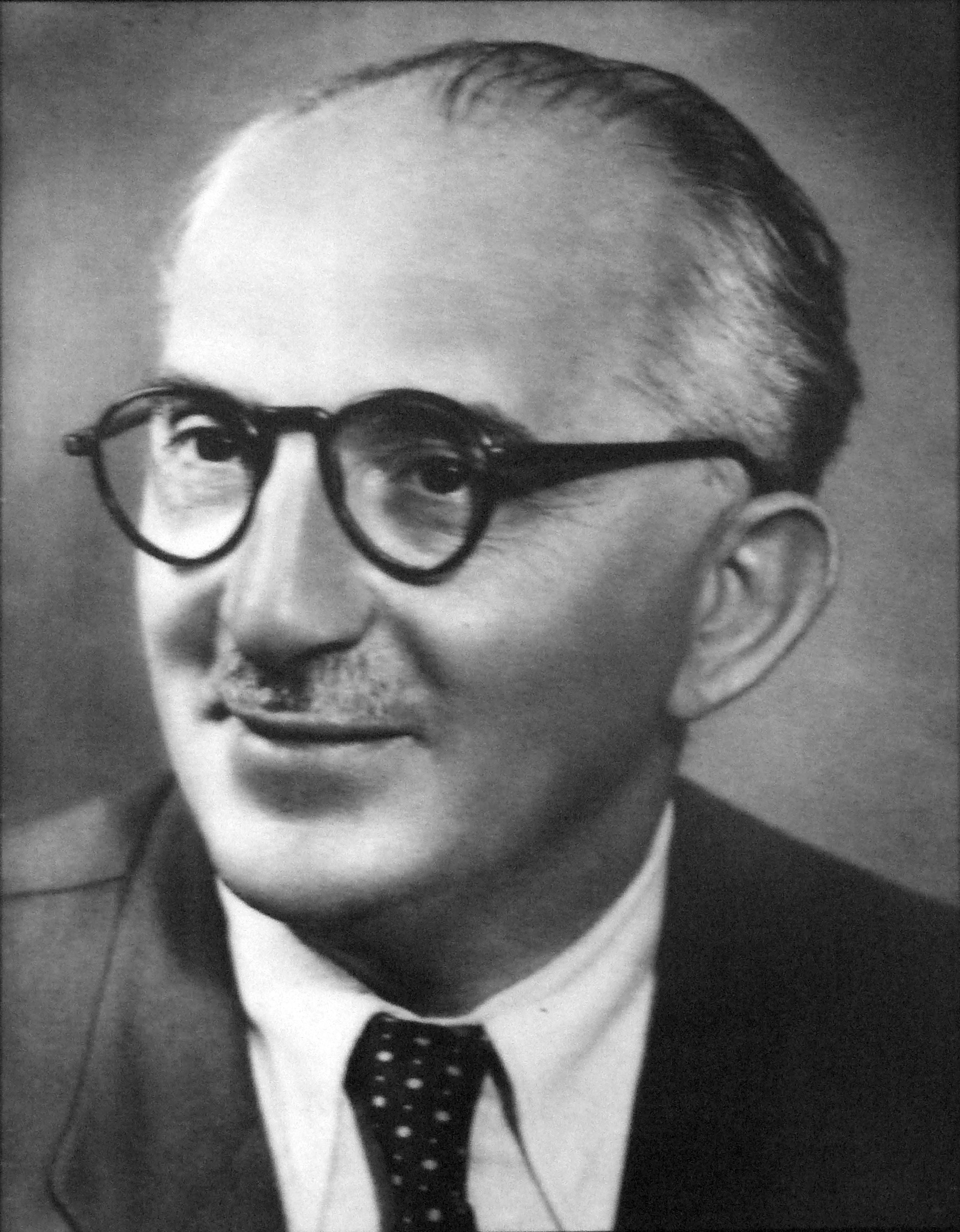
- Het in the 1950s

Faction represented in the Knesset
- 1951–1955: General Zionists

Personal details
- Born: 1896 Odessa, Russian Empire
- Died: 15 January 1990 (aged 93–94)

Nahum Het (Hebrew: נחום חת; 1896 – 15 January 1990) was an Israeli politician who served as a member of the Knesset for the General Zionists between 1951 and 1955.

== Biography ==
Nahum Het was born in Odessa in the Russian Empire (today in Ukraine). He attended heder and a gymnasium before attending Odessa University. In 1917 he joined Tzeiri Zion, and became deputy chairman of the All Russia Maccabi central committee. He was a member of the Jewish self-defense organisation in Odessa. In 1919 he emigrated to Palestine and settled in Haifa the following year. He later studied law at the Jerusalem Law School, and was certified as a lawyer.

In 1935 he became chairman of the Maccabi central committee, serving until 1939. Between 1944 and 1948 he was a member of the Jewish National Council. From 1947 until 1948 he was a legal advisor to the Haganah's supreme command, and following independence, worked for the Ministry of Defense. In 1949 he became chairman of the Haifa branch of the General Zionists, and was also a member of Haifa city council. He was placed 17th on the General Zionists list for the 1951 Knesset elections, and was elected as they won 20 seats. He was 15th on the party's list for the 1955 elections, losing his seat as the party was reduced to 13 seats. Also in 1951 he became president of Israel's Olympic committee, a position he held until 1956. In 1957 he became president of the World Maccabi Federation.

Het died in 1990.
