= Rachel Tzabari =

Israeli politician (1909–1995)

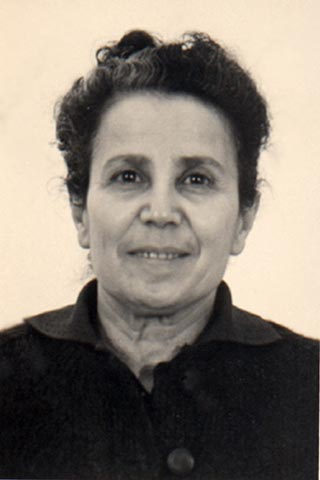

Faction represented in the Knesset
- 1952–1965: Mapai
- 1965–1968: Alignment
- 1968–1969: Labor Party
- 1969: Alignment

Personal details
- Born: 27 July 1909 Tel Aviv, Ottoman Empire
- Died: 16 February 1995 (aged 85)

Rachel Tzabari (Hebrew: רחל צברי; 27 July 1909 – 16 February 1995) was an Israeli politician who served as a member of the Knesset for Mapai and its successors between 1952 and 1969.

== Biography ==
Born in Tel Aviv during the Ottoman era to Jewish parents who immigrated from Yemen, Tzabari was educated at a girls' school in Neve Tzedek, before studying at a Teachers Seminary in Tel Aviv and at the Hebrew University of Jerusalem. She had five siblings, including Simha. She worked as a teacher, and taught at the model schools in Tel Aviv and Jerusalem. She also lectured at the Teachers Seminary at Beit HaKerem, and was a schools supervisor in Jerusalem.

A member of the Haganah prior to independence, Tzabari was on the Mapai list for the 1951 elections, but failed to win a seat. However, she entered the Knesset on 4 April 1952 as a replacement for the deceased Yehezkel Hen. She retained her seat in elections in 1955, 1959, 1961 and 1965, by which time Mapai had formed the Alignment. She lost her seat in the 1969 elections.

She died in 1995 at the age of 85.
