= List of members of the fourth Knesset =

The 120 members of the fourth Knesset were elected on 3 November 1959. The breakdown by party was as follows:

- Mapai: 47
- Herut: 17
- National Religious Party: 12
- Mapam: 9
- General Zionists: 8
- Ahdut HaAvoda: 7
- Religious Torah Front: 6
- Progressive Party: 6
- Maki: 3
- Progress and Development: 2
- Cooperation and Brotherhood: 2
- Agriculture and Development: 1

== List of members ==
Member	Party	Notes
Yosef Almogi	Mapai	
Zalman Aran	Mapai	
Meir Argov	Mapai	
Ami Assaf	Mapai	
David Bar-Rav-Hai	Mapai	
Moshe Baram	Mapai	
Aharon Becker	Mapai	
David Ben-Gurion	Mapai	
Gideon Ben-Yisrael	Mapai	
Herzl Berger	Mapai	
Menachem Cohen	Mapai	
Yitzhak Coren	Mapai	
Moshe Dayan	Mapai	
Amos Degani	Mapai	
Abba Eban	Mapai	
Yosef Efrati	Mapai	
Levi Eshkol	Mapai	
Yosef Fischer	Mapai	
Akiva Govrin	Mapai	
Yisrael Guri	Mapai	
David Hacohen	Mapai	
Asher Hassin	Mapai	
Avraham Herzfeld	Mapai	
Beba Idelson	Mapai	
Yisrael Kargman	Mapai	
Yona Kesse	Mapai	
Hannah Lamdan	Mapai	
Pinhas Lavon	Mapai	
Kadish Luz	Mapai	
Golda Meir	Mapai	
Mordechai Namir	Mapai	
Dvora Netzer	Mapai	
Baruch Osnia	Mapai	
Shimon Peres	Mapai	
David Petel	Mapai	
Pinhas Sapir	Mapai	
Moshe Sardines	Mapai	
Moshe Sharett	Mapai	
Bechor-Shalom Sheetrit	Mapai	
Shmuel Shoresh	Mapai	
Yizhar Smilansky	Mapai	
Rachel Tzabari	Mapai	
Jenia Tversky	Mapai	
Yisrael Yeshayahu	Mapai	
Giora Yoseftal	Mapai	
Haim Yosef Zadok	Mapai	
Mordechai Zar	Mapai	
Aryeh Altman	Herut	
Binyamin Arditi	Herut	
Binyamin Avniel	Herut	
Yohanan Bader	Herut	
Menachem Begin	Herut	
Aryeh Ben-Eliezer	Herut	
Haim Cohen-Meguri	Herut	
Haim Landau	Herut	
Nahum Levin	Herut	
Eliyahu Meridor	Herut	
Ya'akov Meridor	Herut	
Mordechai Olmert	Herut	
Esther Raziel-Naor	Herut	
Shabtai Shikhman	Herut	
Yosef Shofman	Herut	
Eliezer Shostak	Herut	
Shimshon Unichman	Herut	
Shlomo-Yisrael Ben-Meir	National Religious Party	
Yosef Burg	National Religious Party	
Michael Hasani	National Religious Party	
Aharon-Ya'akov Greenberg	National Religious Party	
Mordechai Nurock	National Religious Party	
Yitzhak Rafael	National Religious Party	
Tova Sanhadray	National Religious Party	
Binyamin Shahor	National Religious Party	
Haim-Moshe Shapira	National Religious Party	
Moshe Unna	National Religious Party	
Zerach Warhaftig	National Religious Party	
Frija Zoaretz	National Religious Party	
Yisrael Barzilai	Mapam	
Mordechai Bentov	Mapam	
Ya'akov Hazan	Mapam	
Yussuf Hamis	Mapam	
Ya'akov Riftin	Mapam	
Hanan Rubin	Mapam	
Emma Talmi	Mapam	
Meir Ya'ari	Mapam	
Haim Yehuda	Mapam	
Zalman Abramov	General Zionists	Party merged into the Liberal Party
Peretz Bernstein	General Zionists	Party merged into the Liberal Party
Ezra Ichilov	General Zionists	Party merged into the Liberal Party
Moshe Nissim	General Zionists	Party merged into the Liberal Party
Elimelekh Rimalt	General Zionists	Party merged into the Liberal Party
Yosef Sapir	General Zionists	Party merged into the Liberal Party
Yosef Serlin	General Zionists	Party merged into the Liberal Party
Zvi Zimmerman	General Zionists	Party merged into the Liberal Party
Yigal Allon	Ahdut HaAvoda	
Yisrael Bar-Yehuda	Ahdut HaAvoda	
Yitzhak Ben-Aharon	Ahdut HaAvoda	
Mordechai Bibi	Ahdut HaAvoda	
Moshe Carmel	Ahdut HaAvoda	
Yisrael Galili	Ahdut HaAvoda	
Nahum Nir	Ahdut HaAvoda	
Kalman Kahana	Religious Torah Front	When alliance split, represented Poalei Agudat Yisrael
Ya'akov Katz	Religious Torah Front	When alliance split, represented Poalei Agudat Yisrael
Yitzhak-Meir Levin	Religious Torah Front	When alliance split, represented Agudat Yisrael
Shlomo Lorincz	Religious Torah Front	When alliance split, represented Agudat Yisrael
Binyamin Mintz	Religious Torah Front	When alliance split, represented Poalei Agudat Yisrael
Menachem Porush	Religious Torah Front	When alliance split, represented Agudat Yisrael
Idov Cohen	Progressive Party	Party merged into the Liberal Party
Yitzhak Golan	Progressive Party	Party merged into the Liberal Party
Yizhar Harari	Progressive Party	Party merged into the Liberal Party
Shimon Kanovitch	Progressive Party	Party merged into the Liberal Party
Moshe Kol	Progressive Party	Party merged into the Liberal Party
Pinhas Rosen	Progressive Party	Party merged into the Liberal Party
Shmuel Mikunis	Maki	
Tawfik Toubi	Maki	
Meir Vilner	Maki	
Ahmed A-Dahar	Progress and Development	
Elias Nakhleh	Progress and Development	
Labib Hussein Abu Rokan	Cooperation and Brotherhood	
Yussef Diab	Cooperation and Brotherhood	
Mahmud A-Nashaf	Agriculture and Development	

=== Replacements ===
MK	Replaced	Party	Date	Notes
Moshe Sneh	Meir Vilner	Maki	16 December 1959	
Aharon Yadlin	Aharon Becker	Mapai	23 May 1960	
Yosef Kushnir	Haim Yehuda	Mapam	10 July 1960	
Ruth Haktin	Yigal Allon	Ahdut HaAvoda	25 October 1960	
Avraham Drori	Shimshon Unichman	Herut	21 March 1961	
Shlomo-Ya'akov Gross	Binyamin Mintz	Agudat Yisrael	30 May 1961	
