= List of members of the seventh Knesset =

The 120 members of the seventh Knesset were elected on 28 October 1969. The breakdown by party was as follows:

- Alignment: 56
- Gahal: 26
- National Religious Party: 12
- Agudat Yisrael: 4
- Independent Liberals: 4
- National List: 4
- Rakah: 3
- Progress and Development: 2
- Poalei Agudat Yisrael: 2
- Cooperation and Brotherhood: 2
- HaOlam HaZeh – Koah Hadash: 2
- Free Centre: 2
- Maki: 1

== List of members ==
Party	Member	Notes
Alignment	Aharon Becker	
Alignment	Eliyahu Sasson	
Alignment	Ze'ev Sherf	
Alignment	Ya'akov Shimshon Shapira	
Alignment	Yitzhak Ben-Aharon	
Alignment	Mordechai Ben-Porat	
Alignment	Mordechai Bibi	
Alignment	Shimon Peres	
Alignment	Mordechai Ofer	
Alignment	Dov Zakin	
Alignment	Pinchas Sapir	
Alignment	Avraham Ofer	
Alignment	Yitzhak Navon	
Alignment	Moshe Dayan	
Alignment	Reuven Barkat	
Alignment	Yigal Allon	
Alignment	Yosef Almogi	
Alignment	Reuven Arazi	
Alignment	Shoshana Arbeli-Almozlino	
Alignment	Moshe Baram	
Alignment	Ya'akov Hazan	
Alignment	Menachem Cohen	
Alignment	David Coren	
Alignment	Yitzhak Coren	
Alignment	Adiel Amorai	
Alignment	Ari Ankorion	
Alignment	Abba Eban	
Alignment	Aryeh Eliav	
Alignment	Ada Feinberg-Sireni	
Alignment	Abd el-Aziz el-Zoubi	
Alignment	Yisrael Galili	
Alignment	Uzi Feinerman	
Alignment	Haika Grossman	
Alignment	Zina Harman	
Alignment	Ze'ev Herring	
Alignment	Shlomo Hillel	
Alignment	Yisrael Kargman	
Alignment	Shalom Levin	
Alignment	Zvi Dinstein	
Alignment	Moshe Carmel	
Alignment	Yisrael Yeshayahu	
Alignment	Meir Ya'ari	
Alignment	Gad Yaacobi	
Alignment	Haim Yosef Zadok	
Alignment	Avraham Zilberberg	
Alignment	Mathilda Guez	
Alignment	Zvi Guershoni	
Alignment	Yizhar Harari	
Alignment	Mordechai Zar	
Alignment	Aharon Yadlin	
Alignment	Ben-Zion Halfon	
Alignment	Golda Meir	
Alignment	Haim Gvati	
Alignment	Shlomo Rosen	
Alignment	Mordechai Surkis	
Alignment	Yehonatan Yifrah	
Alignment	Moshe Wertman	
Gahal	Aharon Goldstein	
Gahal	Yosef Sapir	
Gahal	Yosef Tamir	
Gahal	Yohanan Bader	
Gahal	Avraham Katz	
Gahal	Menachem Yedid	
Gahal	Yosef Serlin	
Gahal	Moshe Nissim	
Gahal	Haim Corfu	
Gahal	Yosef Kremerman	
Gahal	Avraham Shekhterman	
Gahal	Simha Erlich	
Gahal	Zvi Zimmerman	
Gahal	Menachem Begin	
Gahal	Haim Landau	
Gahal	David Levy	
Gahal	Aryeh Ben-Eliezer	
Gahal	Yitzhak Klinghoffer	
Gahal	Elimelekh Rimalt	
Gahal	Ya'akov Nehushtan	
Gahal	Binyamin Halevi	
Gahal	Zalman Abramov	
Gahal	Esther Raziel-Naor	
Gahal	Dov Milman	
Gahal	Yoram Aridor	
Gahal	Ben-Zion Keshet	
National Religious Party	Shlomo-Yisrael Ben-Meir	
National Religious Party	Michael Hasani	
National Religious Party	Yitzhak Rafael	
National Religious Party	Daniel-Yitzhak Levy	
National Religious Party	Zevulun Hammer	
National Religious Party	Moshe-Zvi Neria	
National Religious Party	Tova Sanhadray	
National Religious Party	Zerach Warhaftig	
National Religious Party	Haim-Moshe Shapira	
National Religious Party	Binyamin Shahor	
National Religious Party	Yosef Burg	
National Religious Party	Simcha Friedman	
Agudat Yisrael	Shlomo-Ya'akov Gross	
Agudat Yisrael	Yitzhak-Meir Levin	
Agudat Yisrael	Shlomo Lorincz	
Agudat Yisrael	Menachem Porush	
Independent Liberals	Gideon Hausner	
Independent Liberals	Yitzhak Golan	
Independent Liberals	Yehuda Sha'ari	
Independent Liberals	Moshe Kol	
National List	Isser Harel	
National List	David Ben-Gurion	
National List	Meir Avizohar	Defected to the Alignment, before sitting as an independent
National List	Yigal Hurvitz	
Rakah	Emile Habibi	
Rakah	Tawfik Toubi	
Rakah	Meir Vilner	
Progress and Development	Seif el-Din el-Zoubi	
Progress and Development	Jabr Muadi	
Poalei Agudat Yisrael	Kalman Kahana	
Poalei Agudat Yisrael	Avraham Verdiger	
Cooperation and Brotherhood	Diyab Obeid	
Cooperation and Brotherhood	Elias Nakhleh	
HaOlam HaZeh – Koah Hadash	Uri Avnery	Left party to establish Meri
HaOlam HaZeh – Koah Hadash	Shalom Cohen	Left party to sit as an independent
Free Centre	Shmuel Tamir	
Free Centre	Eliezer Shostak	
Maki	Moshe Sneh	

=== Replacements ===
MK	Replaced	Date	Party	Notes
Nissim Eliad	Moshe Kol	15 December 1969	Independent Liberals	
Yosef Goldschmidt	Yosef Burg	15 December 1969	National Religious Party	
Avraham Melamed	Zerach Warhaftig	15 December 1969	National Religious Party	
Gideon Patt	Aryeh Ben-Eliezer	29 January 1970	Gahal	
Zalman Shoval	David Ben-Gurion	27 May 1970	National List	
Avner Shaki	Haim-Moshe Shapira	16 July 1970	National Religious Party	Left party to become an independent
Yehuda Ben-Meir	Shlomo-Yisrael Ben-Meir	4 April 1971	National Religious Party	
Yehuda Meir Abramowicz	Yitzhak-Meir Levin	7 August 1971	Agudat Yisrael	
Moshe Shahal	Mordechai Ofer	1 September 1971	Alignment	
Avraham Levenbraun	Emile Habibi	16 February 1972	Rakah	
Matityahu Drobles	Yosef Sapir	26 February 1972	Gahal	
Shmuel Mikunis	Moshe Sneh	1 March 1972	Maki	Maki merged into Moked
Aviad Yafeh	Reuven Barkat	5 April 1972	Alignment	
Ya'akov Mizrahi	Shlomo-Ya'akov Gross	27 November 1972	Agudat Yisrael	
