= Leader of the Opposition (Israel) =

Parliamentary position in the Knesset

- רֹאשׁ הַאוֹפּוֹזִיצְיָה; Rosh Ha-Opozitzya
- Incumbent; Vacant since 10 November 2026
- Term length: While leader of the largest political party in the Knesset that is not in government
- First holder: Meir Ya'ari

In Israel, the Leader of the Opposition (Hebrew: רֹאשׁ הַאוֹפּוֹזִיצְיָה, Rosh HaOpozitzya) is the politician who leads the Official Opposition in the Knesset, the Israeli parliament. The Leader of the Opposition is, by convention, the leader of the largest political party in the Knesset that is not in (or supports) the government.

== History ==
=== Informal role, until 2000 ===
Until 2000, the role of the opposition leader was not an official position, but rather an honorary role. The leader of the opposition was the leader of the largest party not in government.

Even with the absence of a law defining the role of the opposition leader, it was customary for the prime minister to hold regular meetings with the leader of the largest opposition party. However, this was done only at the prerogative of the prime minister.

=== Formalised role, post-2000 ===
In early 2000, two bills to amend the Opposition Leader's status were submitted to the Knesset, one by the government and one by MK Uzi Landau. The bills were merged into one amendment, and on 17 July 2000, the Knesset approved Amendment 8 to the "Knesset Law" of 1994, adding chapter 6 that outlined the role of the Leader of the Opposition. The law stipulates the selection of the Opposition Leader, the method of their replacement, regulates their ceremonial role in various official events, and obliges the prime minister to update them once a month. The law also stipulates that the Opposition Leader's salary will be determined by Knesset committee, and shall not be lower than a salary of a Cabinet minister.

== List of Opposition leaders ==
=== Leaders of the largest opposition party ===
Name (Birth–Death)		Portrait	Party	Term start	Term end	Government(s) opposed	Prime minister(s) opposed	Knesset
1	Meir Ya'ari מאיר יערי (1897–1987)		Mapam	10 March 1949	8 October 1951	1	David Ben-Gurion (Mapai)	1st
1	Meir Ya'ari מאיר יערי (1897–1987)		Mapam	10 March 1949	8 October 1951	2	David Ben-Gurion (Mapai)	1st
2	Peretz Bernstein פרץ ברנשטיין (1890–1971)		General Zionists	8 October 1951	24 December 1952	3	David Ben-Gurion (Mapai)	2nd
(1)	Meir Ya'ari מאיר יערי (1897–1987)		Mapam	24 December 1952	29 June 1955	4	David Ben-Gurion (Mapai)	2nd
(1)	Meir Ya'ari מאיר יערי (1897–1987)		Mapam	24 December 1952	29 June 1955	5	Moshe Sharett (Mapai)	2nd
(2)	Peretz Bernstein פרץ ברנשטיין (1890–1971)		General Zionists	29 June 1955	3 November 1955	6	Moshe Sharett (Mapai)	2nd
3	Menachem Begin מנחם בגין (1913–1992)		Herut	3 November 1955	5 June 1967	7	David Ben-Gurion (Mapai)	3rd
3	Menachem Begin מנחם בגין (1913–1992)		Herut	3 November 1955	5 June 1967	8	David Ben-Gurion (Mapai)	3rd
3	Menachem Begin מנחם בגין (1913–1992)		Herut	3 November 1955	5 June 1967	9	David Ben-Gurion (Mapai)	4th
3	Menachem Begin מנחם בגין (1913–1992)		Herut	3 November 1955	5 June 1967	10	David Ben-Gurion (Mapai)	5th
3	Menachem Begin מנחם בגין (1913–1992)		Herut	3 November 1955	5 June 1967	11	Levi Eshkol (Mapai 1963–1966; Mapai/Labor Alignment 1966–1967)	5th
3	Menachem Begin מנחם בגין (1913–1992)		Herut	3 November 1955	5 June 1967	12	Levi Eshkol (Mapai 1963–1966; Mapai/Labor Alignment 1966–1967)	5th
3	Menachem Begin מנחם בגין (1913–1992)		Gahal; Herut	3 November 1955	5 June 1967	13	Levi Eshkol (Mapai 1963–1966; Mapai/Labor Alignment 1966–1967)	6th
4	Yitzhak-Meir Levin יצחק-מאיר לוין (1893–1971)		Agudat Yisrael	5 June 1967	6 August 1970	14	Golda Meir (Labor/Alignment)	6th
4	Yitzhak-Meir Levin יצחק-מאיר לוין (1893–1971)		Agudat Yisrael	5 June 1967	6 August 1970	15	Golda Meir (Labor/Alignment)	7th
(3)	Menachem Begin מנחם בגין (1913–1992)		Gahal; Herut	6 August 1970	21 June 1977	15	Golda Meir (Labor/Alignment)	7th
(3)	Menachem Begin מנחם בגין (1913–1992)		Likud; Herut	6 August 1970	21 June 1977	15	Golda Meir (Labor/Alignment)	
(3)	Menachem Begin מנחם בגין (1913–1992)		Likud; Herut	6 August 1970	21 June 1977	16	Golda Meir (Labor/Alignment)	8th
(3)	Menachem Begin מנחם בגין (1913–1992)		Likud; Herut	6 August 1970	21 June 1977	17	Yitzhak Rabin (Labor/Alignment)	8th
5	Shimon Peres שמעון פרס (1923–2016)		Alignment; Labor Party	21 June 1977	13 September 1984	18	Menachem Begin (Herut/Likud	9th
5	Shimon Peres שמעון פרס (1923–2016)		Alignment; Labor Party	21 June 1977	13 September 1984	19	Menachem Begin (Herut/Likud	10th
5	Shimon Peres שמעון פרס (1923–2016)		Alignment; Labor Party	21 June 1977	13 September 1984	20	Yitzhak Shamir (Herut/Likud)	10th
6	Yuval Ne'eman יובל נאמן (1925–2006)		Tehiya-Tzomet; Tehiya	13 September 1984	22 October 1984	21	Shimon Peres (Labor/Alignment)	11th
7	Victor Shem-Tov ויקטור שם-טוב (1915–2014)		Mapam	22 October 1984	15 March 1988	21	Shimon Peres (Labor/Alignment)	11th
7	Victor Shem-Tov ויקטור שם-טוב (1915–2014)		Mapam	22 October 1984	15 March 1988	22	Yitzhak Shamir (Herut/Likud 1986–1988; Likud 1988–1992	11th
8	Yair Tzaban יאיר צבן (born 1930)		Mapam	15 March 1988	22 December 1988	22	Yitzhak Shamir (Herut/Likud 1986–1988; Likud 1988–1992	11th
9	Shulamit Aloni שולמית אלוני (1928–2014)		Ratz	22 December 1988	15 March 1990	23	Yitzhak Shamir (Herut/Likud 1986–1988; Likud 1988–1992	12th
(5)	Shimon Peres שמעון פרס (1923–2016)		Alignment; Labor Party	15 March 1990	20 February 1992	24	Yitzhak Shamir (Herut/Likud 1986–1988; Likud 1988–1992	12th
(5)	Shimon Peres שמעון פרס (1923–2016)		Labor Party	15 March 1990	20 February 1992	24	Yitzhak Shamir (Herut/Likud 1986–1988; Likud 1988–1992	12th
10	Yitzhak Rabin יִצְחָק רַבִּין (1922–1995)		Labor Party	20 February 1992	13 July 1992	24	Yitzhak Shamir (Herut/Likud 1986–1988; Likud 1988–1992	12th
11	Yitzhak Shamir יצחק שמיר (1915–2012)		Likud	13 July 1992	24 March 1993	25	Yitzhak Rabin (Labor)	13th
12	Benjamin Netanyahu בנימין נתניהו (born 1949)		Likud	24 March 1993	18 June 1996	25	Yitzhak Rabin (Labor)	13th
12	Benjamin Netanyahu בנימין נתניהו (born 1949)		Likud	24 March 1993	18 June 1996	26	Shimon Peres (Labor)	13th
12	Benjamin Netanyahu בנימין נתניהו (born 1949)		Likud-Gesher-Tzomet; Likud	24 March 1993	18 June 1996	26	Shimon Peres (Labor)	13th
(5)	Shimon Peres שמעון פרס (1923–2016)		Labor Party	18 June 1996	1 July 1997	27	Benjamin Netanyahu (Likud)	14th
13	Ehud Barak אהוד ברק (born 1942)		Labor Party	1 July 1997	6 July 1999	27	Benjamin Netanyahu (Likud)	14th
13	Ehud Barak אהוד ברק (born 1942)		One Israel; Labor Party	1 July 1997	6 July 1999	27	Benjamin Netanyahu (Likud)	14th
14	Ariel Sharon אריאל שרון (1928–2014)		Likud	6 July 1999	30 July 2000	28	Ehud Barak (Labor)	15th

=== Designated Opposition Leaders ===
After Amendment 8 to the "Knesset law" of 1994 was passed, the Leader of the Opposition became an official position held by the leader of the largest faction within the opposition.

Name (Birth–Death)		Portrait	Party	Term start	Term end	Government(s) opposed	Prime minister(s) opposed	Knesset
14	Ariel Sharon אריאל שרון (1928–2014)		Likud	31 July 2000	7 March 2001	28	Ehud Barak (Labor)	15th
15	Yossi Sarid יוסי שריד (1940–2015)		Meretz	7 March 2001	4 November 2002	29	Ariel Sharon (Likud 2001–2005; Kadima 2005–2006)	15th
16	Binyamin Ben-Eliezer בנימין בן אליעזר (1936–2016)		Labor Party	4 November 2002	12 March 2003	29	Ariel Sharon (Likud 2001–2005; Kadima 2005–2006)	15th
16	Binyamin Ben-Eliezer בנימין בן אליעזר (1936–2016)		Labor Party	4 November 2002	12 March 2003	30	Ariel Sharon (Likud 2001–2005; Kadima 2005–2006)	16th
17	Amram Mitzna עמרם מצנע (born 1945)		Labor-Meimad; Labor Party	12 March 2003	13 May 2003	30	Ariel Sharon (Likud 2001–2005; Kadima 2005–2006)	16th
18	Dalia Itzik דליה איציק (born 1952)		Labor-Meimad; Labor Party	13 May 2003	25 June 2003	30	Ariel Sharon (Likud 2001–2005; Kadima 2005–2006)	16th
(5)	Shimon Peres שמעון פרס (1923–2016)		Labor-Meimad; Labor Party	25 June 2003	10 January 2005	30	Ariel Sharon (Likud 2001–2005; Kadima 2005–2006)	16th
19	Yosef Lapid יוסף לפיד (1931–2008)		Shinui	10 January 2005	23 November 2005	30	Ariel Sharon (Likud 2001–2005; Kadima 2005–2006)	16th
20	Amir Peretz עמיר פרץ (born 1952)		Labor-Meimad; Labor Party	23 November 2005	16 January 2006	30	Ariel Sharon (Likud 2001–2005; Kadima 2005–2006)	16th
(12)	Benjamin Netanyahu בנימין נתניהו (born 1949)		Likud	16 January 2006	17 April 2006	30	Ariel Sharon (Likud 2001–2005; Kadima 2005–2006)	16th
(12)	Benjamin Netanyahu בנימין נתניהו (born 1949)		Likud	17 April 2006	31 March 2009	31	Ehud Olmert (Kadima)	17th
21	Tzipi Livni ציפי לבני (born 1958)		Kadima	6 April 2009	2 April 2012	32	Benjamin Netanyahu (Likud)	18th
22	Shaul Mofaz שאול מופז (born 1948)		Kadima	2 April 2012	9 May 2012	32	Benjamin Netanyahu (Likud)	18th
23	Shelly Yachimovich שלי יחימוביץ׳ (born 1960)		Labor Party	9 May 2012	23 July 2012	32	Benjamin Netanyahu (Likud)	18th
(22)	Shaul Mofaz שאול מופז (born 1948)		Kadima	23 July 2012	5 February 2013	32	Benjamin Netanyahu (Likud)	18th
(21)	Shelly Yachimovich שלי יחימוביץ׳ (born 1960)		Labor Party	5 February 2013	25 November 2013	32	Benjamin Netanyahu (Likud)	
(21)	Shelly Yachimovich שלי יחימוביץ׳ (born 1960)		Labor Party	5 February 2013	25 November 2013	33	Benjamin Netanyahu (Likud)	19th
24	Isaac Herzog יצחק הרצוג (1960–)		Labor Party	25 November 2013	14 May 2015	33	Benjamin Netanyahu (Likud)	19th
24	Isaac Herzog יצחק הרצוג (1960–)		Zionist Union; Labor Party	25 November 2013	14 May 2015	33	Benjamin Netanyahu (Likud)	19th
24	Isaac Herzog יצחק הרצוג (1960–)		Zionist Union; Labor Party	14 May 2015	31 July 2018	34	Benjamin Netanyahu (Likud)	20th
(21)	Tzipi Livni ציפי לבני (born 1958)		Zionist Union; Hatnuah	1 August 2018	1 January 2019	34	Benjamin Netanyahu (Likud)	20th
(23)	Shelly Yachimovich שלי יחימוביץ׳ (born 1960)		Labor Party	1 January 2019	30 April 2019	34	Benjamin Netanyahu (Likud)	20th
(23)	Shelly Yachimovich שלי יחימוביץ׳ (born 1960)		Labor Party	1 January 2019	30 April 2019	34	Benjamin Netanyahu (Likud)	21st 22nd
	Vacant de jure, Benny Gantz de facto			30 April 2019	17 May 2020	34	Benjamin Netanyahu (Likud)	21st 22nd
25	Yair Lapid יאיר לפיד (born 1963)		Yesh Atid	17 May 2020	6 April 2021	35	Benjamin Netanyahu (Likud)	23rd
(12)	Benjamin Netanyahu בנימין נתניהו (born 1949)		Likud	28 June 2021	29 December 2022	36	Naftali Bennett (Yamina/New Right); Yair Lapid (Yesh Atid)	24th
(25)	Yair Lapid יאיר לפיד (born 1963)		Yesh Atid	2 January 2023	10 November 2026	37	Benjamin Netanyahu (Likud)	25th

== See also ==
- Shadow Cabinet of Tommy Lapid
