= Fourth government of Israel =

1952–54 government led by David Ben-Gurion

- 4th Cabinet of Israel

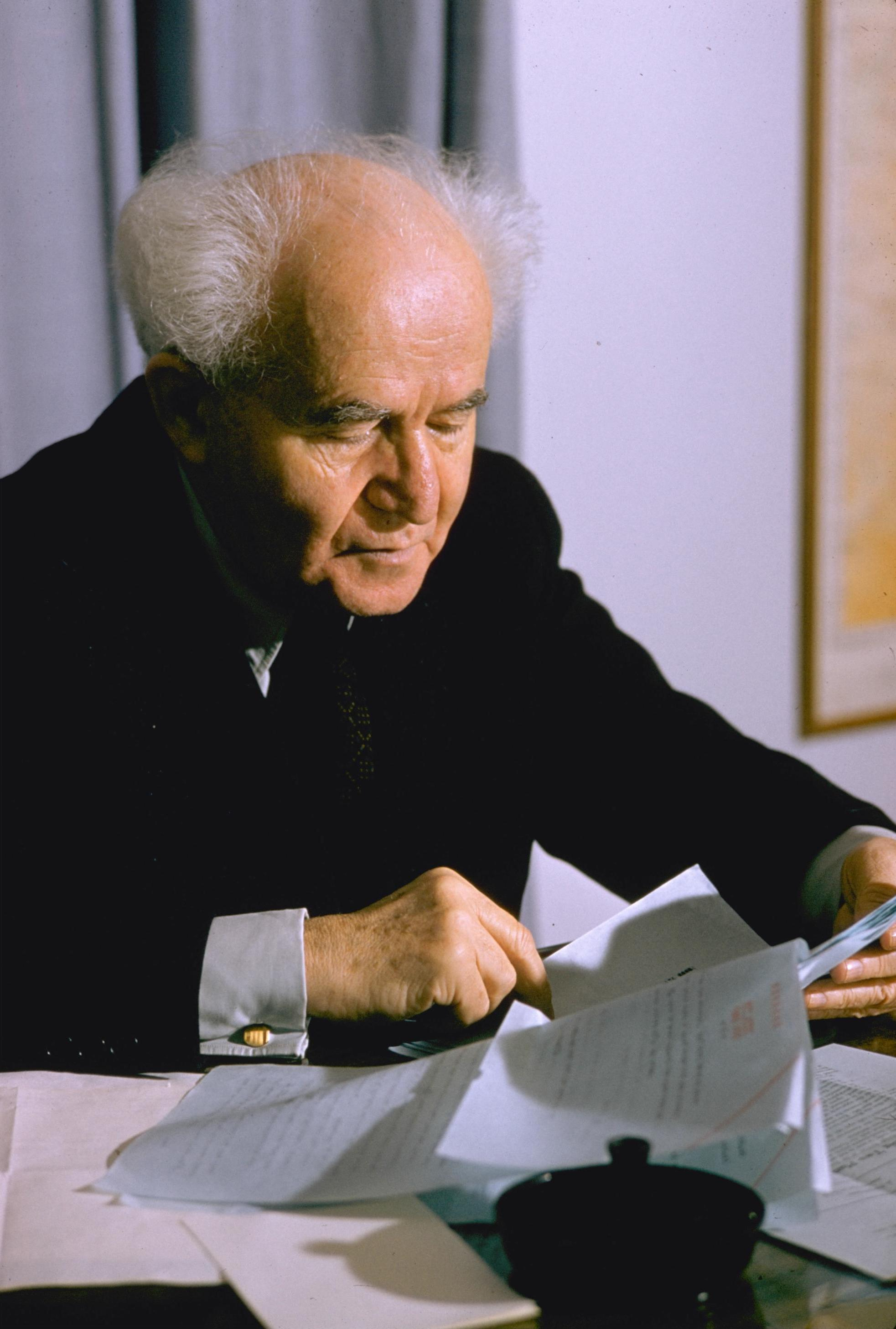
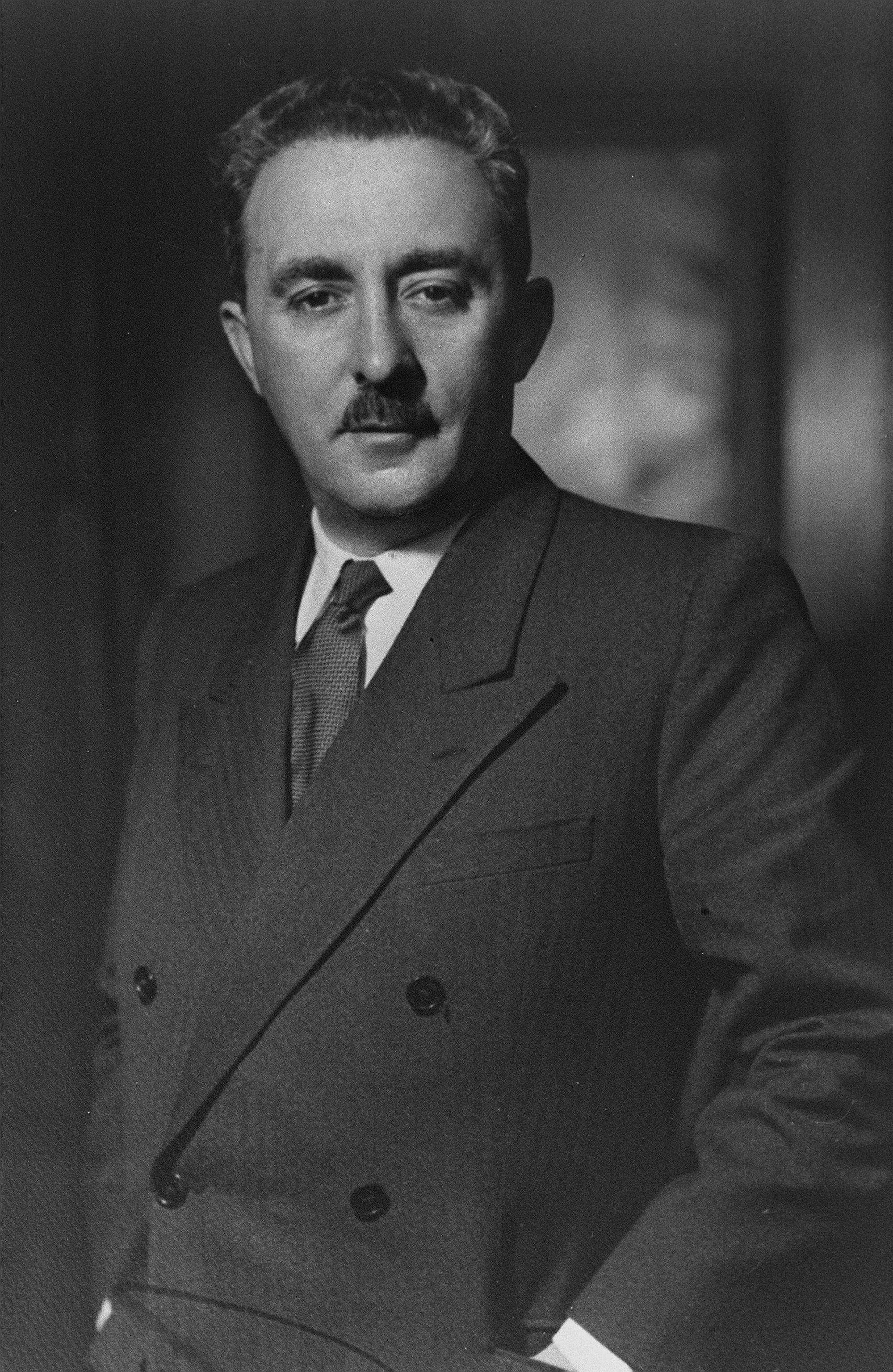
- Date formed: 24 December 1952
- Date dissolved: 26 January 1954

People and organisations
- Head of state: Yitzhak Ben-Zvi
- Head of government: David Ben-Gurion (to 7 December 1953) Moshe Sharett (acting from 7 December 1953)
- Member parties: Mapai; General Zionists; Progressive Party; Hapoel HaMizrachi; Mizrachi; Democratic List for Israeli Arabs; Progress and Work; Agriculture and Development
- Status in legislature: Coalition
- Opposition leader: Meir Ya'ari

History
- Legislature term: 2nd Knesset
- Predecessor: 3rd cabinet of Israel
- Successor: 5th cabinet of Israel

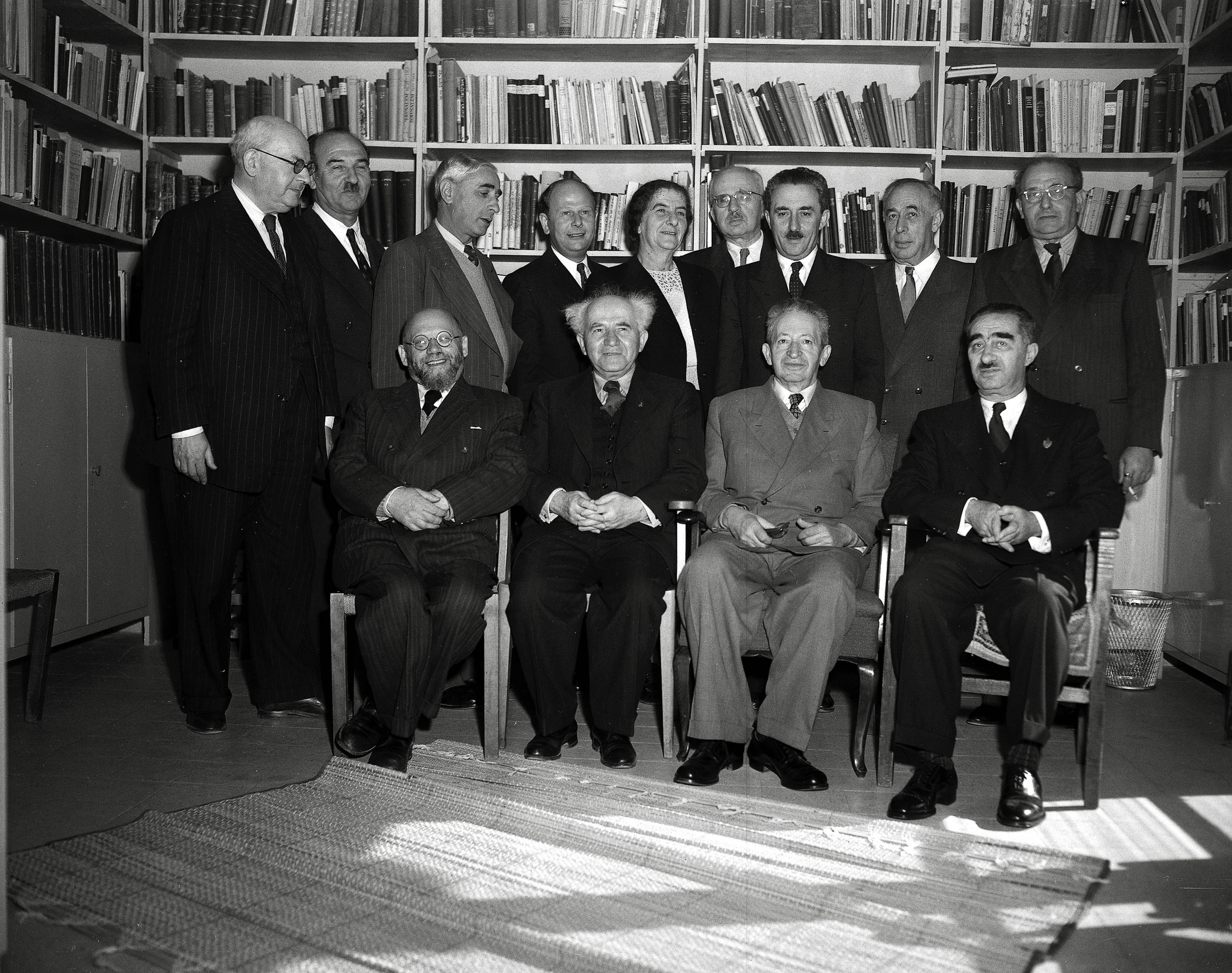
Ministers of the Fourth Government with the President on 24 December 1952. Sitting from left to right: Ben-Zion Dinor, David Ben-Gurion, President Yitzhak Ben-Zvi, Dov Yosef. Standing from left to right: Peretz Naftali, Levi Eshkol, Pinchas Lavon, Yosef Serlin, Golda Meir, Pinhas Rosen, Moshe Sharett, Israel Rokach and Peretz Bernstein.

The fourth government of Israel was formed by David Ben-Gurion during the second Knesset on 24 December 1952.

== History ==
Ben-Gurion dropped the ultra-orthodox parties Agudat Yisrael and Poalei Agudat Yisrael from his coalition and replaced them with the General Zionists and the Progressive Party, who formed the government together with Mapai, Mizrachi, Hapoel HaMizrachi, the Democratic List for Israeli Arabs, Progress and Work and Agriculture and Development.

The government fell when Ben-Gurion resigned on 6 December 1953 and moved to the Negev kibbutz of Sde Boker.

Fourth Government of Israel
Portfolio	Minister	Party
Prime Minister; Minister of Defense	David Ben-Gurion	Mapai
Minister of Agriculture	Peretz Naftali	Mapai
Minister of Development	Dov Yosef (15 June 1953 – 24 January 1954)	Mapai
Minister of Education and Culture	Ben-Zion Dinor	Not an MK
Minister of Finance	Levi Eshkol	Mapai
Minister of Foreign Affairs	Moshe Sharett	Mapai
Minister of Health	Yosef Sapir (24 December 1952 – 29 December 1953)	General Zionists
Minister of Health	Yosef Serlin (29 December 1953 – 26 January 1954)	General Zionists
Minister of Internal Affairs	Israel Rokah	General Zionists
Minister of Justice	Pinchas Rosen	Progressive Party
Minister of Labour	Golda Meir	Mapai
Minister of Police	Bechor-Shalom Sheetrit	Mapai
Minister of Postal Services	Yosef Burg	Hapoel HaMizrachi
Minister of Religions; Minister of Welfare	Haim-Moshe Shapira	Hapoel HaMizrachi
Minister of Trade and Industry	Peretz Bernstein	General Zionists
Minister of Transportation	Yosef Serlin (24 December 1952 – 29 December 1953)	General Zionists
Minister of Transportation	Yosef Sapir (29 December 1953 – 26 January 1954)	General Zionists
Minister without Portfolio	Dov Yosef (24 December 1952 – 15 June 1953)	Mapai
Minister without Portfolio	Pinhas Lavon	Mapai
Deputy Minister of Agriculture	Yosef Efrati	Mapai
Deputy Minister of Religions	Zerach Warhaftig (5 January 1953 – 24 January 1954)	Hapoel HaMizrachi
Deputy Minister of Trade and Industry	Zalman Suzayiv (15 June 1953 – 24 January 1954)	General Zionists
Deputy Minister of Welfare	Shlomo-Yisrael Ben-Meir (5 January 1953 – 24 January 1954)	Mizrachi
