= Fifth government of Israel =

1954–55 government led by Moshe Sharett

First Sharett Cabinet
- 5th Cabinet of Israel

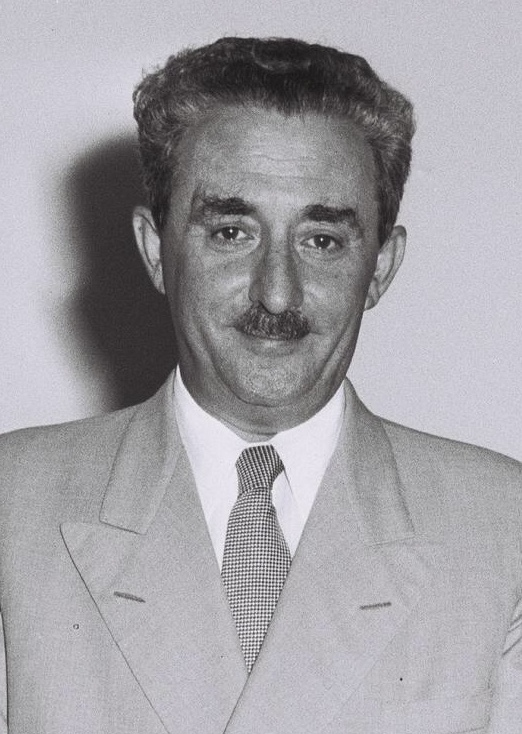
- Date formed: 26 January 1954
- Date dissolved: 29 June 1955

People and organisations
- Head of state: Yitzhak Ben-Zvi
- Head of government: Moshe Sharett
- Member parties: Mapai; General Zionists; Progressive Party; Hapoel HaMizrachi; Mizrachi; Democratic List for Israeli Arabs; Progress and Work; Agriculture and Development
- Status in legislature: coalition
- Opposition leader: Meir Ya'ari

History
- Legislature term: 2nd Knesset
- Predecessor: 4th cabinet of Israel
- Successor: 6th cabinet of Israel

The fifth government of Israel was formed by Moshe Sharett during the second Knesset on 26 January 1954, and was the first government not led by David Ben-Gurion. Sharett kept the same coalition partners as during the fourth government, i.e. Mapai, the General Zionists, the Progressive Party, Mizrachi, Hapoel HaMizrachi, the Democratic List for Israeli Arabs, Progress and Work and Agriculture and Development.

The only changes to the previous government were Sharett taking over as PM, Pinhas Lavon as Minister of Defense, the addition of Zalman Aran as a Minister without Portfolio and the dropping of the two Mizrachi and Hapoel HaMizrachi Deputy Ministerial posts.

Ben-Gurion returned to the government in February 1955, replacing Lavon following the former's resignation over the Lavon Affair.

The government fell when Sharett resigned on 29 June 1955, when the General Zionists refused to abstain from voting on a motion of no-confidence brought by Herut and Maki over the government's position on the trial of Malkiel Gruenwald, who had accused Israel Kastzner of collaborating with the Nazis.

Fifth government of Israel
Portfolio	Minister	Party
Prime Minister; Minister of Foreign Affairs	Moshe Sharett	Mapai
Minister of Agriculture	Peretz Naftali	Mapai
Minister of Defense	Pinhas Lavon (26 January 1954 – 21 February 1955)	Mapai
Minister of Defense	David Ben-Gurion (21 February – 29 June 1955)	Mapai
Minister of Development	Dov Yosef	Mapai
Minister of Education and Culture	Ben-Zion Dinor	Not an MK
Minister of Finance	Levi Eshkol	Mapai
Minister of Health	Yosef Serlin	General Zionists
Minister of Internal Affairs	Israel Rokah	General Zionists
Minister of Justice	Pinchas Rosen	Progressive Party
Minister of Labour	Golda Meir	Mapai
Minister of Police	Bechor-Shalom Sheetrit	Mapai
Minister of Postal Services	Yosef Burg	Hapoel HaMizrachi
Minister of Religions; Minister of Welfare	Haim-Moshe Shapira	Hapoel HaMizrachi
Minister of Trade and Industry	Peretz Bernstein	General Zionists
Minister of Transportation	Yosef Sapir	General Zionists
Minister without Portfolio	Zalman Aran	Mapai
Deputy Minister of Religions	Zorach Warhaftig (27 January – 24 May 1954, 15 June 1954 - 29 June 1955)	Hapoel HaMizrachi
Deputy Minister of Agriculture	Yosef Efrati	Mapai
Deputy Minister of Education and Culture	Kalman Kahana	Poalei Agudat Yisrael
Deputy Minister of Trade and Industry	Zalman Suzayiv	General Zionists
