= Baruch Uziel =

Israeli politician

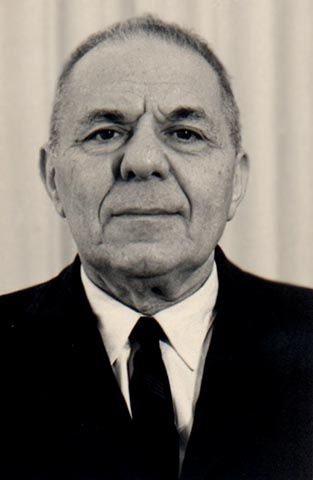
- Uziel in the 1960s

Faction represented in the Knesset
- 1961–1965: Liberal Party
- 1965–1969: Gahal

Personal details
- Born: 1 August 1901 Thessaloniki, Ottoman Empire
- Died: 20 February 1977 (aged 75)

Baruch Uziel (Hebrew: ברוך עוזיאל; 1 August 1901 – 20 February 1977) was an Israeli politician who served as a member of the Knesset for the Liberal Party and Gahal between 1961 and 1969.

== Biography ==
Born in Thessaloniki in the Ottoman Empire (today in Greece), Uziel made aliyah to Ottoman-controlled Palestine in 1914. However, during World War I he was exiled to Damascus. He returned to Palestine and studied at a Teachers Seminary in Jerusalem, and worked as a teacher in Rehovot and Petah Tikva. He later attended the Law School of Jerusalem, where he was certified as a lawyer, and from 1934 onwards practiced law.

Uziel became a member of the Jewish National Council and the fourth Assembly of Representatives. He was amongst the founders of HaOved HaTzioni, and was involved in helping Jewish port workers from Thessaloniki make aliyah, and was a member of the Association of Greek Immigrants and Chairman of the Institute for Research of Thessaloniki Jewry.

A member of the Progressive Party, he became a member of the Liberal Party formed by the merger of the Progressive Party and the General Zionists. He was elected to the Knesset on the Liberal Party's list in 1961, and was re-elected on the Gahal list (formed by an alliance of the Liberal Party and Herut) in 1965. He lost his seat in the 1969 elections.

He died in 1977 at the age of 75.
