= Aharon Goldstein =

Israeli politician

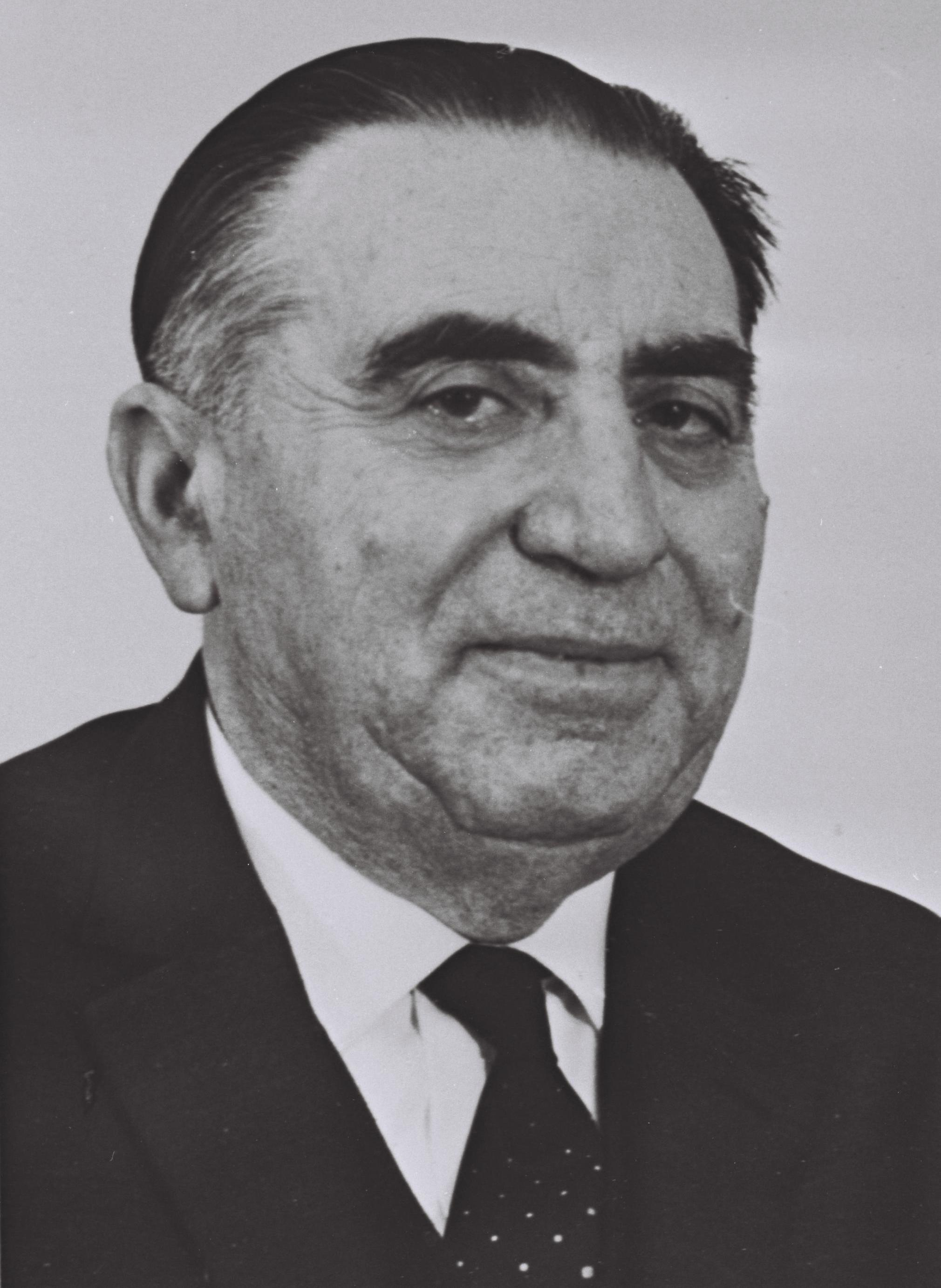
- Goldstein in 1969

Faction represented in the Knesset
- 1963–1965: Liberal Party
- 1965–1974: Gahal

Personal details
- Born: 19 December 1902 Zlatopol, Russian Empire
- Died: 12 October 1976 (aged 73)

Aharon Goldstein (Hebrew: אהרן גולדשטיין; 19 December 1902 – 12 October 1976) was an Israeli politician who served as a member of the Knesset for the Liberal Party and Gahal between 1963 and 1974.

== Biography ==
Born in Zlatopol, a shtetl in the Russian Empire (today in Ukraine), Goldstein was educated at a heder and high school, before making aliyah to Palestine in 1921.

He was a member of the Hebrew Pioneer, and also joined the Gdud HaAvoda work brigade. He worked in construction, and was one of the founders of the Borochov neighbourhood and Giv'atayim council. In 1952 he was elected chairman of the Israel Contractors and Builders Association.

Active in the Haganah during the Mandate era, Goldstein was a member of the Liberal Party's central committee. He was on the party's list for the 1961 elections, and although he failed to win a seat, he entered the Knesset on 11 November 1963 as a replacement for Idov Cohen, who had resigned. He retained his seat in elections in 1965 and 1969 (in which the Liberal Party formed part of the Gahal alliance), before losing his seat in the 1973 elections.

He died at his home in Givatayim in 1976 at the age of 73.
