= Niv Publishing =

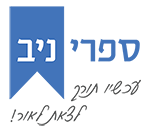
- Founded: 2013
- Founder: Yehuda Niv
- Country of origin: Israel
- Headquarters location: Herzliya
- Distribution: Israel and World-wide
- Key people: Nir Ido (CEO)
- Publication types: Books
- Nonfiction topics: Hebrew and English-language books
- No. of employees: 450
- Official website: nivbook.co.il

Niv Publishing (Hebrew: ספרי ניב) is an Israeli publishing house that serves self-published authors. In 2016, it was registered with the Companies Registry, under the name Niv Box Technologies Ltd.

== History ==
The publishing house was founded in 2013 by Yehuda Niv, an electronics engineer by training, after his debut book, "Silent Thunder," sold only dozens of copies.

In 2015, Niv Avdat, an illustrator and graphic designer, joined the publishing house as a partner, publishing two children's books - "The Beginner's Guide to the Prince" and "Doctor Panzer".

The publishing house is engaged in the production and publication of books in Hebrew in Israel, fully funded by the authors, and in providing printed matter production services to institutional and governmental bodies, such as the Ministry of Health.

In 2021, Niv Publishing launched "Spines", its AI-driven self-publishing platform.
