= Nahum Levin =

Israeli politician

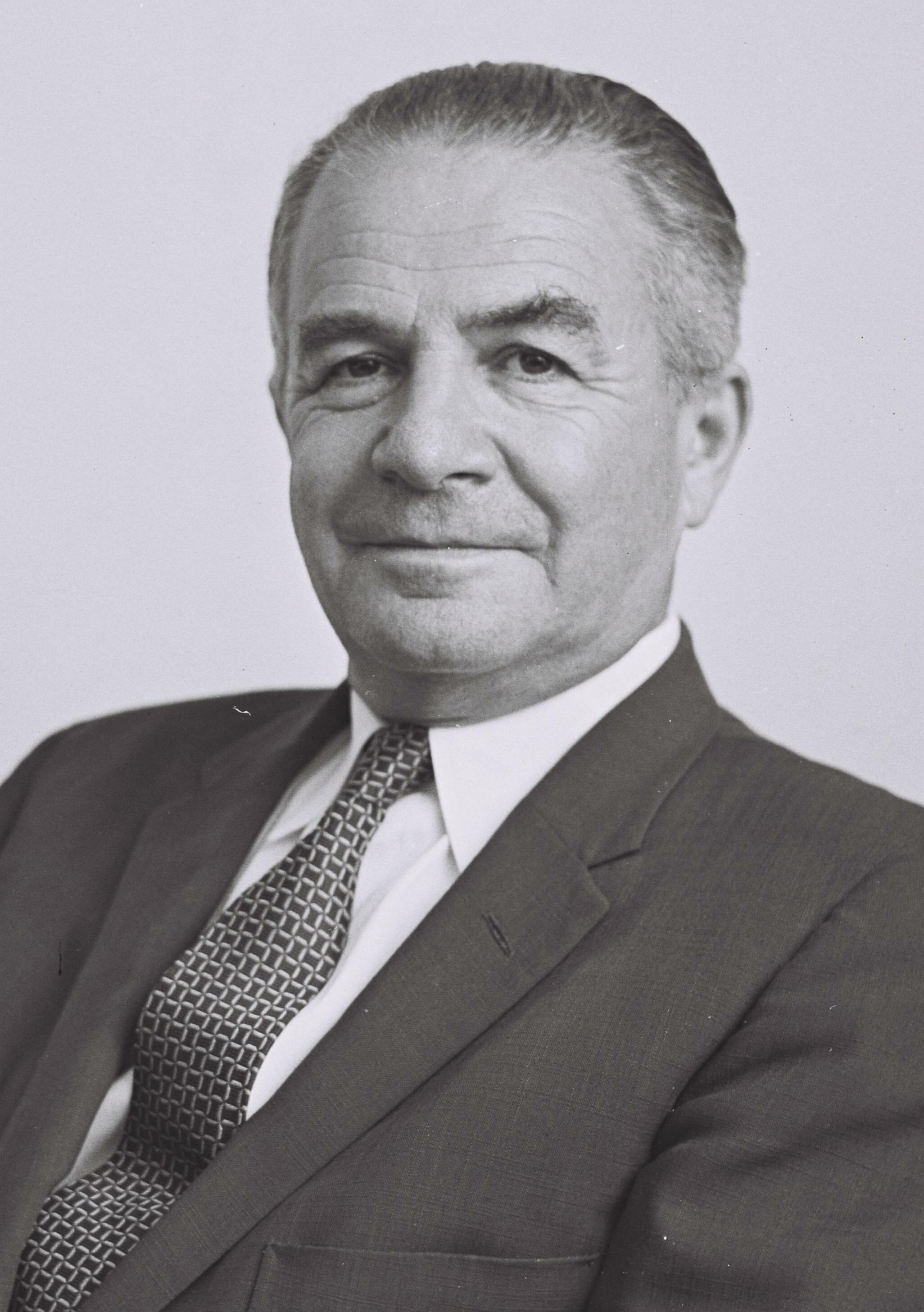
- Levin in 1959

Faction represented in the Knesset
- 1955–1965: Herut
- 1965: Gahal

Personal details
- Born: 8 June 1905; Vitebsk, Russian Empire
- Died: 8 June 1967 (aged 62)

Nahum Levin (Hebrew: נחום לוין; 8 June 1905 – 8 June 1967) was an Israeli politician who served as a member of the Knesset for Herut and Gahal from 1955 until 1965.

== Biography ==
Born in the Vitebsk, Russian Empire (modern day Belarus), Levin was a member of the central committee of the HaHaver movement. He was arrested by the Soviet authorities, and made aliyah to Mandatory Palestine in 1924. He studied at the Technion, where he was chairman of the student union, and was certified as a building engineer.

He joined the Haganah and served as a platoon commander between 1924 and 1931. He later joined the Revisionist Zionist movement and switched to the Irgun, in which he served as an officer between 1931 and 1937, before becoming a commissary officer.

A member of the Herut central committee, he was elected to the Knesset on the party's list in 1955. He was re-elected in 1959 and 1961, before losing his seat in the 1965 elections. He also served as a member of the presidium of the Israel Industrialist Association and chaired the Association of Wood Product Producers.

He died on his birthday in 1967 at the age of 62.
