= Zalman Abramov =

Israeli politician

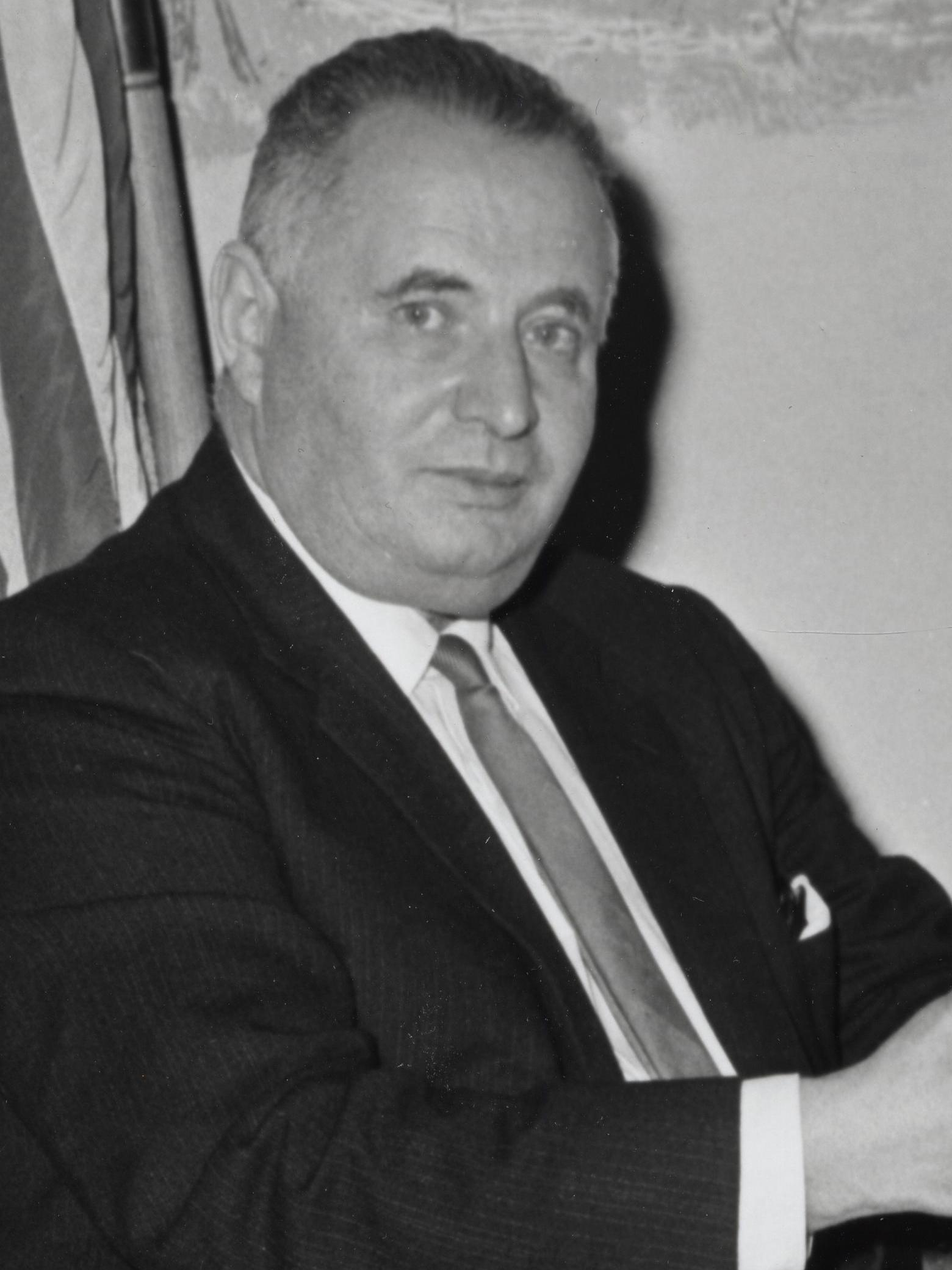
- Abramov in 1966

Faction represented in the Knesset
- 1959-1961: General Zionists
- 1961-1965: Liberal Party
- 1965-1974: Gahal
- 1974-1977: Likud

Personal details
- Born: 6 May 1908 Minsk, Russian Empire
- Died: 5 March 1997 (aged 88) Jerusalem, Israel

Shneor Zalman Abramov (Hebrew: שניאור זלמן אברמוב; 6 May 1908 – 5 March 1997) was an Israeli politician who served as a member of the Knesset between 1959 and 1977. As a writer he usually signed by using the acronym S.Z. Abramov.

== Biography ==
Born in Minsk in the Russian Empire (today in Belarus), Abramov emigrated to Palestine in 1920. He was educated at the Herzliya Hebrew High School in Tel Aviv, before studying at the Western Reserve University, obtaining a doctorate in jurisprudence. Whilst in the United States, he served as Vice President of the Zionist Students of America organisation between 1931 and 1933. He also later served as Chairman of the Israel-United States Friendship League from 1950 until 1964.

A member of the General Zionists, Abramov was elected to the Knesset on the party's list in 1959. He was re-elected in 1961, 1965, 1969 and 1973, during which time the General Zionists merged into the Liberal Party, then Gahal and later Likud. Between 1963 and 1972 he represented the Knesset at the European Council, and in 1970 he became chairman of the executive committee of the Public Council for Soviet Jewry. From 1974 until 1977 he also served as a Deputy Speaker of the Knesset.

He was considered as the major thinker and theoretician of Israeli liberalism, though his positions tended to be more moderate and progressive than those of most of the members of his own party and of other political affiliations to which he belonged. Throughout his life he remained convinced that Chaim Weizmann's vision represented the right path for Zionism.

Accordingly, he believed that Israel's strength lies in its efforts to cultivate its educational institutions and research institutes, as well as in its ability to impose moral constraints upon itself by applying a broad universal perspective also when it is bound to deal with local or regional affairs.

He died in Jerusalem in 1997.
