= Ministry of Health (Israel) =

Government ministry of Israel

- משרד הבריאות
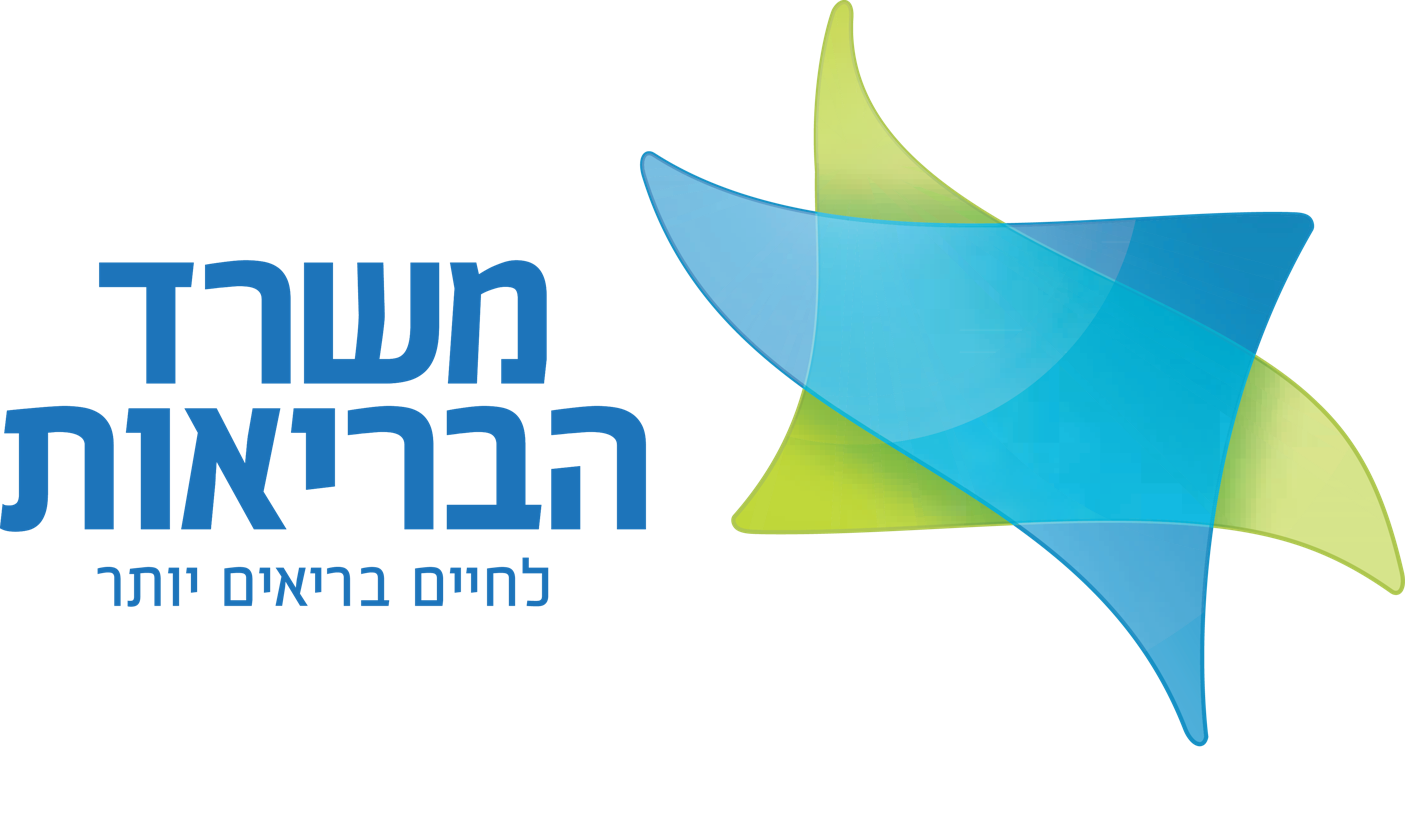
- Emblem

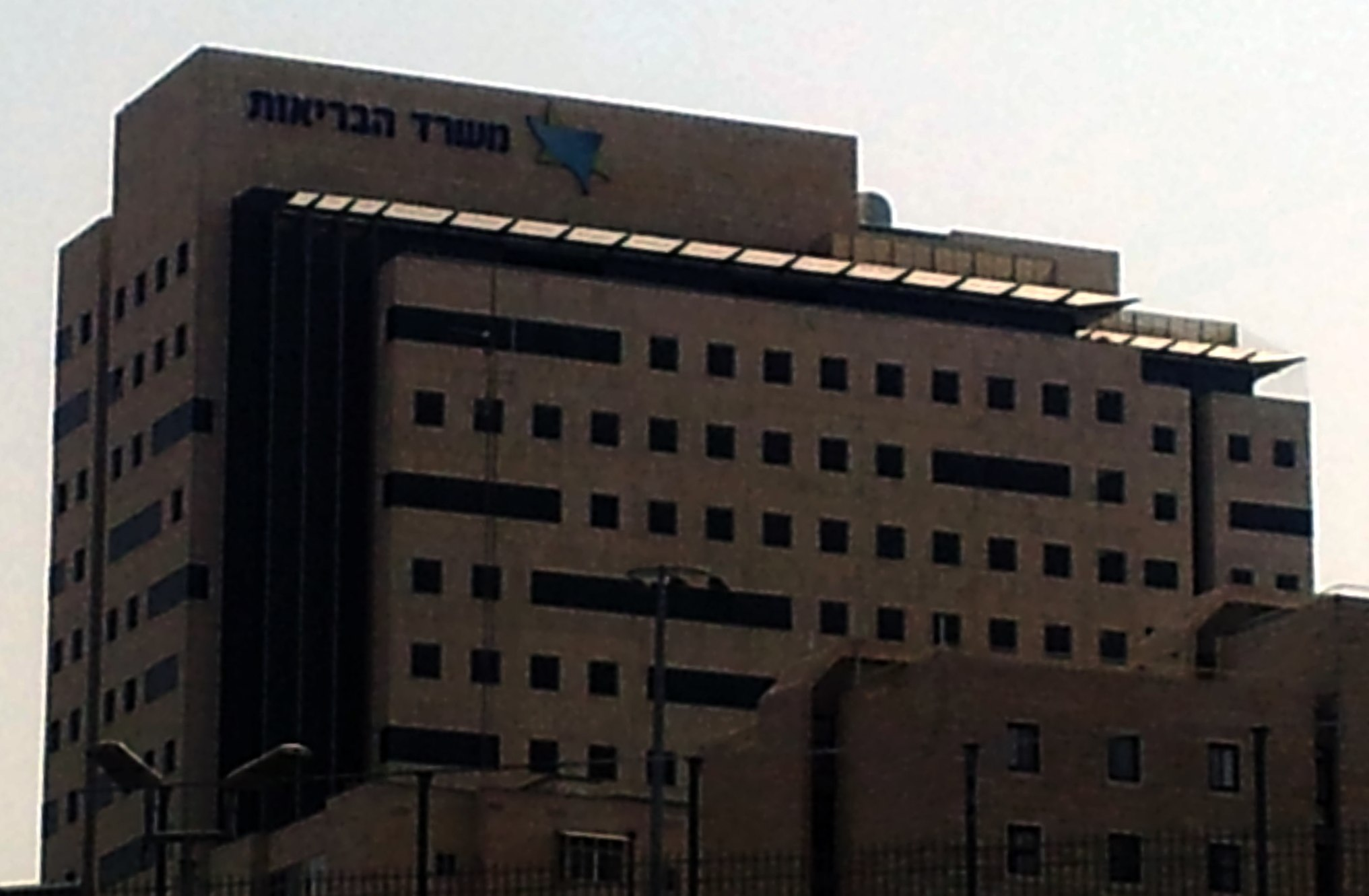
- Ministry of Health Building

Agency overview
- Formed: 1948
- Jurisdiction: Government of Israel
- Headquarters: Migdaley Habira, Jerusalem; 31°47′26.69″N 35°12′7.71″E
- Minister responsible: Haim Katz
- Agency executive: Moshe Bar Siman Tov, Director-General
- Website: www.health.gov.il

The Ministry of Health (Hebrew: מִשְׂרַד הַבְּרִיאוּת, translit. Misrad HaBri'ut) is a ministry in the Israeli government, responsible for formulating health policies. The ministry plans, supervises, licenses, and coordinates the country's health care services. In addition to overseeing health services provided by HCOs such as Kupat Holim, Maccabi et al and family health centers such as Tipat Halav, the ministry maintains general hospitals, psychiatric hospitals, mental health clinics, treatment programs for substance abuse, and facilities for the chronically ill.

== History ==
In January 2021, the ministry entered a collaborative agreement with Pfizer granting the company access to Israel citizens' personal electronic medical records in order to observe the real-world safety and efficacy of the BNT162b2 COVID-19 vaccine product.

In February 2022, the ministry banned medical professionals in Israel from providing conversion therapy.

== List of ministers ==
#	Minister	Party	Government	Term start	Term end	Notes
1	Haim-Moshe Shapira	United Religious Front, Hapoel HaMizrachi	P, 1, 2	14 May 1948	8 October 1951	
2	Yosef Burg	Hapoel HaMizrachi	3	8 October 1951	24 December 1952	
3	Yosef Sapir	General Zionists	4	24 December 1952	29 December 1952	Sapir and Serlin swapped ministerial portfolios; Sapir became Minister of Transportation
4	Yosef Serlin	General Zionists	4, 5	29 December 1953	29 June 1955	Sapir and Serlin swapped ministerial portfolios; Sapir became Minister of Transportation
5	Dov Yosef	Mapai	6	29 June 1955	3 November 1955	
6	Yisrael Barzilai	Mapam	7, 8, 9	3 November 1955	2 November 1961	
–	Haim-Moshe Shapira	National Religious Party	10, 11, 12	2 November 1961	12 January 1966	
–	Yisrael Barzilai	Not an MK	13, 14	12 January 1966	15 December 1969	Member of Mapam
7	Haim Gvati	Alignment	15	22 December 1969	27 July 1970	
8	Victor Shem-Tov	Not an MK	15, 16, 17	27 July 1970	20 June 1977	Member of the Alignment
9	Eliezer Shostak	Likud	18, 19, 20	20 June 1977	13 September 1984	
10	Mordechai Gur	Alignment	21	13 September 1984	20 October 1986	
11	Shoshana Arbeli-Almozlino	Alignment	22	20 October 1986	22 December 1988	
12	Ya'akov Tzur	Alignment	23	22 December 1988	15 March 1990	
13	Ehud Olmert	Likud	24	11 June 1990	13 July 1992	
14	Haim Ramon	Labor Party	25	13 July 1992	8 February 1994	
15	Yitzhak Rabin	Labor Party	25	8 February 1994	1 June 1994	Serving Prime Minister
16	Efraim Sneh	Labor Party	25, 26	1 June 1994	18 June 1996	
17	Tzachi Hanegbi	Likud	27	18 June 1996	12 November 1996	
18	Yehoshua Matza	Likud	27	12 November 1996	6 July 1999	
19	Shlomo Benizri	Shas	28	6 July 1999	11 July 2000	
20	Roni Milo	Centre Party	28	10 August 2000	7 March 2001	
21	Nissim Dahan	Shas	29	7 March 2001	23 May 2002	
22	Ariel Sharon	Likud	29	23 May 2002	3 June 2002	Serving Prime Minister
–	Nissim Dahan	Shas	29	3 June 2002	28 February 2003	
23	Dan Naveh	Likud	30	28 February 2003	14 January 2006	
24	Yaakov Edri	Kadima	30	18 January 2006	4 May 2006	
25	Ya'akov Ben-Yezri	Gil	31	4 May 2006	31 March 2009	
26	Benjamin Netanyahu	Likud	32	31 March 2009	18 March 2013	Serving Prime Minister
27	Yael German	Yesh Atid	33	18 March 2013	4 December 2014	
–	Benjamin Netanyahu	Likud	34	14 May 2015	27 August 2015	Serving Prime Minister
28	Ya'akov Litzman	United Torah Judaism	34	27 August 2015	28 November 2017	
–	Benjamin Netanyahu	Likud	34	28 November 2017	29 December 2019	Serving Prime Minister
–	Yaakov Litzman	United Torah Judaism	34	29 December 2019	17 May 2020	
29	Yuli Edelstein	Likud	35	17 May 2020	13 June 2021	
30	Nitzan Horowitz	Meretz	36	13 June 2021	29 December 2022	
31	Aryeh Deri	Shas	37	29 December 2022	24 January 2023	
–	Yoav Ben-Tzur	Shas	37	24 January 2023	19 April 2023	Serving as Acting Minister following Aryeh Deri's dismissal
32	Moshe Arbel	Shas	37	19 April 2023	12 October 2023	
33	Uriel Buso	Shas	37	12 October 2023	July 2025	
–	Benjamin Netanyahu	Likud	37	July 2025	July 2025	Serving as Acting Minister following Uriel Buso's resignation
34	Haim Katz	Likud	37	29 July 2025		

=== Deputy ministers ===
#	Minister	Party	Government	Term start	Term end	Notes
1	Yitzhak Rafael	National Religious Party	10, 11, 12	2 November 1961	22 March 1965	
2	Shlomo-Yisrael Ben-Meir	National Religious Party	12	24 March 1965	12 January 1966	
3	Abd el-Aziz el-Zoubi	Alignment	15	24 May 1971	10 March 1974	
4	Shoshana Arbeli-Almozlino	Alignment	21	24 September 1984	20 October 1986	
5	Eliezer Mizrahi	Agudat Yisrael; Geulat Yisrael	24	25 June 1990	13 July 1992	
6	Nawaf Massalha	Labor Party	25, 26	4 August 1992	18 June 1996	
7	Shlomo Benizri	Shas	27	13 August 1996	6 July 1999	
8	Ya'akov Litzman	United Torah Judaism	32	1 April 2009	18 March 2013	De facto minister (UTJ do not take full cabinet posts)
9	Tzachi Hanegbi	Likud	33	24 December 2014	14 May 2015	
–	Ya'akov Litzman	United Torah Judaism	34	19 May 2015	2 September 2015	De facto minister (UTJ do not take full cabinet posts)
–	Ya'akov Litzman	United Torah Judaism	34	10 January 2018	29 December 2019	
10	Yoav Kisch	Likud	35	25 May 2020	13 June 2021	

== See also ==
- Health care in Israel
- List of hospitals in Israel
