= Elimelekh Rimalt =

Israeli politician and Zionist activist

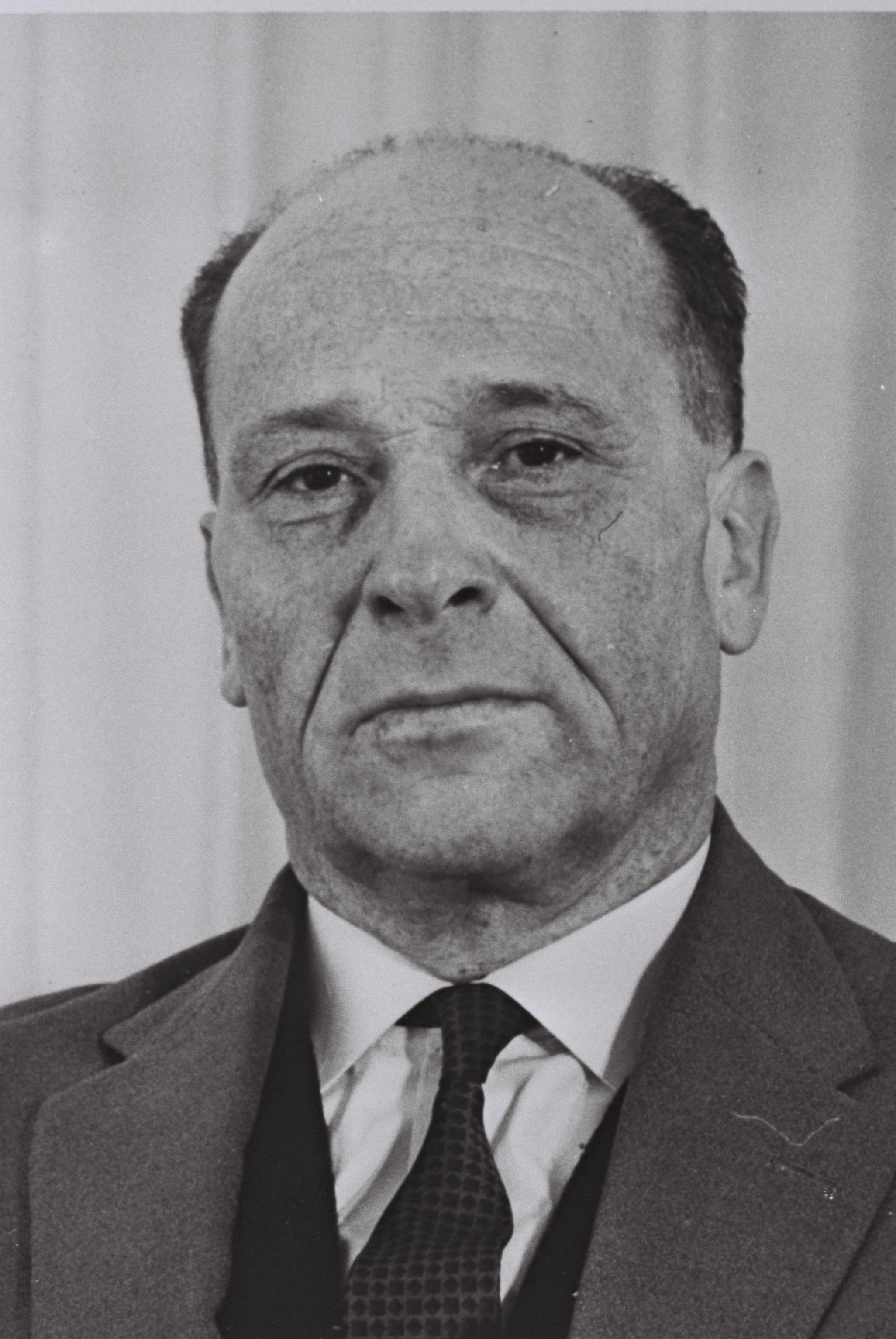
- Rimalt in 1969

Ministerial roles
- 1969–1970: Minister of Postal Services

Faction represented in the Knesset
- 1951–1961: General Zionists
- 1961–1965: Liberal Party
- 1965–1974: Gahal
- 1974–1977: Likud

Personal details
- Born: 1 November 1907 Bochnia, Austria-Hungary
- Died: 5 November 1987 (aged 80)

Elimelekh-Shimon Rimalt (Hebrew: אלימלך-שמעון רימלט; 1 November 1907 – 5 November 1987) was a Zionist activist and Israeli politician. He served as Minister of Postal Services between December 1969 and August 1970.

== Biography ==
Born in Bochnia in the Galicia area of Austria-Hungary, Rimalt studied at a heder and yeshiva, as well as a Hebrew high school in Kraków. While living in Poland he was one of the founders of the Akiva Hebrew Youth Organisation. He went on to study at a rabbinical seminary in Vienna, and gained a PhD in philosophy from the University of Vienna, where he was chairman of the Zionist Students Group.

In 1939 he emigrated to Mandatory Palestine and worked as headmaster of a school in Ramat Gan. In 1943 he was appointed director of the city's department of education, serving until 1952.

In 1951 he was elected to the Knesset on the General Zionists list, and was also a member of Ramat Gan city council, serving as deputy mayor responsible for education between 1955 and 1959. In 1952 he became chairman of the General Zionist Labour Federation, a role he held until 1965. By that time the General Zionists had merged into the Liberal Party, which had become a faction within the Gahal alliance (later Likud); Rimalt was appointed chairman of the Liberal Party's directorate in 1965, having won re-election to the Knesset in 1955, 1959, 1961 and 1965.

Following the formation of a national unity government after the 1969 elections, Rimalt was appointed Minister of Postal Services. However, he left the cabinet in 1970 when Gahal withdrew from the coalition. The following year he became chairman of the Liberal Party, a role he held until 1975. He chose not to run for re-election in the 1977 elections, having been an MK for just under 26 years. He was considered a leading contender for the 1978 presidential election, but did not stand as a candidate.

Streets in Ramat Gan and Ra'anana are named after him.
