= Ezra Ichilov =

Israeli politician (1907–1961)

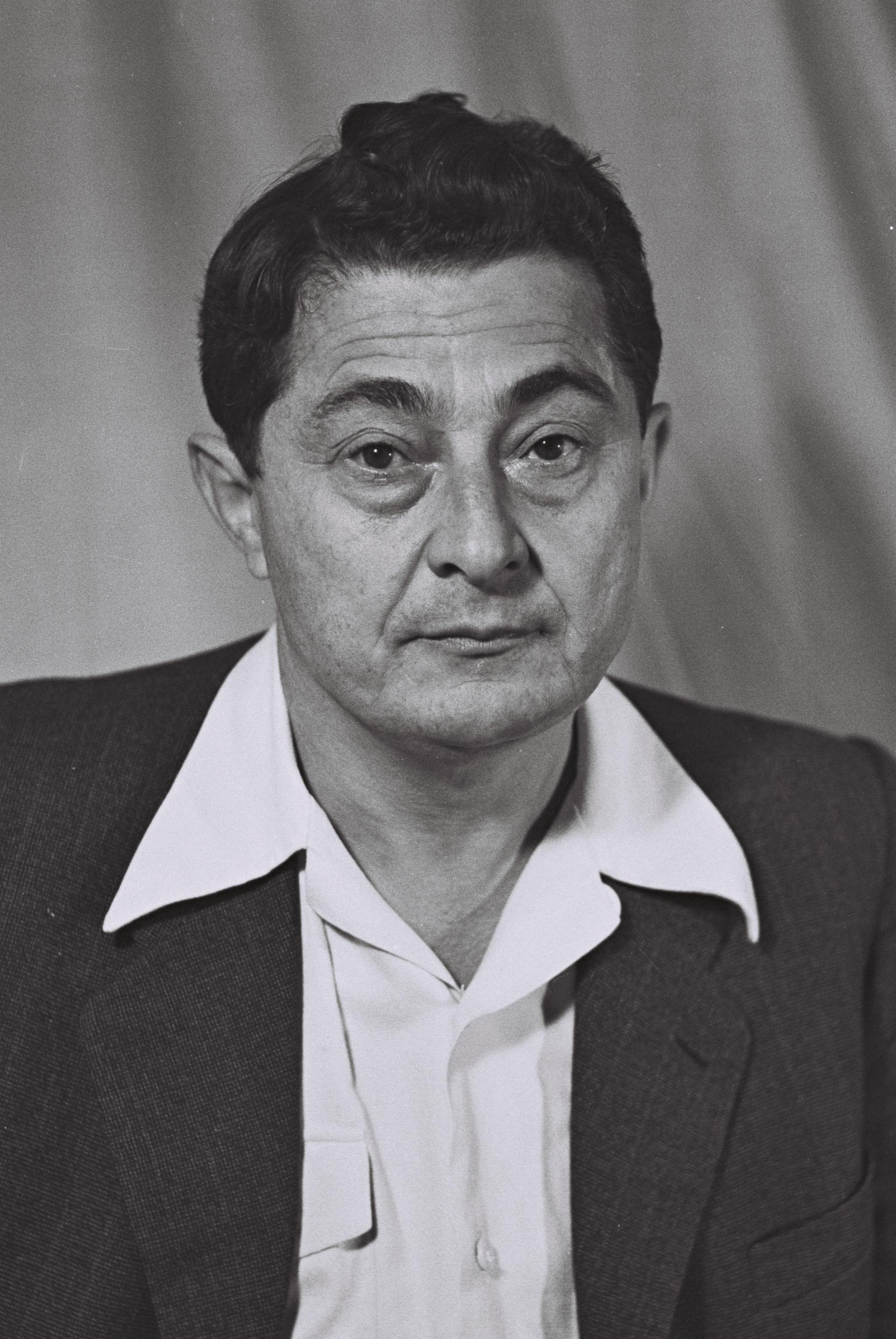
- Ichilov in 1951

Faction represented in the Knesset
- 1951–1961: General Zionists
- 1961: Liberal Party

Personal details
- Born: 10 June 1907 Petah Tikva, Ottoman Empire
- Died: 25 June 1961 (aged 54)

Ezra Ichilov (Hebrew: עזרא איכילוב; 10 June 1907 – 25 June 1961) was an Israeli politician who served as a member of the Knesset for the General Zionists and the Liberal Party between 1951 and 1961.

== Biography ==
Ichilov was born in Petah Tikva during the Ottoman era. He was a member of Maccabi and represented it at the nineteenth Zionist Congress. He was also a leader of Bnai Binyamin, an agricultural association and in 1932 was elected to the central committee of Hitahdut HaIkarim. In 1928 he was among the founders of the Eretz Israel/Palestine Football Association.

Between 1931 and 1955 he was a member of Petah Tikva city council. In 1948 he joined the General Zionists and was elected to the Knesset on the party's list in 1951. He was re-elected in 1955 and 1959, also representing the Liberal Party formed by the merger of the General Zionists and the Progressive Party. He died shortly before the 1961 elections at the age of 54.

Ichilov Hospital in Tel Aviv was named after his brother Moshe.
