= Yitzhak Klinghoffer =

Austrian lawyer (1905–1990)

- יצחק קלינגהופר
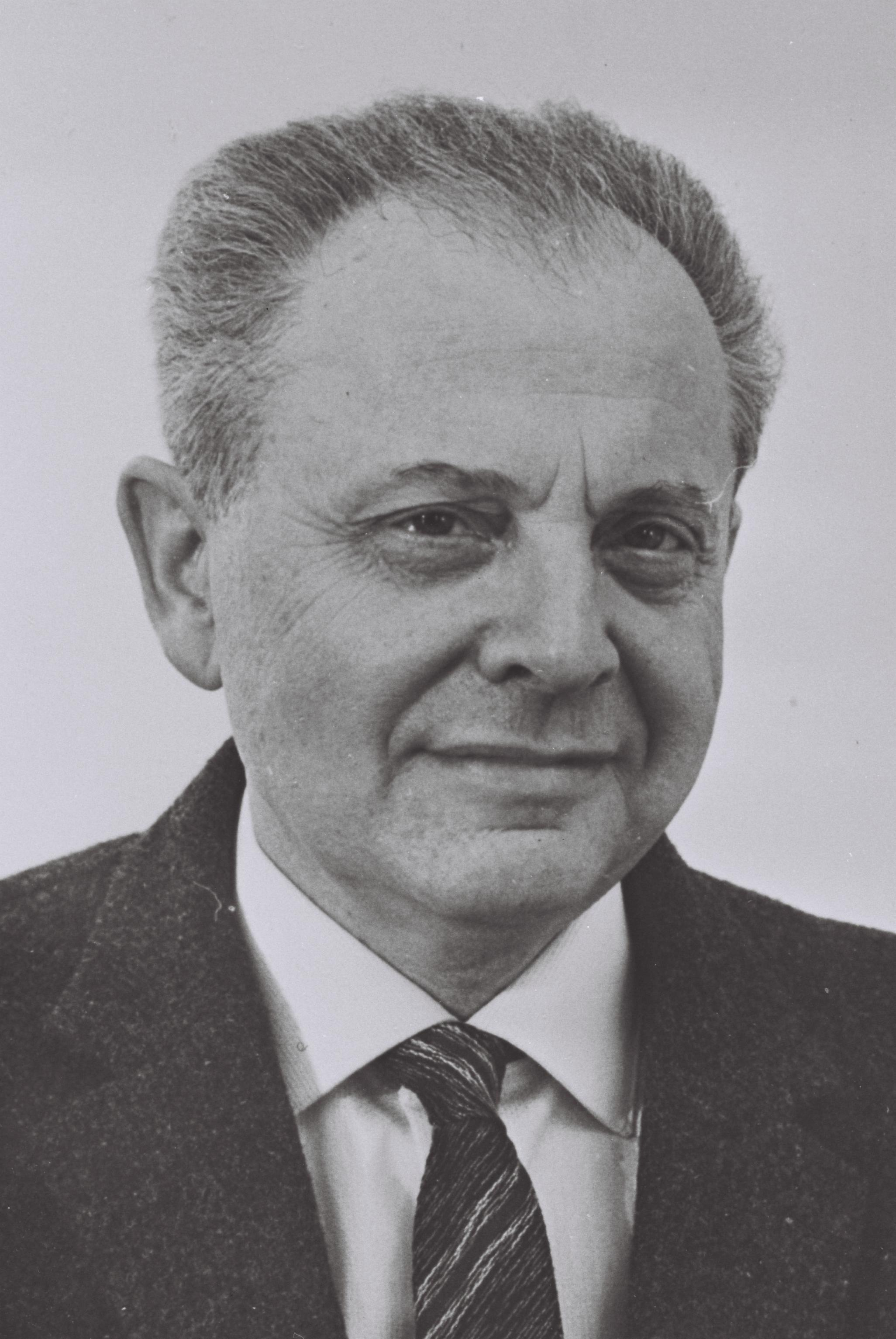

Faction represented in the Knesset
- 1961–1965: Liberal Party
- 1965–1974: Gahal

Personal details
- Born: 17 February 1905 Galicia, Austro-Hungary
- Died: 31 January 1990 (aged 84)

Yitzhak Hans Klinghoffer (Hebrew: יצחק הנס קלינגהופר; 17 February 1905 – 31 January 1990) was an Israeli jurist and politician.

== Biography ==
Hans (Yitzhak) Klinghoffer was born in Galicia (today in Poland), but grew up in Vienna. He studied Law and Political Science at the University of Vienna, where he received Doctorate in Law in 1927 and in Political Science in 1930.

When Germany annexed Austria he moved to France but in 1940 he was forced to move again, this time to Brazil. In Brazil he was Science Advisor to the American Delegate in the International Jurisprudence Convention in Rio de Janeiro from 1946 to 1948 and Legal Advisor to the Austrian Embassy in Brazil between 1948 and 1953.

In 1953, Klinghoffer immigrated to Israel and was appointed to the Law Faculty of the Hebrew University of Jerusalem, where he was Senior Lecturer (1953–1954), Associate Professor (1957–1968), Dean of Law Faculty (1959–1961) and Tenured Professor (1968–1974). He was Legal Advisor to the Comptroller of the Defense Establishment in the years 1975–1976. He was also President of the Association for Civil Rights in Israel from 1976 to 1982.

== Political career ==
In 1961, Klinghoffer helped to found the Liberal Party and was elected to the 5th Knesset. The party later merged with Herut to form Gahal, which he represented in the Sixth and Seventh Knesset.

Klinghoffer is known for his contributions to Israeli Constitutional and Administrative Law. In 1964 he proposed to the Knesset an extensive Bill of Rights Act. Although it was turned down, it influenced later Basic Laws of Israel, especially Basic Law: Human Dignity and Liberty.
