= Shabtai Shikhman =

Israeli politician

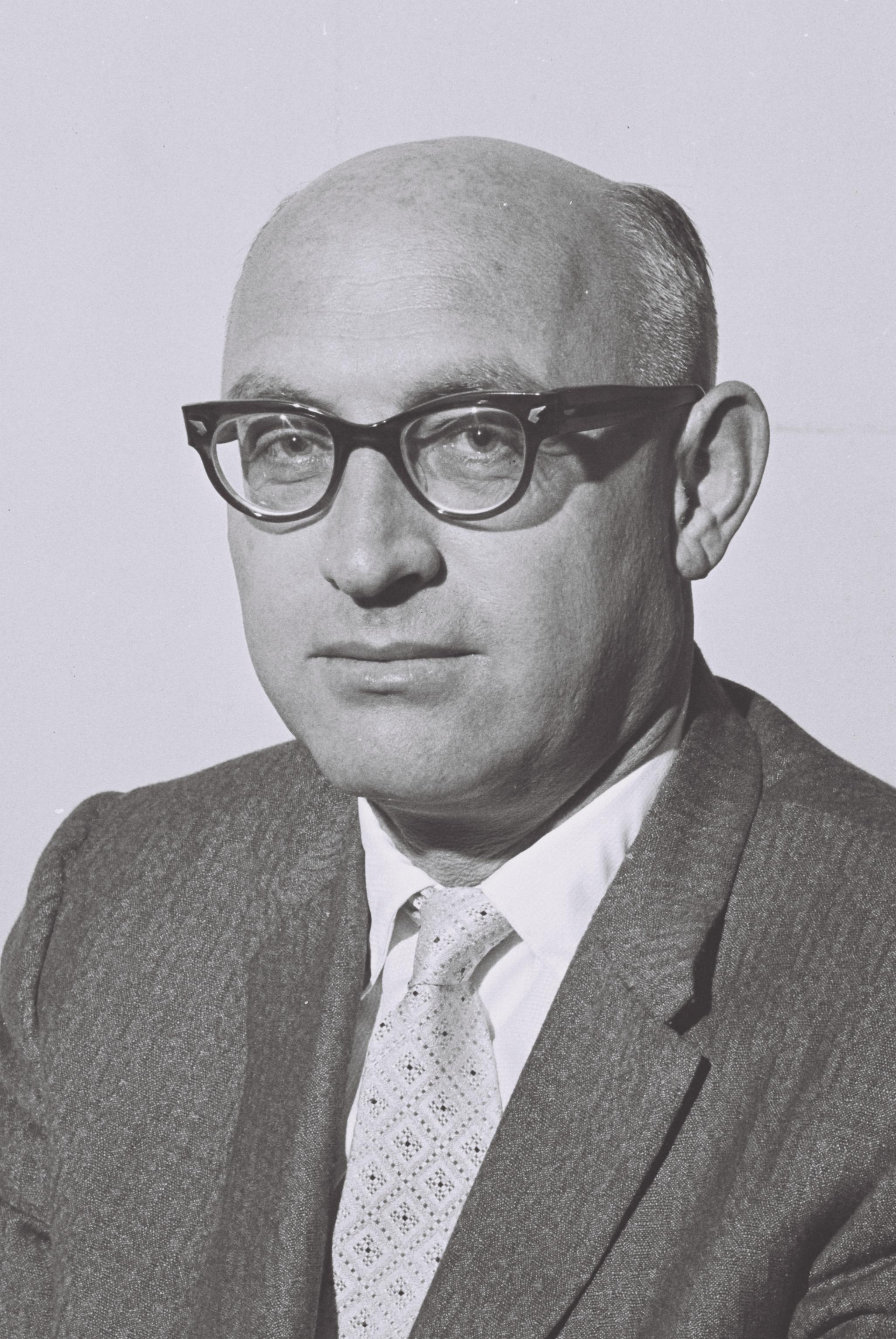
- Shikhman in 1959

Faction represented in the Knesset
- 1959–1965: Herut
- 1965: Gahal

Personal details
- Born: 10 September 1915
- Died: 9 January 1987 (aged 71)

Shabtai Shikhman (Hebrew: שבתאי שיכמן; 10 September 1915 – 9 January 1987) was an Israeli politician who served as a member of the Knesset for Herut and Gahal between 1959 and 1965.

== Biography ==
Born in an area that became Poland, Shikhman joined the Betar youth movement, and was commander of the branch in his home town. He joined the local branch of Hatzohar, and served as the local branch's deputy chairman.

In 1935 he emigrated to Mandatory Palestine, where he served as secretary of HaOved HaLeumi until 1941. In 1949 he founded the Sela housing company and worked as its general manager.

In 1959 he was elected to the Knesset on the Herut list. He was re-elected in 1961, but lost his seat in the 1965 elections, shortly before which Herut had formed the Gahal alliance.

He died in 1987 at the age of 71.
