= Shimon Kanovitch =

Israeli physician and politician

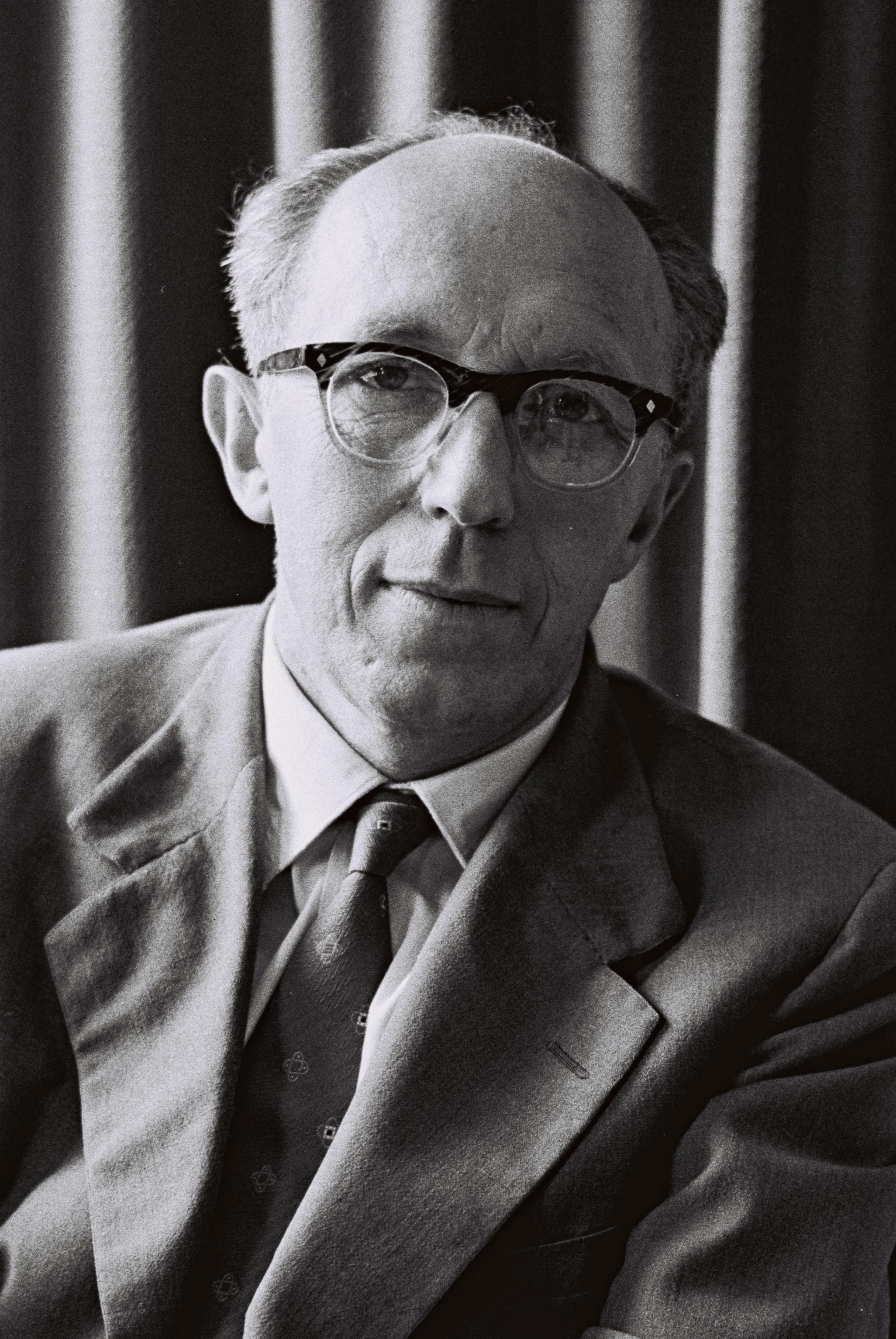
- Kanovitch in 1959

Faction represented in the Knesset
- 1959–1961: Progressive Party
- 1961: Liberal Party

Personal details
- Born: 6 July 1900 Germany
- Died: 25 July 1961 (aged 61)

Dr Shimon Kanovitch (Hebrew: שמעון כנוביץ'; 6 July 1900 – 25 July 1961) was an Israeli physician and politician who served as a member of the Knesset for the Progressive Party and Liberal Party between 1959 and 1961.

== Biography ==
Born in Germany in 1900, Kanovitch studied medicine at university in Königsberg, Frankfurt and Tübingen, and was certified as a paediatrician. During his youth he joined the Zionist Movement and Zionist student organisations, and later became secretary of the Zionist Federation in Germany.

In 1933 he emigrated to Mandatory Palestine, where he became a lecturer at the medical school in Jerusalem, and also in educational psychology at the Kibbutz Seminary. He was amongst the founders of the New Aliyah Party in 1942, which later formed the basis of the Progressive Party. He was elected to the Knesset on the Progressive Party's list in 1959, but lost his seat in the 1961 elections, by which time the party had merged into the Liberal Party.

He died later in 1961 at the age of 61.
