= Mordechai Ofer =

Israeli politician (1924–1971)

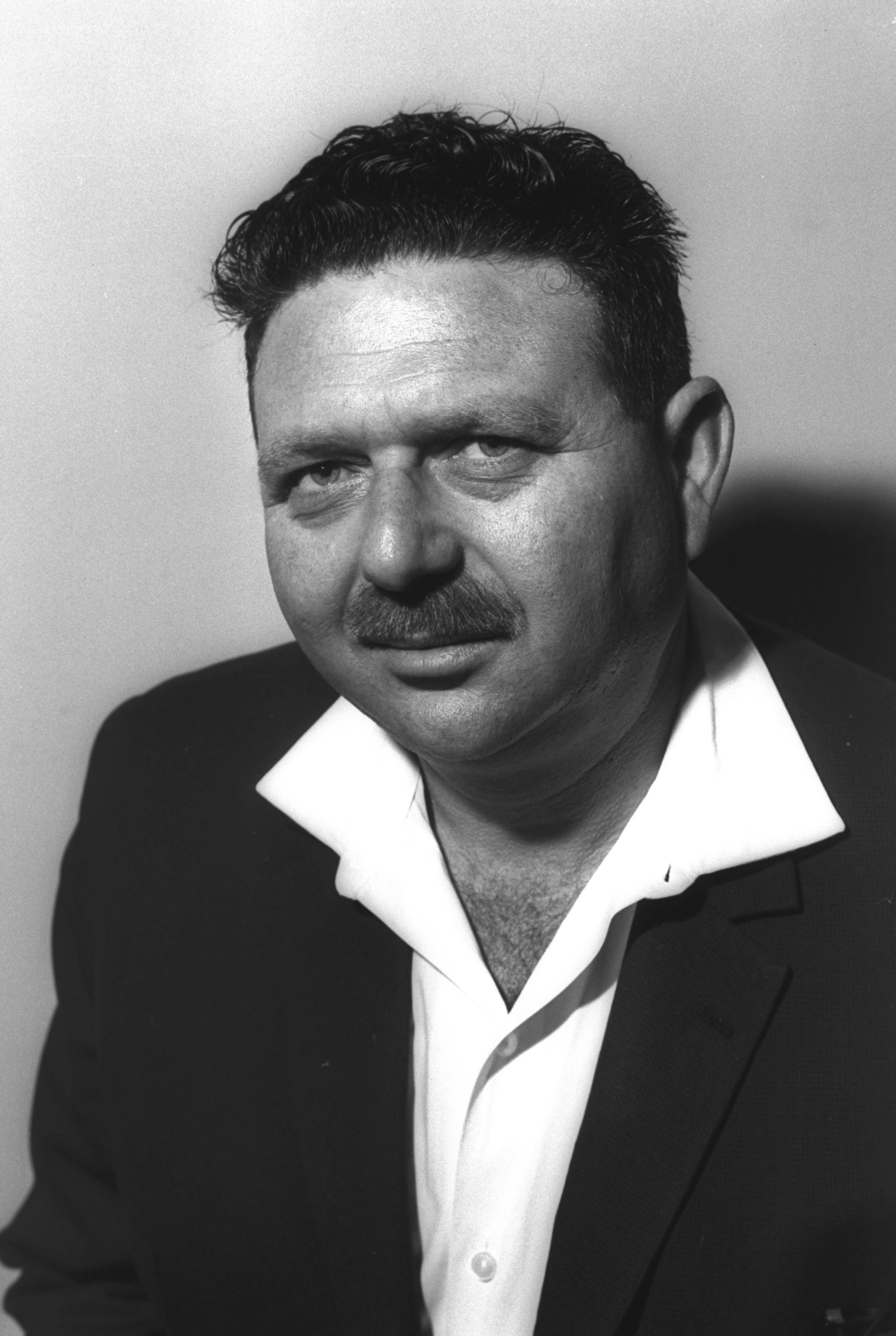
- Ofer in 1966

Faction represented in the Knesset
- 1965-1968: Alignment
- 1968–1969: Labor Party
- 1969–1971: Alignment

Personal details
- Born: 20 February 1924; Kraków, Poland
- Died: 1 September 1971 (aged 47)

Mordechai Ofer (Hebrew: מרדכי עופר; 20 February 1924 – 1 September 1971) was an Israeli politician who served as a member of the Knesset for the Alignment and Labor Party from 1965 until his death in 1971.

== Biography ==
Born in Kraków in Poland in 1924, Ofer emigrated to Mandatory Palestine the following year. He joined the Mandate-era Jewish Police force and served in the IDF during the 1948 Arab-Israeli War.

After being demobilized in 1950 with the rank of Lieutenant Colonel, he began working for Egged. He became a member of the co-operative's board, and from 1961 until his death, served as director of its Finances department.

In 1965 he was elected to the Knesset on the Alignment list. He was re-elected in 1969 but died in office in September 1971 at the age of 47. His seat was taken by Moshe Shahal.
