= Zalman Susayeff =

Israeli politician (1911–1981)

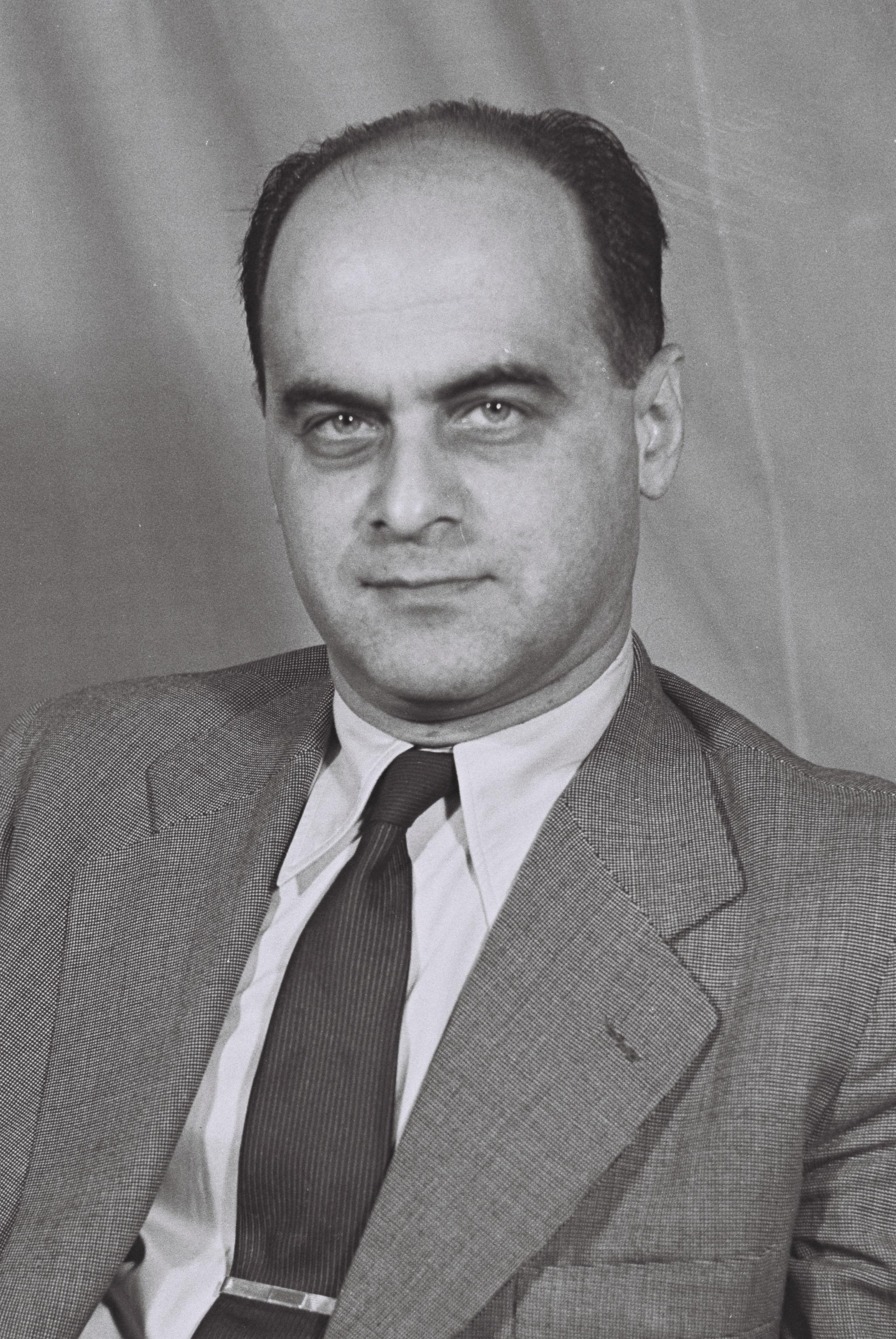
- Susayeff in 1951

Faction represented in the Knesset
- 1951–1959: General Zionists

Personal details
- Born: 14 February 1911 Riga, Russian Empire
- Died: 25 February 1981 (aged 70)

Zalman Susayeff (Hebrew: זלמן סוזאיב; 14 February 1911 – 25 February 1981) was an Israeli businessman and politician who served as a member of the Knesset for the General Zionists between 1951 and 1959.

== Biography ==
Born in Riga in the Russian Empire (today in Latvia), Susayeff studied at the University of Riga, where he was one of the leaders of the Hasmonean Union.

In 1935 he emigrated to Mandatory Palestine, where he worked in the wholesale import business. Between 1949 and 1950 he was president of Israel Association of Importers and Wholesalers, and from 1950 until 1952 was president of the Tel Aviv Chamber of Commerce.

A member of the General Zionists' directorate, he was elected to the Knesset on the party's list in 1951. On 15 June 1953 he was appointed Deputy Minister of Trade and Industry, a role he remained in until 29 June 1955. He was re-elected in July 1955, but lost his seat in the 1959 elections.

Between 1965 and 1969 he served as president of the Industrialists Association, and in 1969 became chairman of Public Council for War Bonds. He died in 1981 at the age of 70.
