= Israeli Liberal Party =

Israeli Liberal Party המפלגה הליברלית הישראלית
- Chairperson: Pinchas Rosen (1961−65); Peretz Bernstein (1961−65); Yosef Serlin (1965−71); Yosef Sapir (1965−72); Elimelekh Rimalt (1971−75); Simha Erlich (1976−83); Pinchas Goldstein (1983−88)
- Founded: 8 May 1961
- Dissolved: 1988
- Merger of: General Zionists, Progressive Party
- Merged into: Likud
- Headquarters: Tel Aviv
- Ideology: Liberalism (Israeli); Liberal Zionism
- Political position: Centre-right
- National affiliation: Gahal (1965−1973); Likud (1973−1988)
- International affiliation: Liberal International
- Colours: Gold
- Most MKs: 18 (1981)
- Fewest MKs: 11 (1965, 1969)

Election symbol

The Israeli Liberal Party (Hebrew: המפלגה הליברלית הישראלית, romanized: HaMiflaga HaLiberalit Yisraelit), also known as the Liberal Party in Israel (Hebrew: המפלגה הליברלית בישראל, HaMiflaga HaLiberalit BeYisrael) was a political party in Israel and one of the forerunners of the modern-day Likud. The party was created by a 1961 merger between the centrist Progressive Party and the General Zionists, forming a right-leaning, middle class-based party. The Progressives soon seceded to form the Independent Liberals in 1964.

== History ==
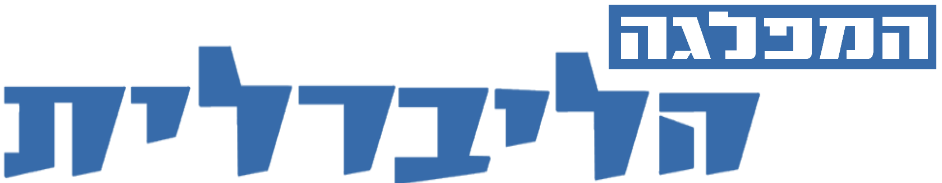
Another logo of the party

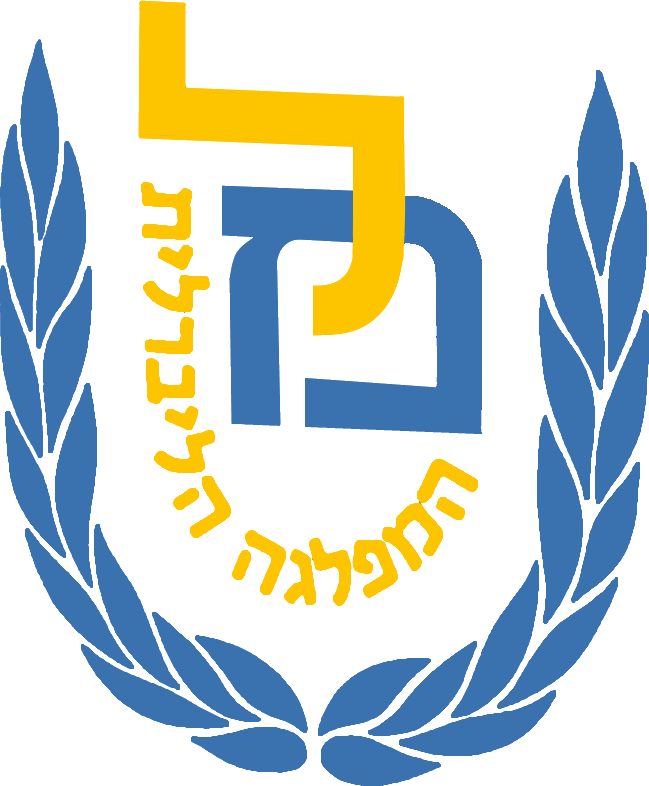
Logo of the Israeli Liberal Party during the early 1980's

The Liberal Party had its roots in the General Zionists, centrists who sought to unify all Zionists without regard to socialist, revisionist, or religious leanings, and stressed industrial development and private enterprise. The group split into two wings in 1935: the majority, General Zionists A, led by Chaim Weizman, were on the left; General Zionists B were on the right. Both were made up of industrialists, merchants, landlords, white-collar professionals, and intellectuals. They merged again in 1946 to form the General Zionist party, but split again in 1948 when group A helped form the Progressive Party.

The Liberal Party was formed on 8 May 1961, towards the end of the fourth Knesset when the two parties merged again, together holding 14 Knesset seats. Early elections were called for 1961 after the General Zionists and Herut brought a motion of no-confidence in the government over the Lavon Affair. In the 1961 elections the party won 17 seats, the same number as Herut, making it the joint-second largest after David Ben-Gurion's Mapai.

Early in 1964, spontaneous appeals arose among centrists and rightists of all factions for a joint parliamentary bloc to undermine Mapai's dominance. In 1965 the party held discussions with Menachem Begin's Herut party over a possible merger. A majority of the Liberals and Herut quickly approved the scheme, but some MKs, representing almost all the Progressive wing, declined to join the new alliance as they found Herut to be too militant. Seven mostly former Progressive Party MKs led by Pinchas Rosen broke away in protest to form the Independent Liberals on 16 March 1965. On 25 May 1965, the Liberal Party merged with Herut to form Gahal, a Hebrew acronym for Herut–Liberals Bloc (Hebrew: גוש חרות–ליברלים, Gush Herut–Libralim), though the two parties continued to function as independent factions within the alliance.

The formation of Gahal was a major turning point in Israeli politics, as it marked the first serious challenge to Mapai's hegemony. By the end of the Knesset session Gahal had 27 seats, only seven less than Mapai's 34 (reduced from 42 after 8 MKs, led by Ben-Gurion, had broken away to form Rafi).

Prior to the 1973 elections, Gahal merged with a number of small right-wing parties including the Free Centre (a breakaway from Gahal), the National List and the non-parliamentary Movement for Greater Israel to form the Likud bloc. The new party made history when it removed the left wing from power by winning the 1977 elections. The Liberal Party finally ceased to exist in 1988 when Likud became a unitary party.

In 1986, prominent Liberal Party leaders (none of whom were in the Knesset) who opposed joining the Likud established a party called the Liberal Center, accusing the present leadership of abandoning the party's traditional policies in order to accommodate Herut. The party was moderate in foreign policy; at the time it supported giving up of parts of the West Bank to Jordan in a peace treaty. It had a right-of-center approach to economic and social policies. In 1988, along with the Independent Liberals, it joined Shinui, forming the Center–Shinui Movement. The new bloc supported land for peace with the Arabs and the protection of individual rights, and opposed religious coercion. It was openly against joining a government led by Likud and the religious parties. It also differed from Labor in its support for a free-market economy.

Today, a remnant of the Liberal Party, the Israeli Liberal Group, remains an active member of Liberal International, which it joined in 1990.

== Elected MKs in the Fifth Knesset ==
– Progressive – General Zionists

Name
1	Pinchas Rosen
2	Peretz Bernstein
3	Yosef Sapir
4	Moshe Kol
5	Yizhar Harari
6	Yosef Serlin
7	Elimelekh Rimalt
8	Idov Cohen
9	Ezra Ichilov
10	Yitzhak Klinghoffer
11	Shimon Kanovitch
12	Yitzhak Golan
13	Rachel Cohen-Kagan
14	Zvi Zimmerman
15	Yehuda Sha'ari
16	Zalman Abramov
17	Baruch Uziel

== Leaders ==
Leader		Took office	Left office
1	Pinchas Rosen	1961	1965
2	Peretz Bernstein	1961	1965
3	Yosef Serlin	1965	1971
4	Yosef Sapir	1971	1972
5	Elimelekh Rimalt	1971	1975
6	Simha Erlich	1975	1983
7	Pinchas Goldstein	1983	1988

== Election results ==
Election	Votes	%	Seats	+/–	Leader
1961	137,255 (#3)	13.6	17 / 120	–	Pinchas Rosen; Peretz Bernstein
1965	Part of Gahal		11 / 120	▼6	Yosef Serlin
1969	Part of Gahal		11 / 120	0	Yosef Serlin
1973	Part of Likud		13 / 120	▲2	Elimelekh Rimalt
1977	Part of Likud		15 / 120	▲2	Simcha Erlich
1981	Part of Likud		18 / 120	▲3	Simcha Erlich
1984	Part of Likud		14 / 120	▼4	Pinchas Goldstein
