= Yosef Serlin =

Israeli politician

- יוסף סרלין
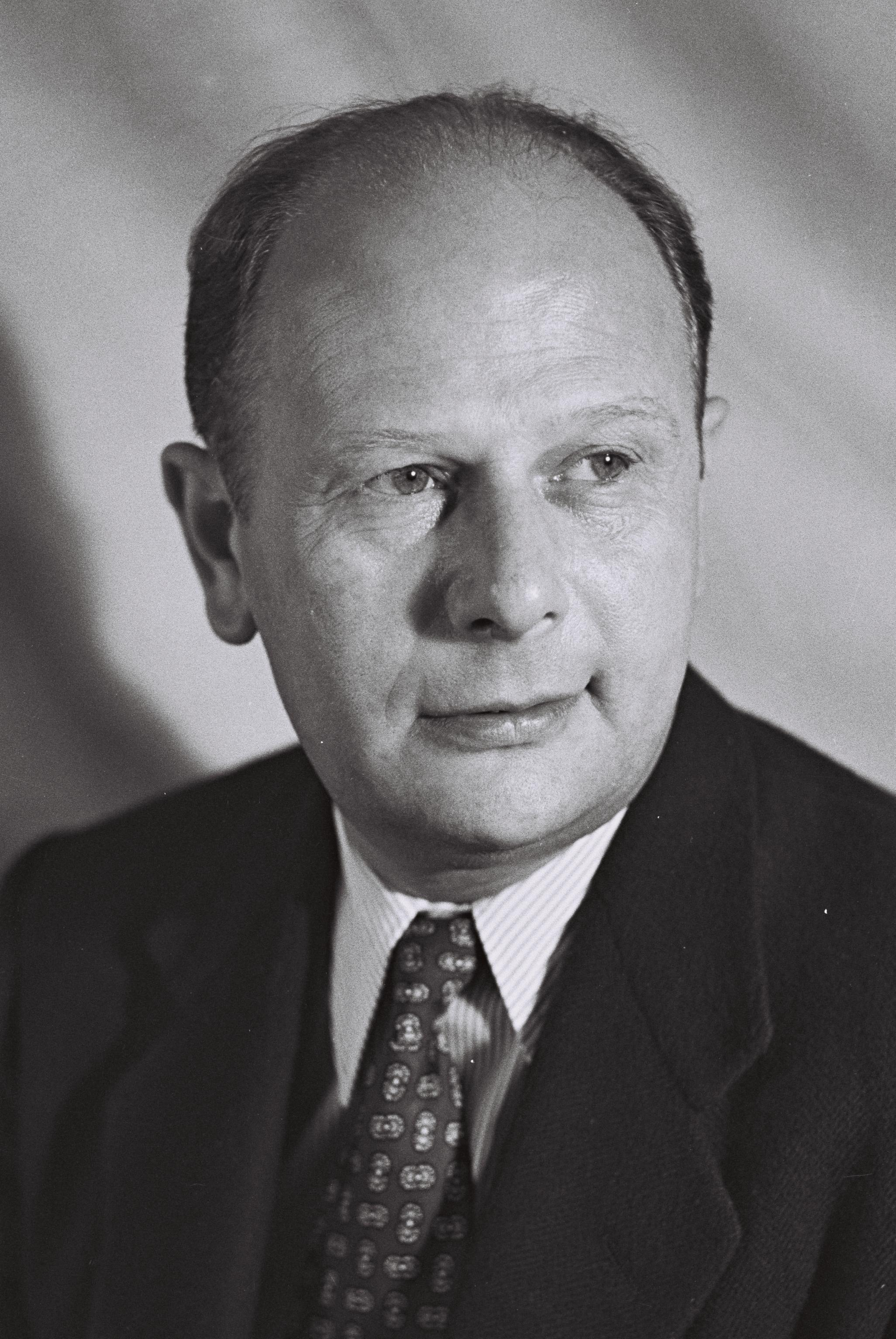

Ministerial roles
- 1952: Minister of Transportation
- 1952–1955: Minister of Health

Faction represented in the Knesset
- 1949–1961: General Zionists
- 1961–1965: Liberal Party
- 1965–1974: Gahal

Personal details
- Born: 24 January 1906; Białystok, Russian Empire
- Died: 15 January 1974 (aged 67)

Yosef Serlin (Hebrew: יוסף סרלין; 24 February 1906 – 15 January 1974) was a Zionist activist, lawyer and Israeli politician.

== Biography ==
Serlin was born in Białystok in the Russian Empire (now in Poland), where he attended a Hebrew High School. He studied law at the University of Warsaw and was certified as a lawyer in 1929. He was active in the Zionist Movement in Poland and was chairman of the Federation of Academic Zionists in Warsaw. He was made personal secretary to Nahum Sokolow in 1930. He was also a member of the Central Committee of Radical Zionists in Poland.

In 1933, he immigrated to the British Mandate of Palestine and worked as a lawyer in Tel Aviv. He was one of the founders of the General Zionists and later deputy chairman of the World Confederation of General Zionists Association. He was also a member of the Zionist Actions Committee.

After the establishment of the State of Israel in 1948, he sat on the Provisional State Council. He was then elected to the first through fourth Knessets as a member of the General Zionists. In 1954, he joined Yosef Sapir and Simha Erlich to tighten their grip on the party. However, he and Sapir had a falling out in 1957 and his standing in the party declined. In 1961, he joined the Liberal Party and represented it in the fifth Knesset. After the Liberal Party merged with Gahal, he served as an MK in the sixth and seventh Knessets. He was a member of the House, Labor, Constitution, Law and Justice, Economic Affairs, and Finance Committees. He was also deputy Speaker of the Knesset in the 5th and 6th Knesset.

In 1952, he served as Minister of Transportation and from 1952 as Minister of Health until 1955. He sought to strengthen the national control over the health system at the expense of the Israel's sick funds. He was a hawkish minister, and Moshe Sharett wrote in his diary that Serlin had asked him in 1954 to attack the Gaza Strip in reprisal to the Palestinian Fedayeen insurgencies. In 1958, he proposed a mixed election system, according to which most MKs were to be elected from thirty voting zones.

He died in 1974, streets in Tel Aviv and Holon are named after him.
