= Yosef Sapir =

Israeli politician

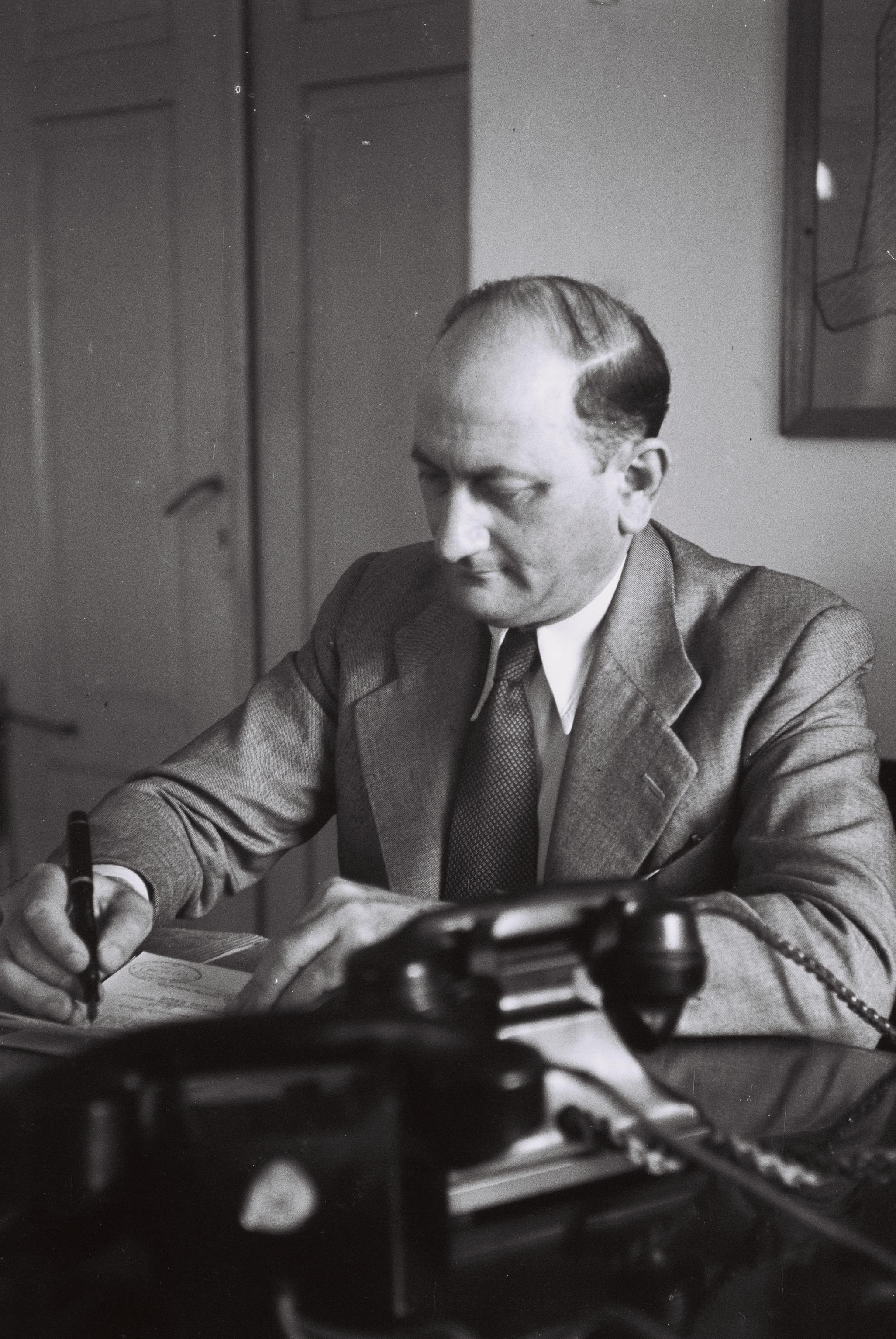

Ministerial roles
- 1952: Minister of Health
- 1952–1955: Minister of Transportation
- 1967–1969: Minister without Portfolio
- 1969–1970: Minister of Trade and Industry

Faction represented in the Knesset
- 1949–1961: General Zionists
- 1961–1965: Liberal Party
- 1965–1972: Gahal

Personal details
- Born: 27 January 1902 Jaffa, Ottoman Empire
- Died: 26 February 1972 (aged 70) Sydney, Australia

Yosef Sapir (Hebrew: יוֹסֵף סַפִּיר; January 27, 1902 – February 26, 1972) was an Israeli politician and Knesset member of the 1st to 7th Knessets. He served as head of the General Zionists and was a founding member of the Gahal party.

Sapir was born in Jaffa in 1902, then under the Ottoman Empire, into a family of citrus growers. His father, Jerusalem-born Eliyahu Sapir (1869-1911), had served as an educator in the first school in Petah Tikva, as well as the general manager of the main branch of the Bank Leumi in Jaffa. His grandfather, Rabbi Jacob Saphir (1822-1886), had come to Ottoman Palestine from Ashmyany in the Russian Empire (present-day Belarus) in 1832 with his family, and became a leading ethnographer and researcher of Hebrew manuscripts.

Between 1940 and 1951 he served as the mayor of Petah Tikva, where a major street (part of Road 481) is named after him. Shortly after his tenure, at the end of 1952, Sapir joined the national government as Health Minister, later going on to become the Minister of Transportation between 1952 and 1955.

Sapir served as a Minister without Portfolio in Levi Eshkol's emergency government formed on the eve of the Six-Day War. He assumed the post of Minister of Trade and Industry in Golda Meir's government, until Gahal left the coalition on 6 August 1970.

Sapir died while on assignment in Australia in 1972. He was buried in Segula Cemetery in Petah Tikva.

Karmei Yosef, a community settlement founded in 1984 between Ramle and Beit Shemesh, is named in his honor.
