= Gahal =

Herut–Liberals Bloc גוש חרות־ליברלים
- Chairperson: Menachem Begin
- Founded: 25 May 1965
- Dissolved: 1973
- Succeeded by: Likud
- Headquarters: Tel Aviv, Israel
- Ideology: Majority: Conservatism (Israeli); Revisionist Zionism; Factions: Liberalism (Israeli); Liberal Zionism
- Political position: Majority: Right-wing; Factions: Centre-right
- Member parties: Herut; Liberal Party
- Colours: Blue
- Most MKs: 27 (1961)
- Fewest MKs: 26 (1965, 1969)

Election symbol
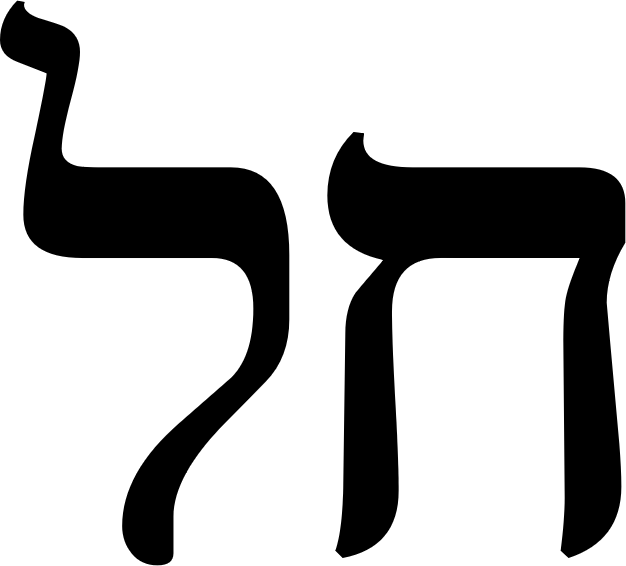

Gahal (Hebrew: גח״ל, an acronym for Gush Herut–Liberalim (Hebrew: גוש חרות־ליברלים), lit. Freedom–Liberals Bloc) was the main right-leaning political alliance in Israel, from its founding in 1965 until the establishment of Likud in 1973. It was led by Menachem Begin.

== History ==
Gahal was formed by an alliance of Herut and the Liberal Party towards the end of the fifth Knesset in preparation for the 1965 elections. The alliance brought together the only two right-wing parties in the Knesset, each with 17 seats at the time. The Liberal Party had only been formed in 1961, by a merger of the General Zionists and the Progressive Party. The Gahal platform largely incorporated Herut's approach to security and foreign affairs and the Liberal Party's approach to economics and finance. Though Gahal was led by Begin, Herut and the Liberals initially had nearly equal strength in the alliance.

However, several former Liberal Party members were unhappy with the alliance, identifying Herut and its leader, Menachem Begin, as too right-wing. As a result, seven MKs broke away from the Liberal Party to form the Independent Liberals, which later merged into the left-wing Alignment. Nevertheless, the new party went into the elections with 27 seats, just seven less than Mapai, the party that had dominated Israeli politics since independence, although Mapai also had been reduced in size due to a breakaway of eight MKs led by David Ben-Gurion to found Rafi.

Led by Begin, in its first electoral test Gahal won 26 seats. However, it was outperformed by the Alignment (a new left-wing alliance of Mapai and Ahdut HaAvoda) which won 46 seats. Gahal was reduced in strength when three of its MKs broke away to form the Free Centre, and a fourth later left.

During the Six-Day War, Alignment leader and Prime Minister Levi Eshkol invited Gahal to join a national unity government. The party remained in the government after the war, and kept its place when Golda Meir became Prime Minister following Eshkol's death in 1969.

In the October 1969 elections Gahal maintained its 26-seat strength, but was comprehensively beaten by the Alignment, which won 56, in the strongest-ever election performance in Israeli political history. Nevertheless, Gahal remained within the national unity government. The announcement of the Rogers Plan on 9 December had alarmed Menachem Begin sufficiently to cause the Herut faction to stop haggling with the Labor Party and accept the six cabinet seats offered in the new government. At the UN, a similar American proposal to Jordan on 18 December, explicitly calling for Israeli withdrawal from the West Bank, removed any remaining differences between Gahal and the Prime Minister, since they both saw this as a challenge requiring a blunt and energetic response. However, Gahal pulled out of the coalition in August 1970 after the government announced its support for the Rogers Plan. Although the government later retracted its support for the plan, Gahal did not rejoin the coalition.

Before the 1973 elections, Gahal and several smaller right-wing parties (including its former breakaway the Free Centre, the National List (a small party founded by David Ben-Gurion after he had left Rafi) and the non-parliamentary Movement for Greater Israel) to form a new alliance named Likud, the Hebrew word for 'consolidation'. Although Likud failed to overcome the Alignment in the 1973 elections, it comfortably won the next elections in 1977, ousting the left from power for the first time in Israel's history.

=== Composition ===
Name	Ideology	Position	Leader	Former MKs
Herut	National conservatism Revisionist Zionism	Right-wing to far-right	Menachem Begin	15 / 120
Israeli Liberal Party	Liberalism (Israli); Liberal Zionism	Centre-right	Peretz Bernstein; Yosef Serlin	11 / 120

== Electoral results ==
Election	Votes	%	Seats	+/–	Leader
1965	256,957 (#2)	21.3	26 / 120	–	Menachem Begin
1969	296,294 (#2)	21.7	26 / 120	Steady	Menachem Begin

== See also ==
- Politics of Israel
