= General Zionists =

General Zionists ציונים כלליים
- Leader: Meir Dizengoff; Israel Rokach; Peretz Bernstein; Yosef Sapir; Shoshana Persitz
- Founder: Yehoshua Sofersky
- Founded: 1922
- Dissolved: 8 May 1961
- Merged into: Liberal Party
- Headquarters: Tel Aviv
- Newspaper: HaBoker
- Ideology: Liberalism (Israeli); Liberal Zionism; Classical liberalism; Economic liberalism
- Political position: Pre-1948: Centre; 1948–1961: Centre-right
- Most MKs: 23 (1951)

Election symbol

The General Zionists (Hebrew: הַצִיּוֹנִים הַכְּלָלִיים, romanized: HaTzionim HaKlaliym) were a centrist Zionist movement and a political party in Israel. The General Zionists supported the leadership of Chaim Weizmann and their views were largely colored by central European culture. The party was considered to have both conservative and liberal wings, and is one of the ancestors of the modern-day Likud.

== History ==
The term "General Zionism" initially referred to the beliefs of the majority of members of the Zionist Organization (ZO) who had not joined a specific faction or party and belonged to their countrywide Zionist organizations only. The term was first used at the 1907 Zionist Congress to describe the delegates who were affiliated with neither Labor Zionism nor religious Zionism.

In 1922, various non-aligned groups and individuals established the Organization of General Zionists as a non-ideological party within the Zionist Organization (later the World Zionist Organization) at a time when the Zionist movement was becoming polarized between Labour Zionists and Revisionist Zionism. Eventually the General Zionists became identified with European liberal and middle class beliefs in private property and capitalism.

In 1929, the General Zionists established a world organization, holding their first conference in 1931. At this conference, rifts opened up between the conservative right wing and those who held more moderate views. They were divided over social issues, economics and labour issues (e.g. the Histadrut). The "General Zionists A" favored the economic policies of Labour Zionism and were supportive of Chaim Weizmann's compromising approach to relations with the British. The "General Zionists B" were skeptical of socialism and more outspoken against British policy in Palestine.

After the independence of the State of Israel, the gap between the two groups widened. The General Zionists A helped form the Progressive Party, which won five seats in 1949 Knesset elections and entered the Mapai-led governing coalition. The General Zionists B, running as the General Zionists, won seven seats and chose to remain in the opposition. In the years following the establishment of the state of Israel in 1948, the General Zionists moved towards the right in opposition to the hegemony of Mapai and other Labour Zionist movements in Israeli politics.

The General Zionist party supported private enterprise, the suspension of state support to collective institutions, and the termination of the Histadrut's control of the economy. However, it favored leaving the Histadrut with state control over several aspects of economy and welfare. It also supported a unified system of education (as it contributed to the passage of the 1953 State Education Law) and a written constitution to enshrine democratic freedom and civil rights. It was secularist, though not as vocally so as the Progressive Party.

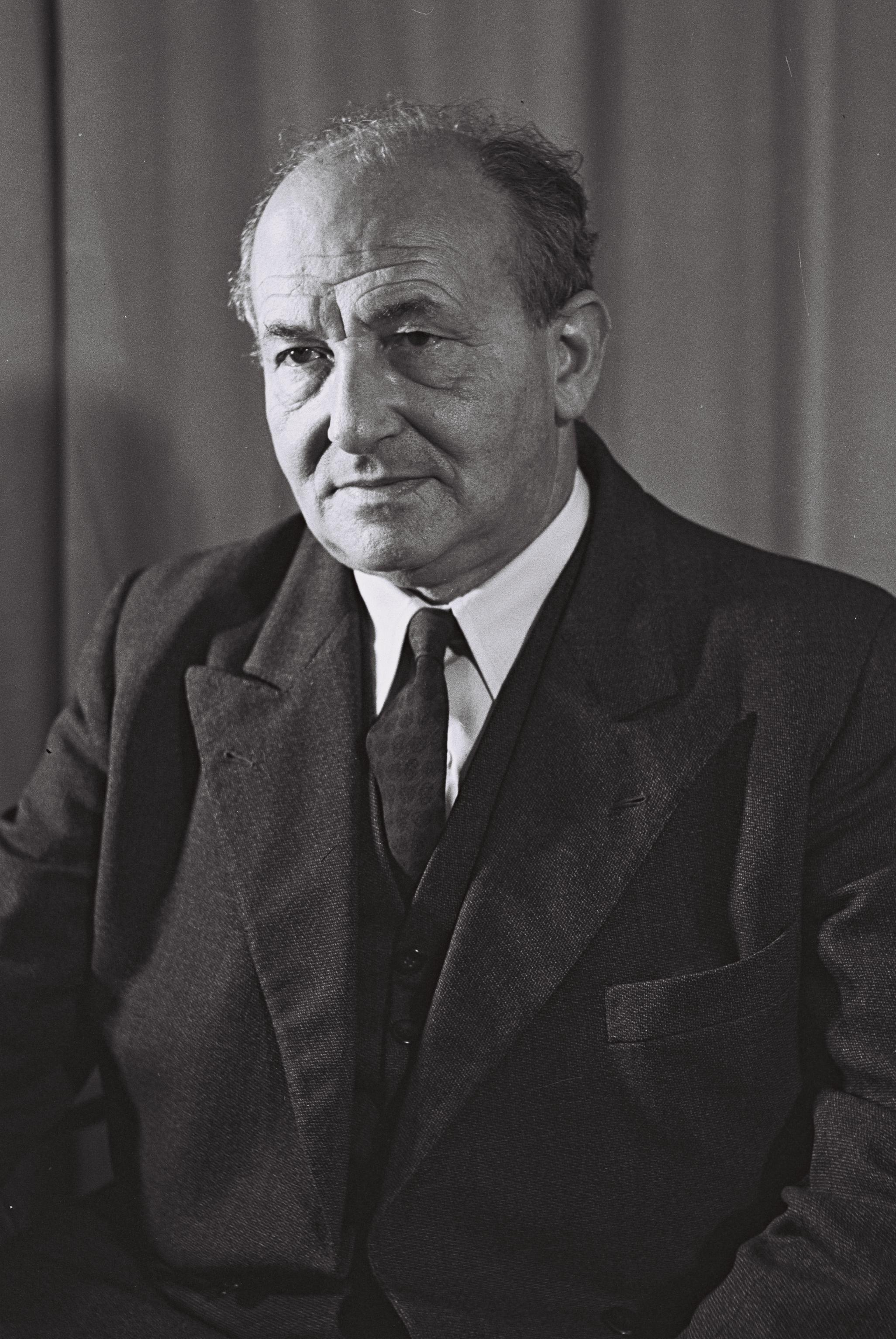
Peretz Bernstein

In 1936 the General Zionists established a daily newspaper, HaBoker, which was edited for the first ten years of its existence by Peretz Bernstein. It ceased publication in 1965.

== Political activity in Israel ==
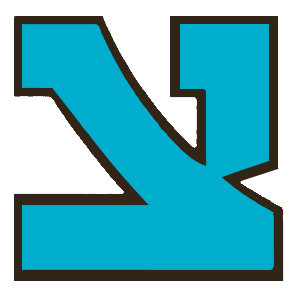
Another logo of the party

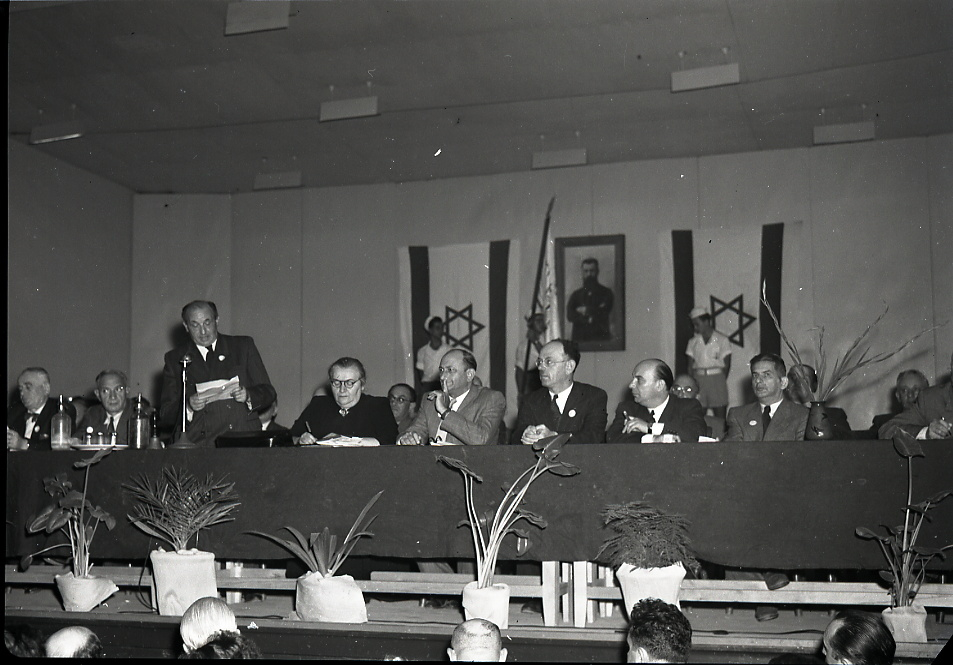
General Zionists party convention in 1949

The General Zionists entered the elections for the first Knesset in 1949. They won 5.2% of the vote and seven seats, and were not included in either of David Ben-Gurion's coalition governments.

The 1951 elections were a huge success, with the party winning 20 seats, making it the second largest in the Knesset. The party was enlarged soon after the elections when the Sephardim and Oriental Communities party and the Yemenite Association merged into it (though the one Yemenite Association MK left the party again before the end of the session). Although it was not included in the coalition for the third government, it was brought into the fourth government after Ben-Gurion had sacked the Ultra-orthodox parties, Agudat Yisrael and Poalei Agudat Yisrael, over the religious education dispute that had brought down the previous government. It was also included in Moshe Sharett's fifth government, but not the sixth.

In the 1955 elections the party slumped to 13 seats, and were not included in either of the third Knesset's coalition governments.

A further slump to eight seats in the 1959 elections and exclusion from the coalition made the party rethink its strategy. Eventually the party decided to merge with the 6-seat Progressive Party to form the Liberal Party. Nevertheless, the party helped bring down the government in 1961 when it and Herut tabled a motion of no confidence in the government over the Lavon Affair.

In the 1961 elections the new Israel Liberal Party won 17 seats, making it the third largest in the Knesset. During the session, ten MKs (mostly former General Zionists) merged with the right-wing Herut to form Gahal while the other seven (most from the Progressive Party) set up the Independent Liberals. Gahal later became Likud.

== Leaders ==
Leader		Took office	Left office
1	Peretz Bernstein	1949	1961
2	Israel Rokach	1949	1955
3	Yosef Sapir	1955	1961

== Election results ==
=== Assembly of Representatives elections ===
Election	Leader	Votes	%	Place	Seats won	+/−
1931	Peretz Bernstein	2,841	5.74	4th	5 / 71	new
1944	Peretz Bernstein	4,704	2.37	7th	4 / 173	

=== Knesset elections ===
Election	Leader	Votes	%	Place	Seats won	+/−
1949	Peretz Bernstein; Israel Rokach	22,661	5.2	5th	7 / 120	
1951	Peretz Bernstein; Israel Rokach	111,394	16.2	2nd	20 / 120	▲13
1955	Peretz Bernstein; Israel Rokach	87,099	10.2	3rd	13 / 120	▼7
1959	Peretz Bernstein; Yosef Sapir	59,700	6.2	5th	8 / 120	▼5
1961	Peretz Bernstein; Yosef Sapir	Part of the Liberal Party			7 / 120	▼1

== See also ==
- Liberalism in Israel
- Liberal Zionism
- Likud
