= Batsheva Katznelson =

Israeli politician (1897–1988)

Faction represented in the Knesset
- 1951–1955: General Zionists

Personal details
- Born: 1897 Bar, Russian Empire
- Died: 30 August 1988 (aged 90–91)

Batsheva Katznelson (Hebrew: בת-שבע כצנלסון; 1897 – 30 August 1988) was an Israeli politician who served as a member of the Knesset for the General Zionists between 1951 and 1955.

== Biography ==
Born in Bar in the Russian Empire (today in Ukraine), Katznelson emigrated to Ottoman-controlled Palestine in 1911, and attended Herzliya Hebrew High School in Tel Aviv. During World War I, she was expelled to Egypt by the Ottoman authorities. She later studied humanities at the University of Geneva. She worked as a teacher for 18 years.

One of the leader of the Organization of Hebrew Women, she attended the first Women's International Zionist Organization convention in 1926. She later became a member of WIZO's national committee, and chairwoman of the Jerusalem branch.

In 1951 she was elected to the Knesset on the General Zionists list, but lost her seat in the 1955 elections.

In 1918 Katznelson married Reuven Katznelson, becoming the sister-in-law of Rachel Katznelson-Shazar, wife of Zalman Shazar, the third president of Israel. Her children were the educator Shulamit Katznelson and Shmuel Tamir, who later served as a Knesset member from 1965 until 1981 and as Minister of Justice. She died in 1988.
