= Bar, Ukraine =

City in Vinnytsia Oblast, Ukraine

Bar Бар
- City
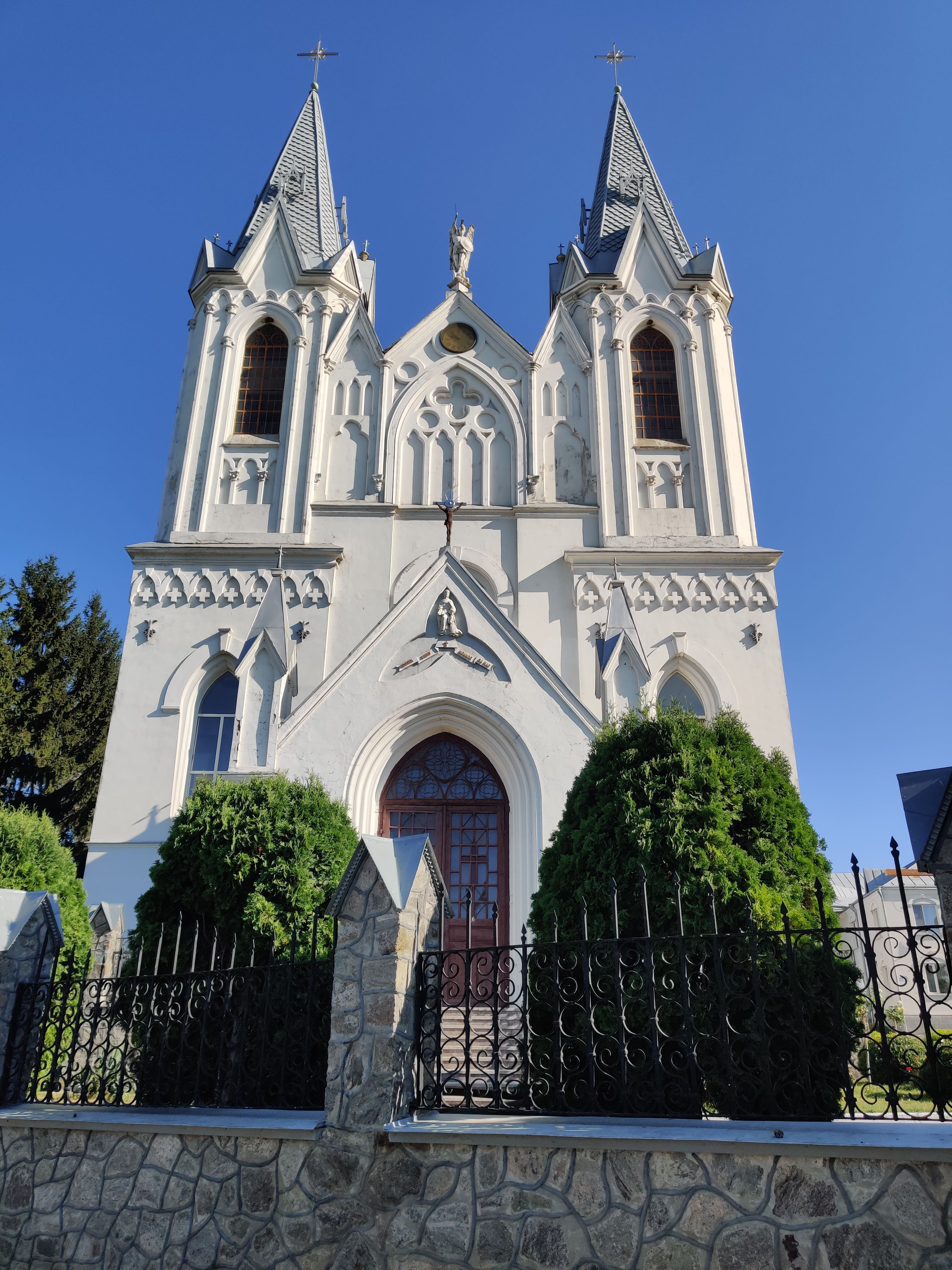
- The Saint Anne Church

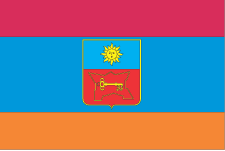
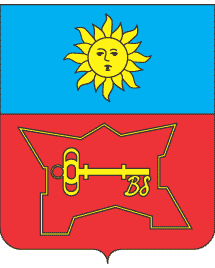
- Flag Coat of arms

- Location within Vinnytsia Oblast Location within Ukraine
- Coordinates: 49°04′30″N 27°40′34″E
- Country: Ukraine
- Oblast: Vinnytsia Oblast
- Raion: Zhmerynka Raion
- Hromada: Bar urban hromada
- First mentioned: 1401 (as Rov castle)
- Magdeburg law: 1540
- City rights: 1938
- Named for: Bari in Italy

Government
  - City Head: Artur Anatoliyovych Tsitsyurs'ky

Area
  - Total: 5.95 km^{2} (2.30 sq mi)

Population (2022)
  - Total: 15,337
  - Density: 2,580/km^{2} (6,680/sq mi)
- Time zone: UTC+2 (EET)
  - Summer (DST): UTC+3 (EEST)
- Postal code: 23000-23005
- Area code: +380-4341
- Sister cities: Kwidzyn in Poland, Bari in Italy
- Website: http://www.bar-city.gov.ua/

Bar (Ukrainian: Бар [bɑr]; Polish: Bar; Russian: Бар; Yiddish: באר) is a city located on the Riv River in Vinnytsia Oblast, central Ukraine. It is located in the historic region of Podolia. It served as the administrative center of the former Bar Raion until 2020. The city's estimated population is 13,202 (2023).

== History ==
=== Early history ===
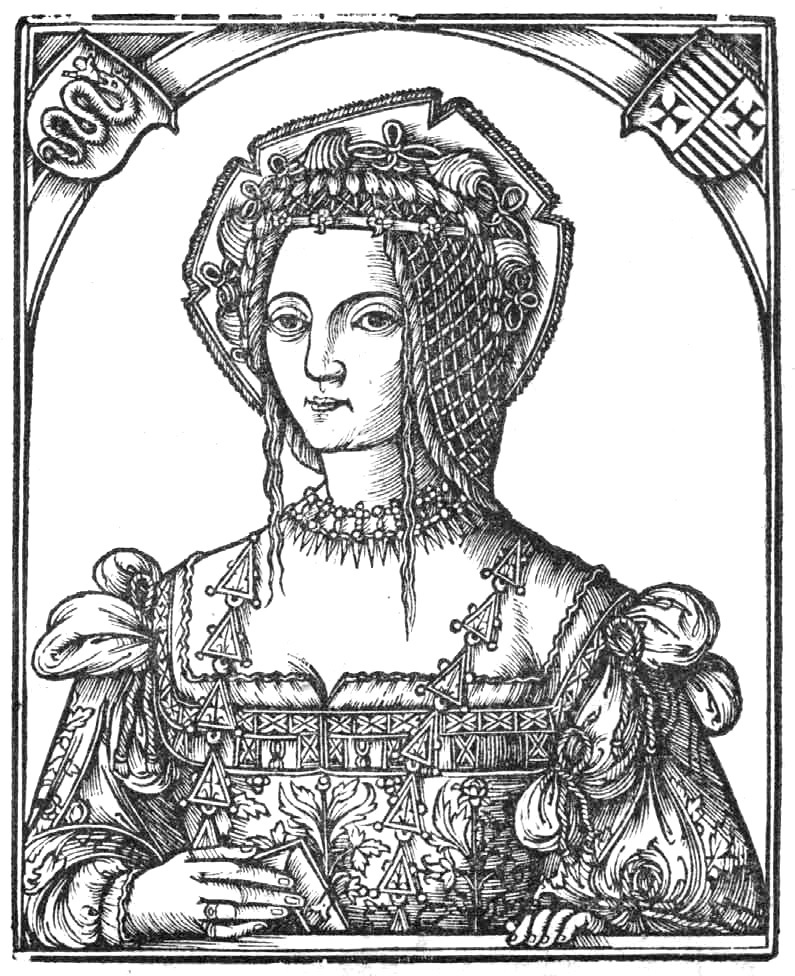
A 1517 engraving of Bona Sforza, the Polish Queen who gave Bar its name.

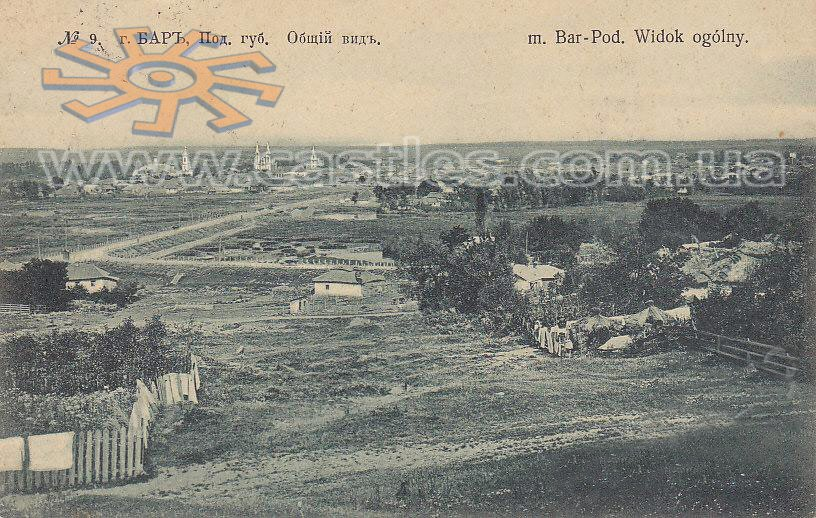
Old picture with a general view onto the city of Bar

Bar began as a small trade outpost known as Rov, within the Duchy of Podolia in the 13th century. Rov was noted for the first time in 1401. It was a fortified trading town located on the border between Poland and Turkey, which led to numerous wars in the area.

In 1537, the Polish Queen Bona Sforza renamed the settlement Bar, after her hometown of Bari, Italy. Bar's highest mountain was renamed after Queen Sforza in 2018 to commemorate her role in naming the town. In 1540, King Sigismund I the Old of Poland granted the nearby town city rights.

=== 17th century ===
In the 1630s, Guillaume Le Vasseur de Beauplan built a fortress in Bar and made note of the town in his book Description d'Ukranie.

The Bar fortress was besieged several times in its history. In 1648, during the Khmelnytsky Uprising, the fortress was captured by the Cossacks led by Maxym Kryvonis and was severely damaged.

Bar as a town was described by a number of travelers and historians, including Guillaume Le Vasseur de Beauplan in 1650, Evliya Çelebi in 1656, and Ulrich von Werdum in August 1671.

In 1672, Bar was captured by the Ottoman Empire and became a seat of the sanjak in Podolia Eyalet with nahiyas of Bar, Dırajna, Zinkuv and Popovçi. On November 12, 1674, the town and the fortress were liberated by John III of Poland after a four-day siege. However, the Ottomans would then recapture the city in 1675 and hold it until 1686, with nominal control through 1699.

=== 18th and 19th centuries ===
On February 29, 1768, the Bar Confederation, an alliance of Polish nobles, was founded by Adam Krasiński, Bishop of Kamenets, Karol Stanisław Radziwiłł, Casimir Pulaski, Moritz Benyowszki and Michał Krasiński within the Bar fortress. After the Second Partition of Poland, the town was ceded to the Russian Empire and made part of the Podolia Governorate. In 1838 the city's Basilian monastery was transferred to the Orthodox Church and became a female convent.

=== 20th century ===
During the early 20th century Bar declined, with its population decreasing from 10,500 in 1897 to 5,500 in 1937. In 1919-1920 the city was a site of battles between Ukrainian and Bolshevik troops, and housed the chief headquarters of Ukrainian Galician Army.

After 1922, Bar became part of Ukrainian Soviet Socialist Republic within the Soviet Union. Under the Soviet rule Bar served as a centre of food and machine building industries, and its surroundings were specialized in gardening.

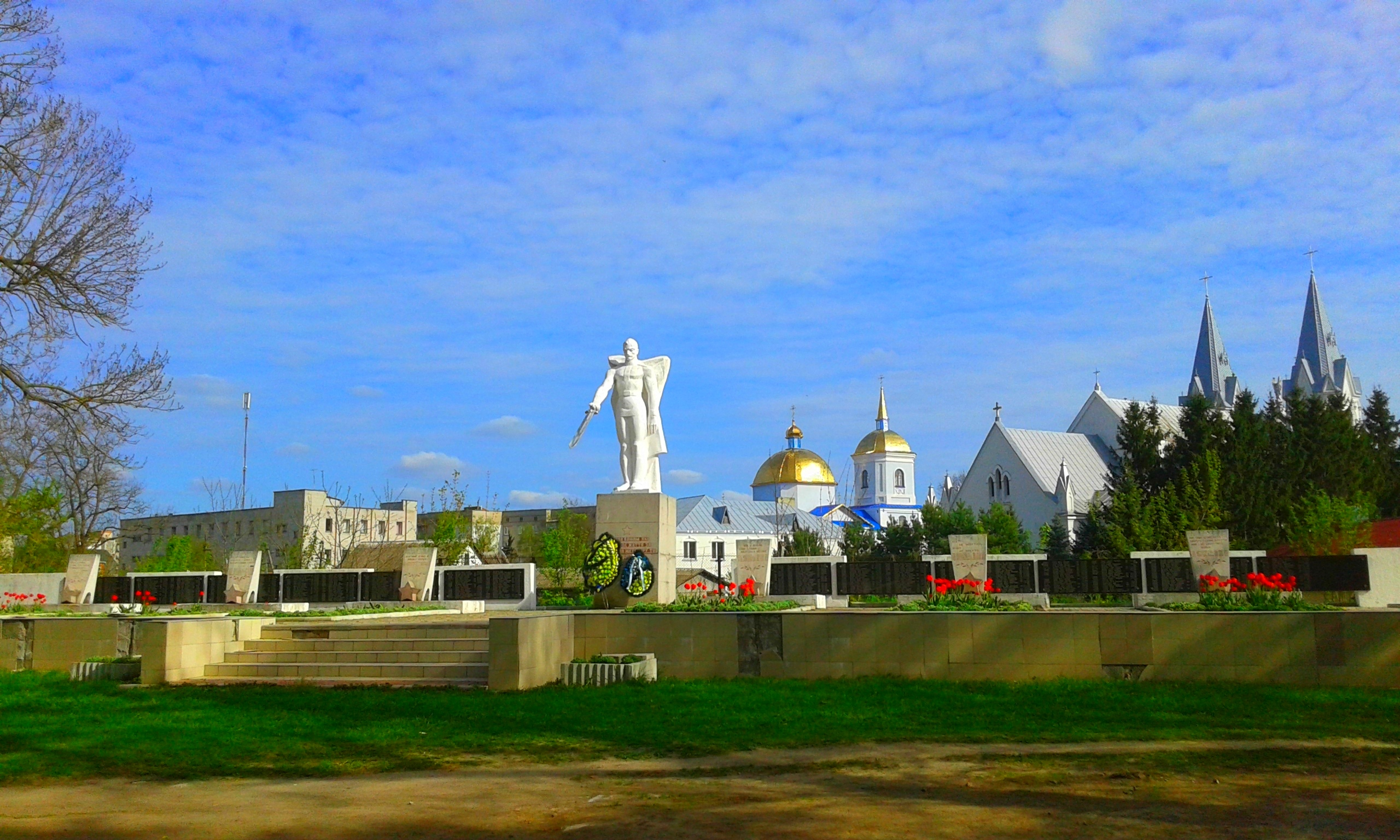
World War II Memorial

The town had a historical Jewish population, with 3,869 Jews within the city in 1939. On July 16, 1941, during World War II, Nazi Germany occupied the town and established ghettos, killing many of Bar's Jewish residents.

In 1991, following the fall of the Soviet Union, the town became part of the independent Ukraine. In 1999, there was an estimated Jewish population of 199. Bar currently has two large memorials situated within the city center, which are dedicated to those killed during WWII.

== Points of interest ==
=== City historic museum ===
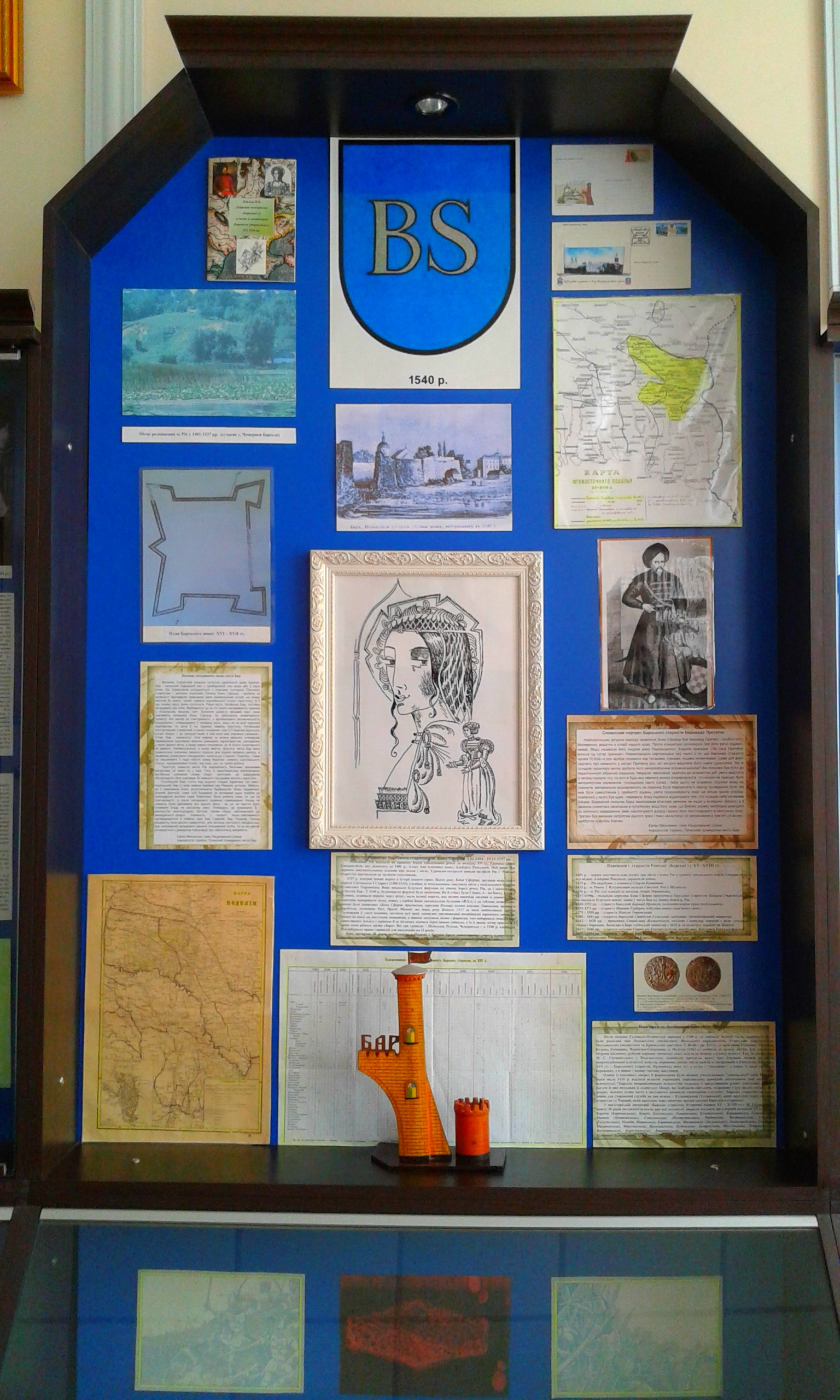
Original Coat of Arms at the History Museum in Bar

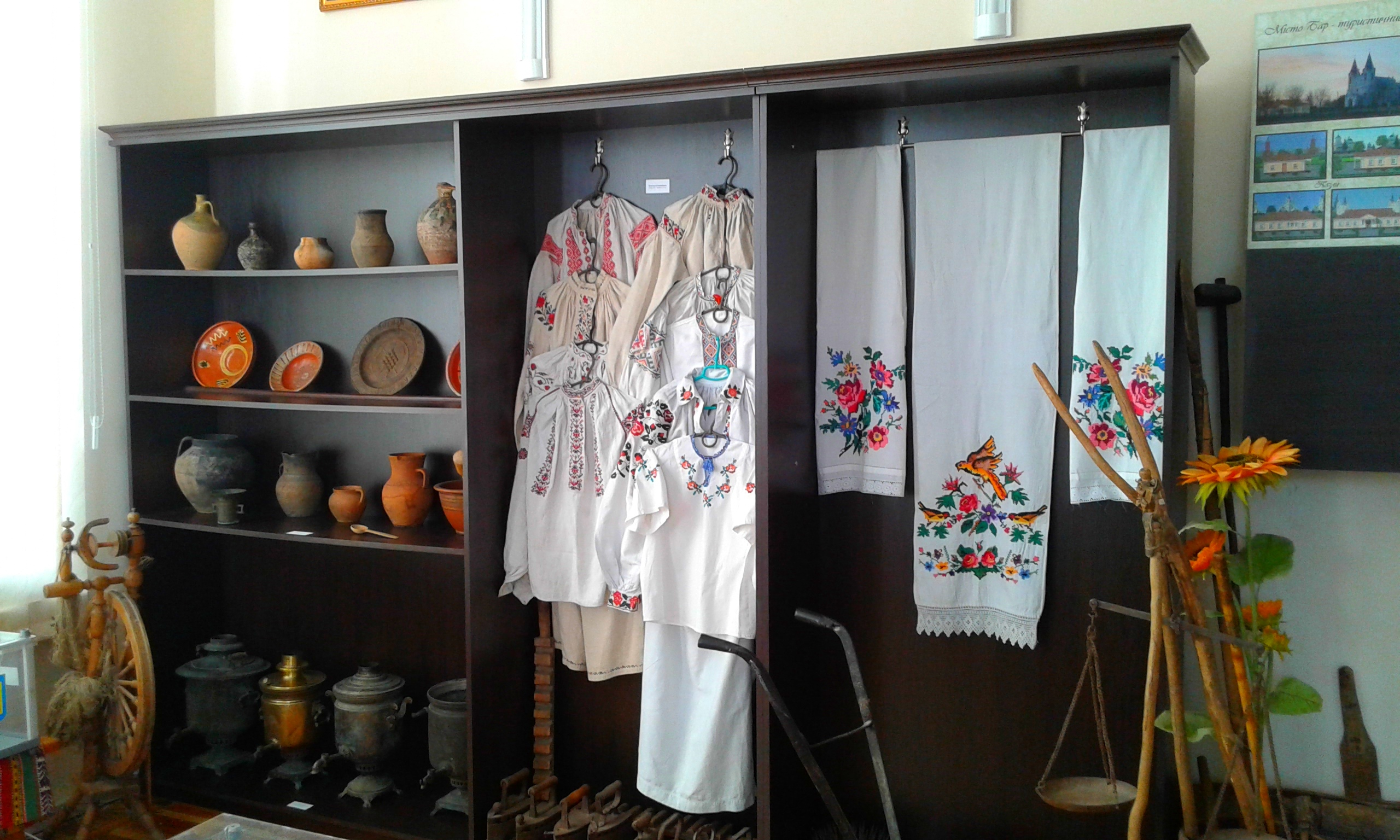
Ukrainian Culture Exhibition, History Museum

Bar has a museum which documents the city's history. The museum includes an exhibits on topics such as Queen Bona Sforza, Ukrainian culture, and the WWII era. It attracts both domestic and foreign visitors. The museum's collection includes historical clothing, ceramics, coins, and other artifacts.

=== Bar ceramics national museum ===
Bar has the Bar ceramics national museum. There is also a virtual exhibition with the 3D views on the Bar's ceramic authentic exhibits. The Bar's ceramics museum's contemporary exhibits collection is created by the potters and the collectioners from Bar, Ukraine. The museum has hosted scientific conferences, where research reports were presented with a goal to revive the Bar's ceramics in Bar, Ukraine. The Bar ceramics photographs have been presented at various visual art competitions. The Bar's ancient and modern ceramic products continue to be well known among the various private art collectioners, private/public museums and other ceramic items consumers in Ukraine and abroad. The Bar's ceramics exhibition was conducted in Vinnytsia in May, 2026. Recently, the Bar national ceramics museum presented its new extended exhibition in its new location at a modern office building in Bar, Ukraine. Recently, in course of "The Bar's Ceramics Traditions Revival Project V.4.0." under Mr. Roman Grygor'ev management, the multimedia audio-guide was created for tourists to learn more about the Bar city history.

=== Bar Fortress historic site ===
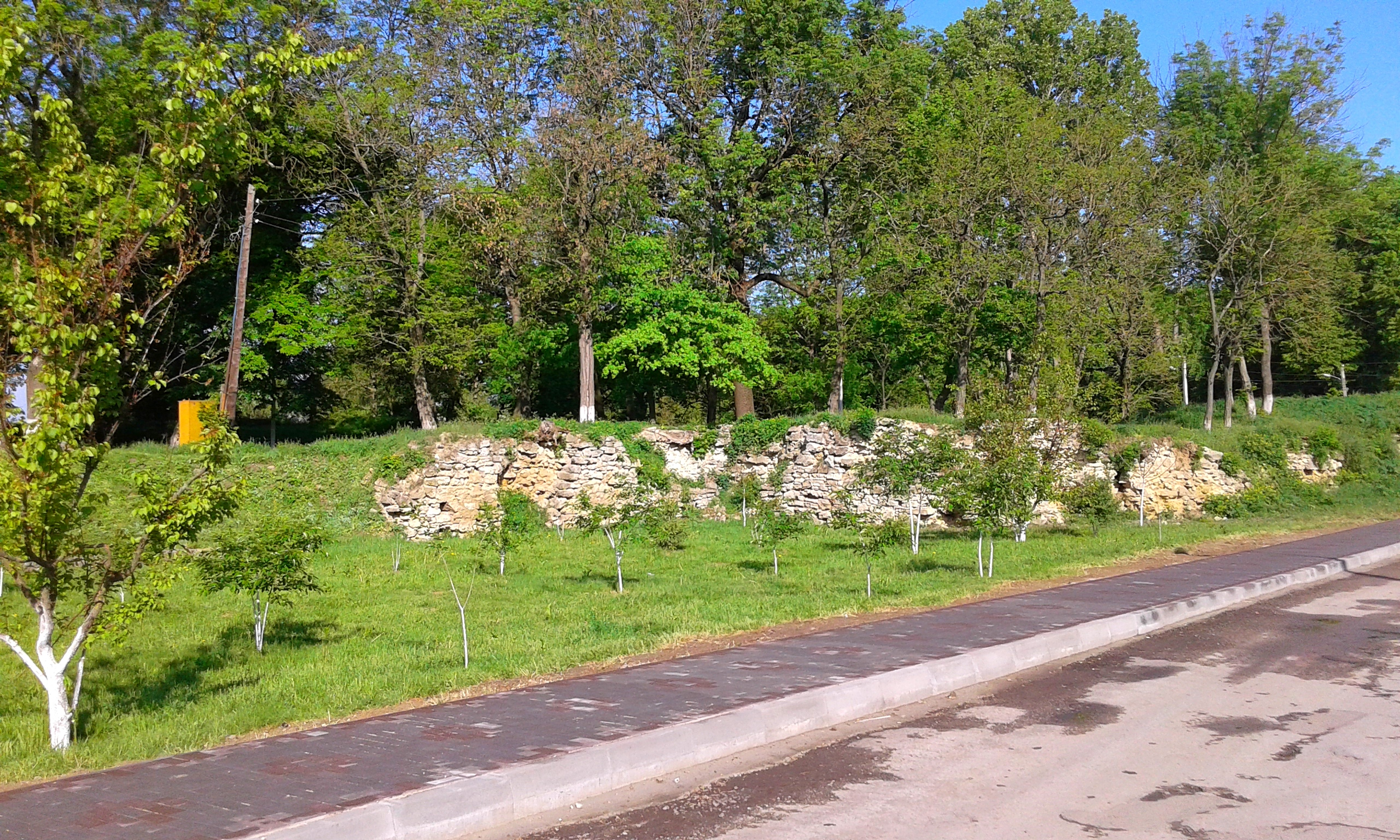
Remnants of the Bar Fortress, designed by Guillaume Levasseur de Beauplan

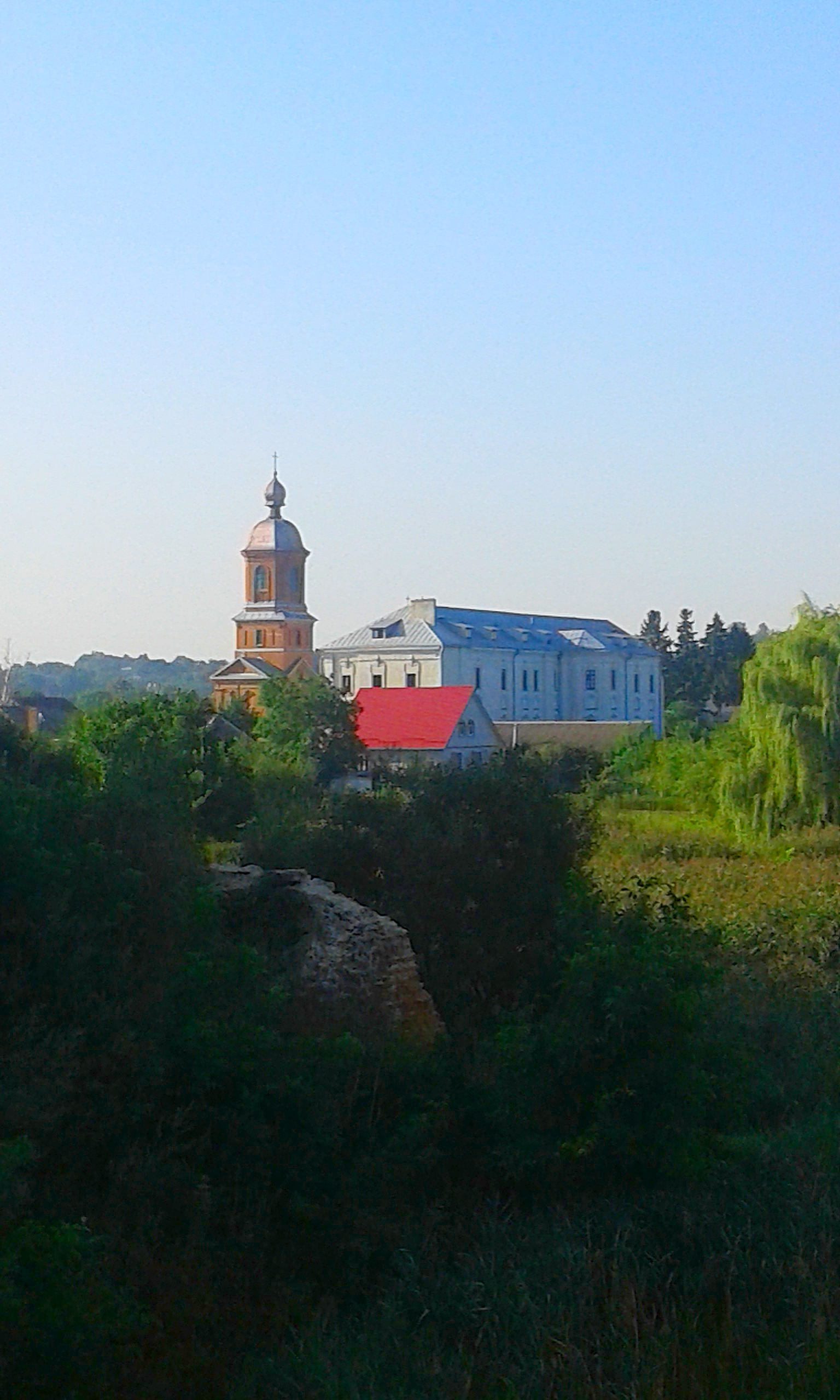
View of St. Pokrovsky Monastery's bell tower, as seen from the fortress

The town has a historic site centered around the Bar Fortress, originally built in 1537 and later re-designed by Guillaume Le Vasseur de Beauplan. The fortress currently stands in ruins. The fortress was built on the Riv River, and the historic site is now surrounded by historic religious buildings, including cathedrals. The site also includes trails surrounded by trees.

Reconstruction of the fortress was proposed at the 3rd International Scientific Conference, Bar's Land, Podill'ya: European Heritage and Innovative Development Perspectives, in Bar in 2014.

== Geography ==
Bar is located on river Riv, a tributary of Boh in Eastern Podolia.

=== Climate ===
Per the Köppen climate classification, Bar has a humid continental climate. Bar's district was historically used to grow apples.

Winters in Bar are relatively cold, with snow. The early spring is generally warm, while the summer is sunny and humid. Autumn in Bar is generally characterized by clouds and rain, with precipitation being caused by Atlantic hurricanes.

The town has instituted several programs to combat climate change, including the introduction of a waste management program, the optimization of public transportation, the minimization of air pollution by industrial plants, the thermal isolation of buildings, encouragement of bicycle transportation, and support of renewable energy initiatives.

Bar, Vinnytsia Region, Ukraine

Climate chart (precipitation, max. and min. temperature)
J	F	M	A	M	J	J	A	S	O	N	D
21 2 −7	25 5 −6	47 10 2	65 18 8	106 23 13	133 27 18	395 29 22	364 30 22	169 26 17	52 20 10	53 12 3	22 4 −3
- █ Average max. and min. temperatures in °C
- █ Precipitation totals in mm
Imperial conversion
J	F	M	A	M	J	J	A	S	O	N	D
0.8 36 20	1 41 21	1.9 50 36	2.6 64 46	4.2 73 55	5.2 81 64	16 84 72	14 86 72	6.7 79 63	2 68 50	2.1 54 37	0.9 39 27
- █ Average max. and min. temperatures in °F
- █ Precipitation totals in inches

=== Cityscape ===
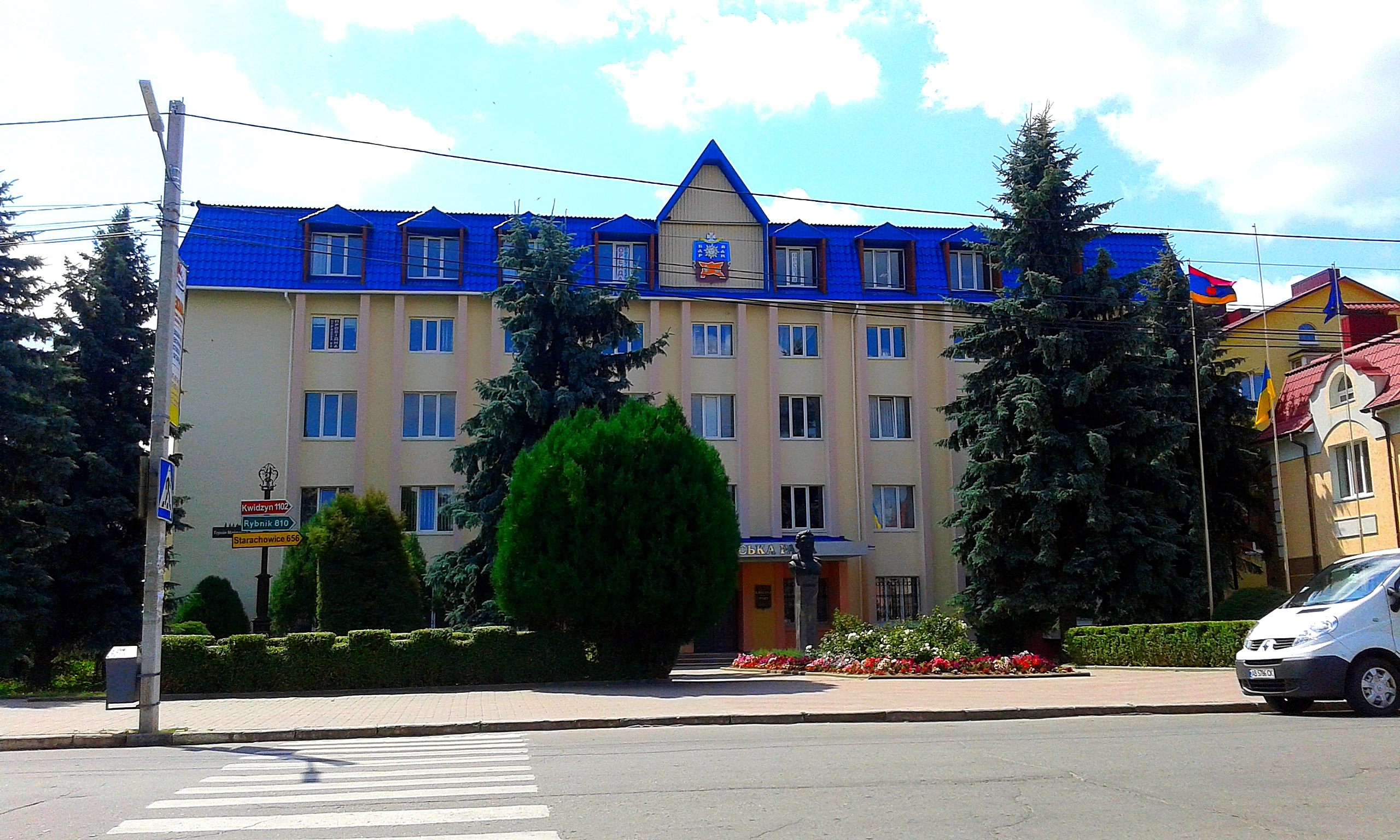
Bar City Council building

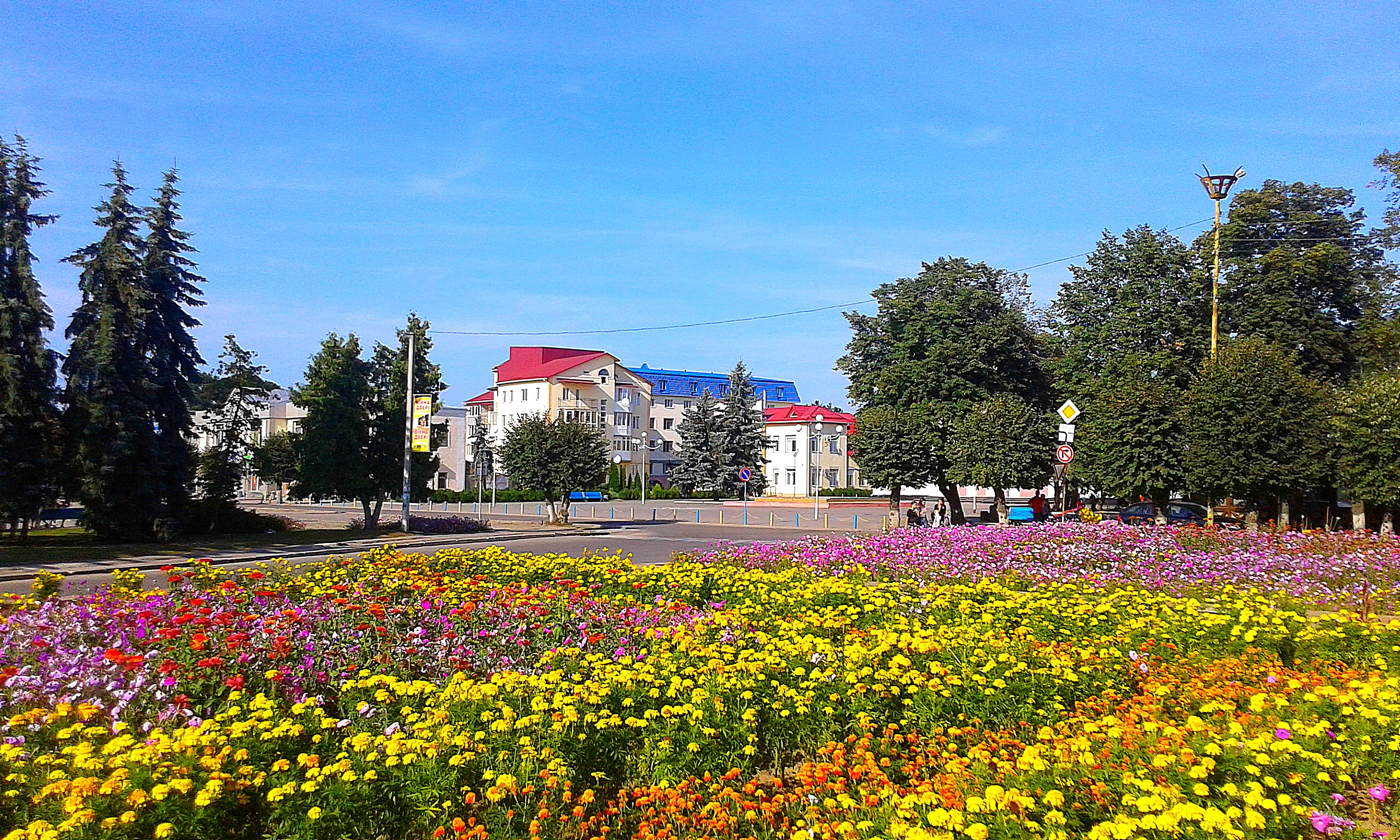
Bar central district

The city spans around 1,387 hectares (3,430 acres). The Bar district area is around 1,102 square kilometres (425 square miles). The maximum altitude above sea level is 368.8 metres (1,210 feet).

The central part of the city has a number of the historical cathedrals and the modern architecture buildings. There is a central square with a fountain, which is surrounded by the history museum, cinema, culture palace, trade center, modern hotel, city library, employment center building and some other governmental buildings in the downtown.

There is a sport stadium for football, basketball, volleyball in the center of the city. There is a swimming pool building not far away from the stadium. The local football team plays the football games at the stadium regularly. The pop music performances by various artists from Ukraine take place at the stadium from time to time.

The main educational institutions, including the Humanitarian-Pedagogical College and the Automobiles and Roads College are situated in close proximity to the downtown. Also, there are many secondary schools in the central district in the city.

The modern big residential apartments buildings, made of the red and white bricks, can be found around the city.

The Bar city library, which is located in a modern architecture building, has a digital library with Internet access.

Bar is known as a little piece of Italy in Ukraine

== Population ==
=== Historical population ===
The Bar city's total population was around 3,341 in 1850, increasing to 16,442 by 2013 approximately.

The historical population is accurately characterized in the following chart:

Historic population data in Bar
Year	Total population	Ukrainian-speaking	Russian-speaking	Orthodox	Catholic	Other	Jewish	Islamic	No religion given	Ukrainian	Non-Ukrainian
1850	3,341			1,041	2,000					3,000	341
1870	6,000			2,709	3,506					3,901	2,450
1891	13,761	13,200	561	12,000	1,561	100	100			13,500	261
1900	9,735	1,170	7,761	4,495	4,987	191	105			5,837	3,898
1910	11,524	1,456	8,669	5,324	5,547	426	217			6,743	4,781
1930	12,412	1,871	9,305	4,953	6,601	458	222			9,269	3,142
1950	14,547	2,060	11,131	5,855	7,483	616	264			11,886	2,661
1970	17,361	1,965	11,155	9,055	6,539	2,259	312	959	616	11,510	5,851
1990	17,104	961	11,241	7,957	3,449	3,922	244	475	2,974	9,881	7,223
2013	16,442	16,200	242	10,000	6,000	100	100	101	140	16,342	100

=== Languages ===
The percentage of people, who know how to speak, read, write the Ukrainian language in Bar is (95.5%).

Originally, the entire population spoke the old Slavic languages mainly, however the various historical events and the increasing international trade led to the situation, when the local population was able to get the other foreign languages skills.

English is also studied at the advanced level at English Language Faculty at Humanitarian – Pedagogical College in Bar.

The numerous computers with the audio-headsets were installed and connected to the Internet at the central city library due to both the personal efforts of Hankamp and the Bibliomist program.

== Government and politics ==
=== Administrative issues ===
The Bar municipality is administratively subdivided into a number of municipal districts.

=== Governance issues ===
The mayor is elected by direct public election, while the heads of other directorates are assigned by the collegiate. The Mayor of Bar has the executive powers; the City Council has the administrative powers to check the mayor's decisions, and the City Assembly can accept or reject the mayor's urban development strategy, city budget and city modernization proposals each year. The mayor can discuss the Bar city governance issues at regional radio station from time to time.

The City Council constitutes the executive government of the City of Bar, operating as a collegiate authority. The City Council is composed of a few respected councilors, each heading the corresponding departments and bureaus. Departmental tasks, coordination measures and implementation of laws, decreed by the City Assembly, are carried by the City Council.

The regular election of the City Assembly by any inhabitant valid to vote is held every four years. Any resident of Bar, allowed to vote, can be elected as a member of the City Assembly.

The mayor, city council, city assembly hold their regular meetings in the City Hall in Bar.

=== Twin towns – Sister cities ===
Bar has a number of sister city agreements, including Bari, Kwidzyn, Rybnik.

== Education ==
=== Colleges and schools ===
There are a few educational institutions in the Bar city, for example:

1. The Hrushevsky Humanitarian Pedagogical College where the students can study English language, finances, accounting, law, teaching, painting, music and other subjects;
2. The Bar College of Transport and Construction, founded by Tunik, where the students can study the modern engines and automobiles designs;
3. The Bar Professional Building Construction College, where the students study the architecture and buildings construction technologies;
4. The specialized music school,
5. A number of secondary schools;
6. A wide-screen cinema;
7. A city history museum;
8. A contemporary art gallery.

=== Public libraries ===
There is a modern central city library in downtown, which provides the library services to the local people and the foreign visitors in Bar's district.

Dr. Margaret Hankamp, JD, New York Law School, New York University, USA worked on the Bibliomist program to modernize the modern central city library and the one library for the young people in Bar. The Bibliomist is a part of Global Libraries initiative of Bill and Melinda Gates Foundation (BMGF).

The Bar city library was extensively renovated due to the financial support by KfW bank in Germany in June, 2015.

Also, there are the two small libraries for the young readers, one is located in downtown and another one near the medical hospital in Bar. In addition, there are the libraries at the Hrushevsky Humanitarian Pedagogical College and at the Automobiles and Roads College in Bar. There is an interconnected network of small remote libraries with Internet access at the villages in Bar's district.

== Religious sites ==
Religion in Bar (2014),
Christianity	97%
No Religion	1.5%
Judaism	1%
Islam	0.1%
Others/unspecified	0.4%

=== Christian ===
Bar has a lot of religious traditions. It is a center of Ukrainian culture and an attractive tourist destination with a large number of old Ukrainian cathedrals and the new churches such as:

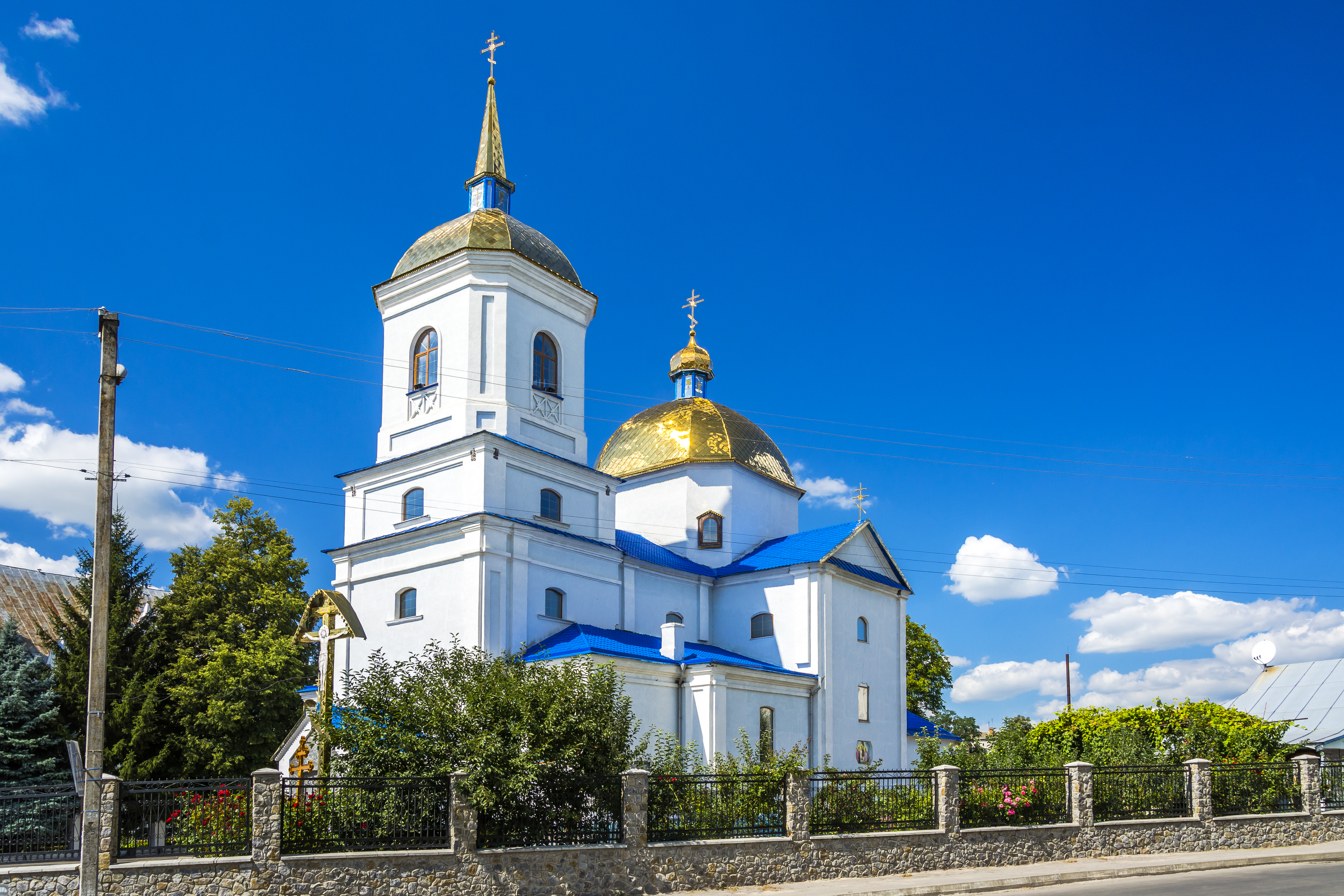
St. Assumption Orthodox Cathedral

The St. Assumption Orthodox Church, built by Tymofiy Matkovsky in 1755–1757 at the same place, where the Holy Trinity Orthodox Church was founded in 1700.

The Assumption Orthodox Cathedral is considered as one of the most remarkable architectural achievements and one of the oldest buildings in Bar, Ukraine, which has changed, reflecting the historical developments in Ukraine over the centuries. The old altar at the Assumption Orthodox Cathedral is made of special wood with the metallic decorations and the religious paintings.

Holy Trinity Orthodox Church was founded in the early 17th century. The first written memories about the Assumption Orthodox Cathedral (the St. Uspensky Orthodox Church), which was created at the Trinity Orthodox Church place, are related to 1719. The interesting fact is that the new architectural design of the St. Uspensky Orthodox Cathedral was developed, and then, the actual cathedral was constructed, using the stone, in 1755 – 1757. As it is described in the historical documents in 1771 and 1783, the Assumption Orthodox Cathedral had a high altar with the Savior icon and the two other altars.

Vasyl Matkovsky was a priest at the Assumption Orthodox Church in Bar on that time. In 1795–1809, Ioan Sinitsky became a priest at the Assumption Orthodox Church in Bar. At the same time, Fedir Batulinsky, priest (1800–1802) and Stefan Batulinsky, priest (1804–1820) conducted their religious missions at the Assumption Orthodox Church in Bar. Pavlo Batulinsky (1838–1844) served as a priest at the Assumption Orthodox Church in Bar, and then he became a key owner and a cathedral bishop in Kamyanets soon after that. Vasyl Kuzminsky, as a priest in 1844–1849 and Simeon Karchevsky, as a priest in 1849–1861 worked to continue the religious missions at the Assumption Orthodox Church in Bar. In addition, Simeon Karchevsky was a head of the Bar Orthodox Religion School at the same time. Hryhoriy Yankovsky, as a priest in 1861–1881, Ivan Korchynsky, as a priest (1881–1892), Pavlo Savluchynsky, as a priest (1892), Afanasiy Dvernytsky, as a priest (1892–) were recognized for their outstanding religious mission services at the Assumption Orthodox Church.

The church was closed for renovations in 1838–1851. A full restoration of the cathedral was also done in 1975. The "gold plated" domes were installed and the façade renovation works were completed in 2013.

At present, there are two old icons in the cathedral: The St. Michael Miracle Man icon, created in Bari, Italy in the 16th century and presented by Bona Sforza; and God's Mother icon with the silver frame, created in the 17th century, which saved the cathedral from fire in 1737 and 1760.

Priests at Assumption Orthodox Cathedral in City of Bar in State of Ukraine 1795–2016.

Presently, all Orthodox church members strictly follow the Orthodox traditions in Bar.

The first international conference: "Spiritual Treasure of Podillya" to celebrate the 260 years anniversary from the moment of St. Assumption Orthodox Church foundation as well as the 130 years anniversary from the moment of "God’s Mother" icon recognition as a miracle creating icon was held in Bar on October 12, 2017.

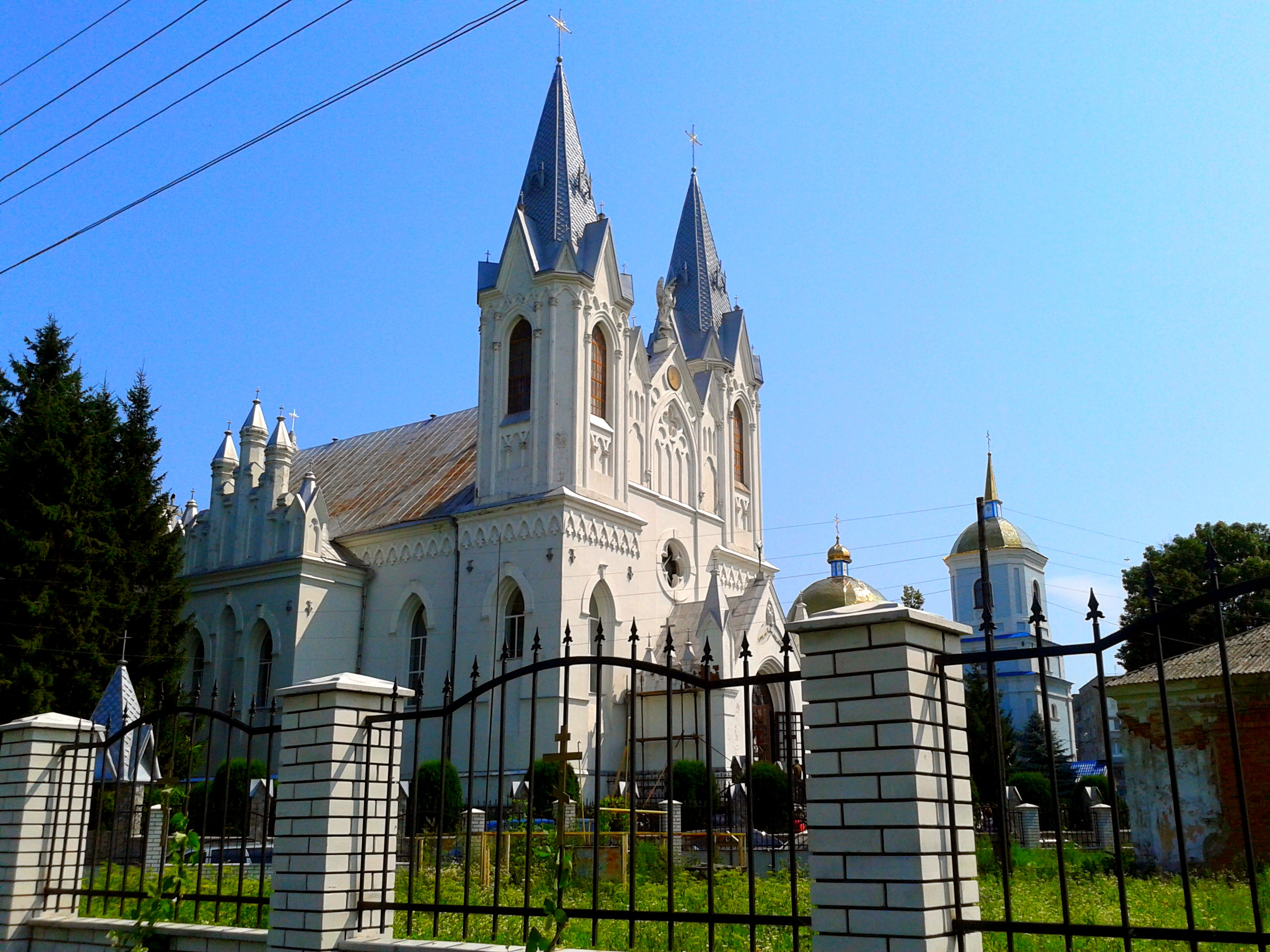
St. Anne Roman Catholic Cathedral and Assumption Orthodox Cathedral

The Bar Orthodox Women Monastery, made of red bricks, was in the process of construction under the management by Viktor Terletsky, priest and under the patronage by Simeon, Archbishop of Vinnytsia and Bar (former Archbishop of Vinnytsia and Mohyliv-Podilsky) at Harmaky near Bar since December 10, 2002. The Orthodox Women Monastery is for females only and opened in 2018.

St. Michael's Roman Catholic Cathedral, built of wood in 1550; then rebuilt in stone and renamed St. Anna's Cathedral in 1811, was renovated between 1900 – July 26, 1906 (in red bricks) The old altar is made of stone and special wood with an old religious icon placed on top of the altar.

There is a working organ for performances during religious services.

The cathedral's parishioners, as well its many visitors, include Ukrainians with Polish and Italian family roots. Polish and Italian tourists visit the Roman Catholic St. Anna Cathedral occasionally. Young Polish volunteers have frequently traveled to St. Anna's Cathedral during the summer months to help with reconstruction and renovation works.

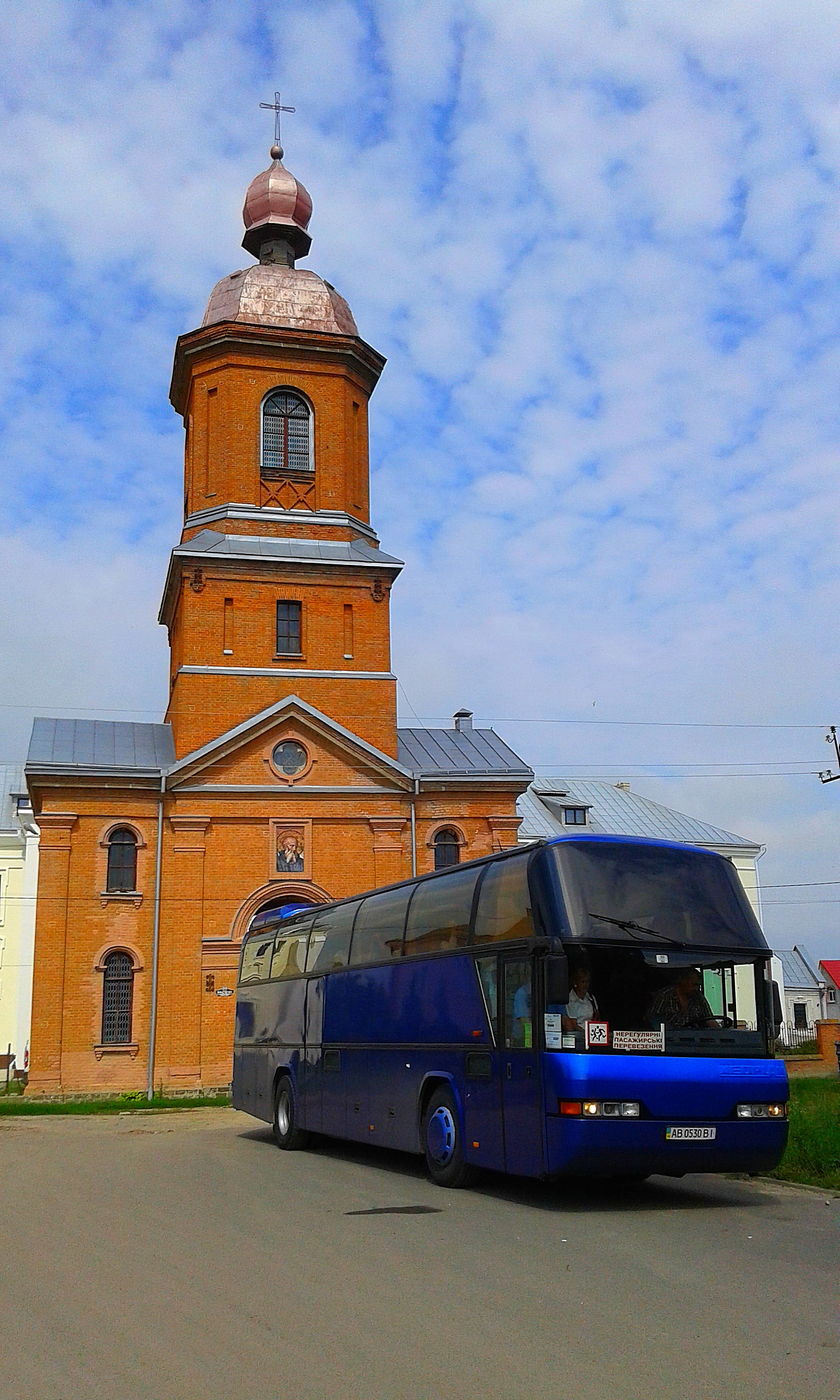
Old Bell Tower at Former St. Intercession Monastery

Former St. Pokrovsky Monastery, which is now known as the Benedictine Sisters-Missioners Monastery. The first monastery was founded by Knight Vereshagin in the woods near Semenivky, not far from Bar. The monastery was initially founded and built by Carmelites in 1551, and rebuilt in 1616, only to be rebuilt again, this time in stone, by Dominicans in 1701–1787. The history of the old monastery is divided into four periods: 1) the Carmelite period, 2) the Dominican period, 3) the Orthodox period (from 1838), 4) the Catholic Basilian period (since 1991). During the newest historical period, Cyril Podolsky initiated the foundation of the St. Pokrovsky Orthodox Monastery for males in 1837. The monastery was re-organized for females and chaired by Sister Melitina on July 20, 1881. The red brick cathedral with bells was built in 1908. The monastery was closed from 1959 to 1991. The Benedictine Sisters-Missioners of Bar re-opened the monastery in 1996.

The Old Bar Fortress, initially built in 1537, and later re-designed by Guillaume Le Vasseur de Beauplan in the 1630s. The Old Bar Fortress is surrounded by the old cathedrals and other religious buildings. There is an old green trees park with the numerous pathways inside the fortress.

The Greek-Catholic church, opened in a newly reconstructed cathedral in 1996. The new altar at the Greek Catholic Cathedral is made of wood with the metallic decorations.

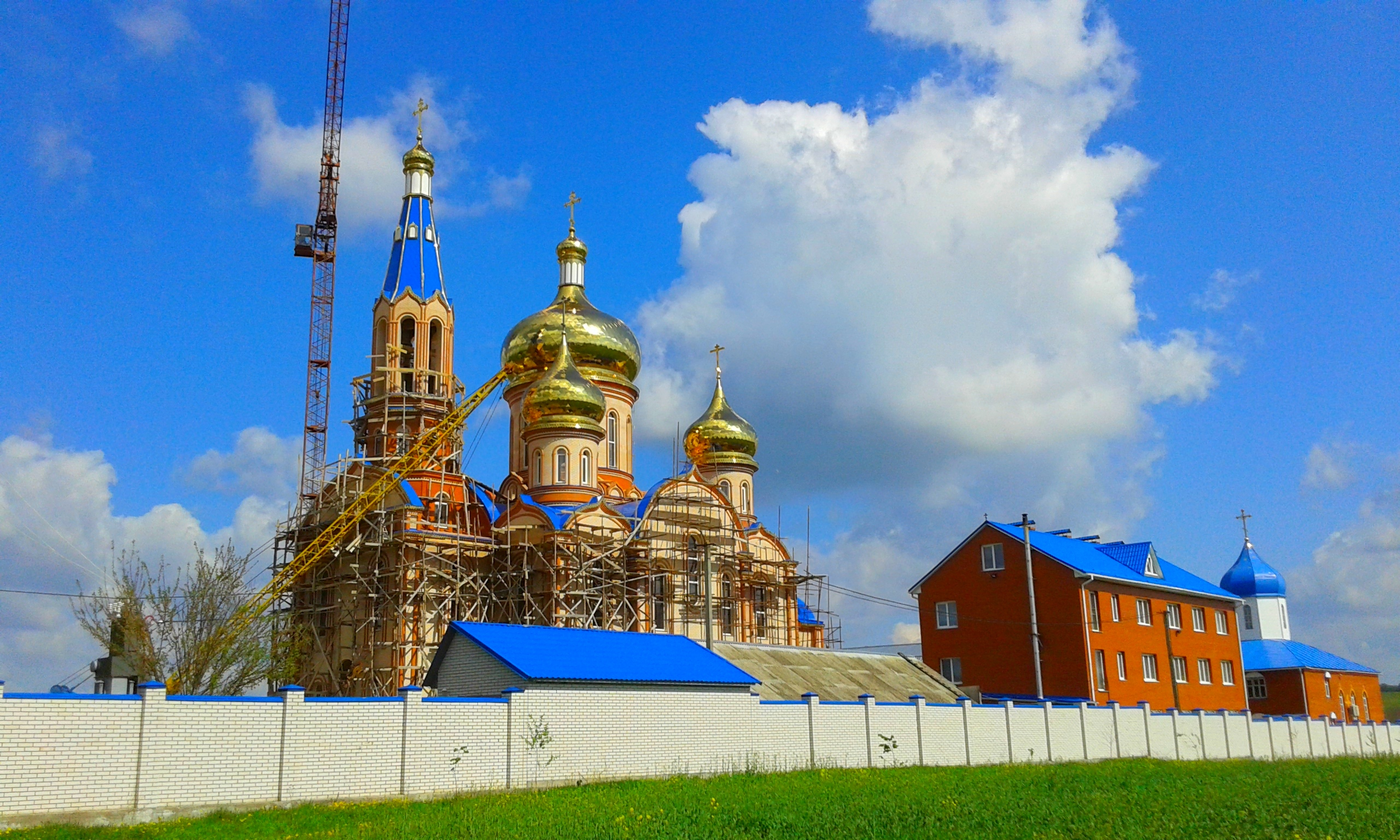
Holy Trinity Brailiv Orthodox Cathedral at Brailiv Monastery

The St. Michael Orthodox Church in the beginning of Buniakovska Street is being re-built. The idea is to re-create the old St. Michael church, which was built at this place a few hundreds years ago. Mr. Pogrebnyak, businessman is a main sponsor of construction works.

The old historical castles in Bar require more investments.

The Baptist Church was established in Bar in the 1990s. The red-bricks cathedral is in a process of construction at the end of Buniakovska Street in Bar since 2000.

The Evangelist Church is situated in a small building in Bar since the beginning of the 1990s.

=== Jewish ===
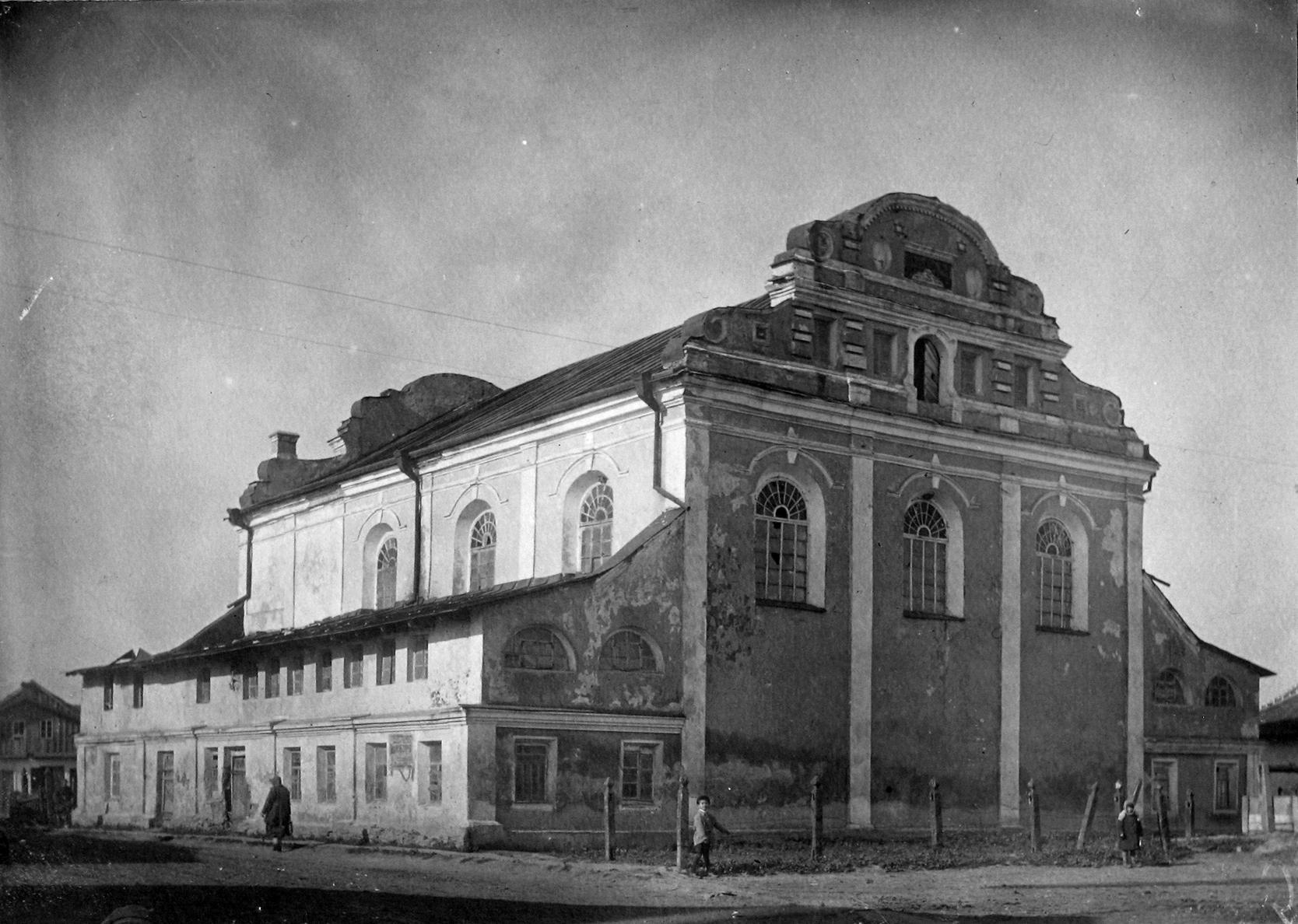
Synagogue in 1717

The Synagogue There was an oldest Synagogue in Bar, which was built in 1717. Since old time until present time, the Bar's Jewish people community is well known for its contributions to the social, cultural, financial, economical and political fields in the Ukrainian society and abroad. The information on the Bar's Jewish people community is collected at various resources.

According to the Encyclopaedia Vocabulary by Andreevsky I E (editor) published in St. Petersburg, Russia in 1891, the total population was 13,761 people, and the Jewish population was 51% of total population in 1891 in Bar. In 1900 in Bar, the total population included: 7865 Jewish people, 2803 Orthodox people, 765 Catholic people. The Jewish community was some of the tens of thousands people in Bar before the World War II (5720 people in 1926). There were many old synagogues in Bar before the World War II.

Five thousand people were killed by the Nazis during the period of occupation in Bar from 1941 to 1942. A special commemoration ceremony is usually organized in connection with the Holocaust Memorial Day in Bar on January 27 every year. Recently, Mr. Cor Roos, accountant and writer from The Desert Rose Foundation in The Netherlands presented his historical books about the Holocaust in Ukraine in 1941 - 1944 during his visit to the Bar city library.

The old synagogues were fully destroyed during World War II.

Presently, there is a growing collaboration between the Bar Jewish community and the Vinnytsia Jewish community, aiming to recognize the American Jewish people from Ukraine, tell stories about the many other Jewish people around the World and build a new synagogue in Bar.

== Culture ==
=== Ukrainian culture ===
Ukrainian culture is created on the base of the old Slavic culture.

Ukrainian traditional songs, dances, paintings, poetry and literature are present in Bar. Notable tourist destinations include the St. Uspensky Orthodox Cathedral, St. Anna Rome Catholic Cathedral, St. Pokrovsky Orthodox Cathedral, old fortress, central park with the old green trees, Ukrainian music/dances folk festivals, history museum, central city library, etc. in Bar.

The City of Bar is known as a city, where the "Love" lives in Ukraine. "The Bar City Day" is celebrated in September every year. "The Bar District Day" is celebrated in August every year. "The Apple Bar Festival" was conducted in Bar since 2018.

The ІІІ International Scientific Conference "Bar's Land Podill'ya: European Heritage and Innovative Development Perspectives," was held in Bar in September 2014.

=== Polish culture ===
Bar is known as a historical center of Polish culture in Ukraine. There is the Polish House, where Polish cultural events are conducted. The Polish House was officially opened on May 22, 2016.

=== Bar City Art Amateur Theater (BCAAT) ===
Bar City Art Amateur Theater (BCAAT) is a multicultural organisation, which makes the theatrical performances in Bar since 2016. In 2026, the BCAAT celebrates its tenth years anniversary of operation excellence as explained Mr. Roman Grygor'ev, Director in the "One Day" program at Vita TV.

=== Religious festivals ===
The religious festivals are conducted in Bar frequently.

== Economy ==
The economy includes the ten main sectors such as the agriculture, building construction industry, machine design industry, information technologies (IT) industry, food processing industry, wood processing industry, public utilities industry, domestic/international trade, transportation services industry, financial services industry, tourism industry, education industry.

Industrial companies in Bar include the Bar Industrial Machinery Plant.

The food processing industry is represented by the Pfanner apple juice international firm, which exports the concentrated apple juice to Austria mainly. There is the Barchanka big bottled mineral water company. There is the Solodka Planeta cakes producing company. There are the milk processing factory, the meat processing factory, and the fish processing factory in Bar.

The IT industry includes a number of small IT services companies (the software design) and Internet providing companies (the optical/wireline/wireless access to the Internet).

The financial industry is represented by a number of Ukrainian banks, which provide the corporate finance services and the personal finance services in the city.

There are several big trade centers such as the Econom food trade chain, the Gusi-Lebedi electronics/furniture trade chain, big market, hundreds of medium & small shops and drugstores. The tourism industry includes several hotels and motels.

A relatively short distance from Bar, there is a natural gas compressor station, which pumps natural gas over the transcontinental Urengoy–Pomary–Uzhhorod pipeline and the Union pipeline to the Polish, German and other European customers.

=== Government organizations ===
There is the Bar City Council, which is located at newly renovated building in the central district.

There is the Bar District Administration, which works at modern building in downtown.

There is the Bar Tax Authorities Administration, which functions at modern building in a central part of city.

There is the Pension Fund, which is situated in a newly redesigned building in downtown.

There is the State Archive, which keeps the information about the historical developments in Bar.

There is an Air Traffic Control Center with the beyond-visual-range-radar nearby, which provides air traffic control services in the English language for aircraft in the Vinnytsia region of Ukraine. There is also a city airport, which helicopters and light airplanes can use.

== Healthcare ==
=== History ===
The Jewish community hospital for 10 patient places, headed by Dr. Mareinis, licensed medical doctor, was in operation in Bar, Ukraine before 1920. Also, there were the three small medical hospitals for 15–20 patient places in Yaltushkov, Man'kovka and Kopaigorod villages in Bar's district before 1920.

The medical hospital with 25 patient places was functional in Bar, Ukraine before 1940, however licensed medical doctors Dr. Shamis and Dr. Burstein, including their Jewish families, were killed by national socialists in Bar, Ukraine during its occupation in World War II.

On August 1, 1945, the medical hospital of 70 patient places and with 72 medical workers was re-opened in Bar, Ukraine. The therapeutic, infectious, maternity, gynecologic, surgical, children's and x-ray diagnostic departments operated at the medical hospital in Bar, Ukraine on that time.

=== Present time ===
Presently, the medical clinic and hospital provide a wide range of medical services to the patients in Bar.

The ambulance department at the medical hospital in Bar, Ukraine was opened on February 1, 1955. The tuberculosis treatment department at the medical hospital in Bar, Ukraine was established on November 30, 1970. The blood transfusion department at the medical hospital in Bar, Ukraine was in operation since October 1, 1973. The medical clinics was opened in Bar, Ukraine on April 7, 1986. The psychoneurological department at the medical hospital in Bar, Ukraine was founded on April 4, 1989. The children's, therapeutic, neurologic, resuscitation departments at the medical hospital in Bar, Ukraine are situated in a new building, which was built in 1992.

Around 10,000 patients undergo the medical treatments at the medical hospital, and around 210,000 patients visit the medical clinic in Bar, Ukraine every year.

The medical school was established by Nikolai Ivanovich Pirogov.

Complex medical treatments are done in collaboration with the doctors from the medical clinics, universities and institutions in Vinnytsia, Kyiv and other places.

The Vinnytsia National Medical University named after the Nikolai Ivanovich Pirogov in Vinnytsia, Ukraine.

== Recreation ==
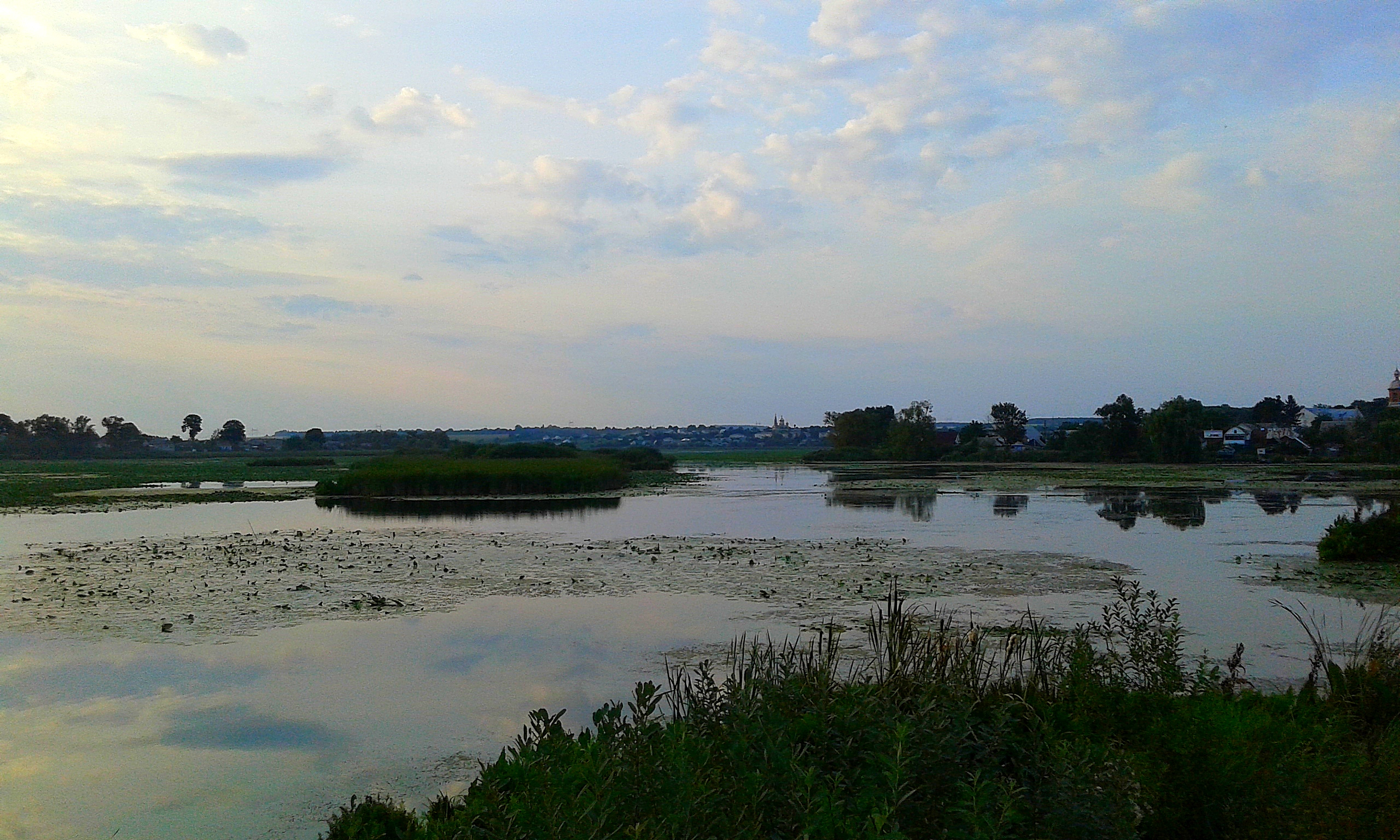
Panoramic view on Riv river with white lilies in Bar at sunset time

=== Apple Bar Festival ===
The Apple Bar Festival has been conducted by city authorities in Bar since 2018.

=== Parks ===
There is park at the old Bar fortress on the Riv River, near the center of the town.

=== Music ===
There are the Ukrainian traditional dancing and music clubs, functioning at the Culture Palace and at the Humanitarian Pedagogical College in downtown Bar, including the "Barvy" traditional music group.

=== Sport ===
Bar has facilities for many recreational activities, including tennis courts, a football stadium, a basketball arena, and a swimming pool. The "Kolos" stadium is in process of reconstruction and modernization presently. Fishing is quite popular at the Riv River and nearby lakes. Bicycling is also popular in Bar.

=== "Bar's Adventures" old people council ===
"The Bar's Adventures" old people council conducts the meetings regularly.

=== "Camino Podolico" Pilgrims ===
"Camino Podolico" pilgrimage route is quite popular among the pilgrims, who like to walk from Vinnytsia to Kamyanets' Podil's'ky with one stop in Bar, Ukraine. This pilgrimage activity is inspired by St. Jacob's pilgrimage route traditions in Santiago de Compostela in Galicia, Spain.

== Transport ==
=== Air ===
There is a small airport for the light business jets and helicopters, which is equipped with all kinds of navigation devices and systems in Bar. At the same location, there is a big beyond-visual range radar, which provides the air traffic control and navigation services in Ukrainian, Russian and English languages for various airplanes and helicopters.

=== Railway ===
There is a railway station nearby. The distance from the center of Bar to the Bar railway station is 7 km (4.3 mi).

=== Intercity bus ===
There is an inter-city bus station in the center of Bar.

=== Automobiles ===
The electric cars are becoming very popular in Bar. There are several modern electric automobiles power charging stations in the city, which are situated near the "Barselona" hotel, the Bar College of Transport and Construction, etc.

== Media ==
=== Newspapers ===
The main local newspaper is Barchany (name for the city residents), which discusses local news mostly.

The other newspaper is Podolsky Krai, which provides information on local news and developments.

=== TV and Radio Stations ===
There are several TV and Radio stations in Bar. "Bar FM 105.7" at 105.7 MHz is a most popular radio station. In Bar, it is also possible to tune into the radio programs by "TAKT Radio 103.7 FM", transmitting its signal at 103.7 MHz from Vinnytsia. "Army FM Vinnytsia 99.3" can be received at 99.3 MHz. The Digital Audio Broadcasting radio will be introduced soon in Bar.

There is an optical cable TV station with the modern digital electronic equipment and multiple satellite antennas to produce the local / international news programs for many thousands of householders.

=== Internet Media ===
"The Bar City" official news website informs the residents and tourists about the official news in the City of Bar.

"The Bar News" regional information agency with a network of its reporters focuses on the local news publishing mainly.

"The Bar Ceramics National Museum" internet media platform reports the local news about the Bar's ceramics development projects in the surrounding region.

There is the Bar City News channel at YouTube.

== Cuisine ==
Many cities provide the encyclopedic information on the cuisine, created in the course of history. The Ukrainian cuisine has formed and evolved in the historical process of the food selection and preparation through many centuries.

Bar's traditional cuisine includes pork, beef, chicken, fish, potato, grains, rice, mushrooms and various vegetables. Bar's cuisine, includes borsch or Ukrainian red soup with meat, beets, cabbage, mushrooms, potato; the Ukrainian ukha soup with the fish; the Ukrainian "shi" soup with sauerkraut; Ukrainian varenyky with meat, potato and cheese; the Ukrainian holubtsi with pork and beef, rice, carrot; the Ukrainian kotleta-po-Kyivs'ky with the pork and beef meet, the Ukrainian pork and beef sausages; Ukrainian smoked pork and beef sausages; Ukrainian shashlyk with pork and beef meat prepared on an open fire; grilled chicken with red pepper sauce; grilled duck with apples and black pepper; Ukrainian pierogi with meat, apples, and cherries; Ukrainian pizza with meat, vegetables and cheese.

Potato with mushrooms, or macaroni and cheese, or pasta with cheese, or "kartoplyanyky" / "deruny" / "draniki" with grated potato and onions, or rice with green peas are normally provided as the garnish.

Bar's Jews have their own cuisine, based on the fish, chicken and vegetables products mainly. Stuffed pike from Riv river, cooked in the oven and liverwurst is also eaten.

There are many restaurants and cafés, which serve the Ukrainian traditional food, tea, coffee in the city.

The map of Ukraine was created by using the "kartoplyanyky" / "deruny" / "draniki", made of potato, in Bar in 2018.

== Demographics ==
Racial groups in 2005
1. White (94.0%)
2. Asian (1.00%)
3. Black (1.00%)
4. Mixed (2.00%)
5. Arab (1.00%)
6. Other (1.00%)

According to the Statistics Department, there are the following race groups in the city (see the diagram). Bar population has the White, Asian, Black, Mixed, Arab and other racial groups.

== Notable people ==
- Danylo Nechay, a Ukrainian Cossack military commander and political activist, was born in Bar in 1612.
- Ivan Hryhorovych-Barskyi, architect, was born in his parents family from Bar in Litkovychi in 1713.
- Viktor Bunyakovsky, noted as a mathematician of the 19th century, was born in the city in 1804.
- Joseph Barondess, a writer, a labor leader and a political figure in New York City's Lower East Side Jewish community in the United States in the late 19th and early 20th century, was born in Bar in 1867. Joseph Barondess organized the Hebrew Actors' Union, which played an important role at Broadway in New York in 1900, and at Hollywood in Los Angeles, California at later years. The Hollywood was created by Louis B. Mayer from MGM and some others.
- Mykhailo Hrushevsky, first President of the State of Ukraine, who wrote a number of books and articles about Bar in 1892–1895. There is the Mykhailo Hrushevsky monument in Bar.
- Batsheva Katznelson, an Israeli politician, who served as a member of the Knesset for the General Zionists between 1951 and 1955, was born in Bar in 1897.
- Jacobo Timerman was born in Bar in 1923, and became internationally renowned as an editor and journalist in Argentina.
- Mykhailo Kotsiubynsky wrote a few of his well-known writings while living in Bar. His house is a place of interest for the Ukrainian and foreign tourists and it is under reconstruction.
- Mykola Leontovych, a Ukrainian composer, choral conductor, and music teacher of international renown, spent a part of his childhood together with his family in village of Shershni in Bar's suburbs in Bar's district in 1879 - 1887.
- Igor Vovkovinskiy, he was the tallest man in the United States and he was born in Bar before immigrating to the USA.
- Leon Malyi, Roman Catholic prelate, the Titular Bishop of Tabunia and Auxiliary bishop of the Archdiocese of Lviv.

== Twin towns — sister cities ==
Bar is twinned with:

City/Town		County / District / Region / State		Country	
Kwidzyn	,	Pomeranian	,	Poland	(Poland) ,
Rybnik	,	Silesian	,	Poland	(Poland) ,
Bari	,	Apulia	,	Italy	(Italy) ,

== Gallery ==
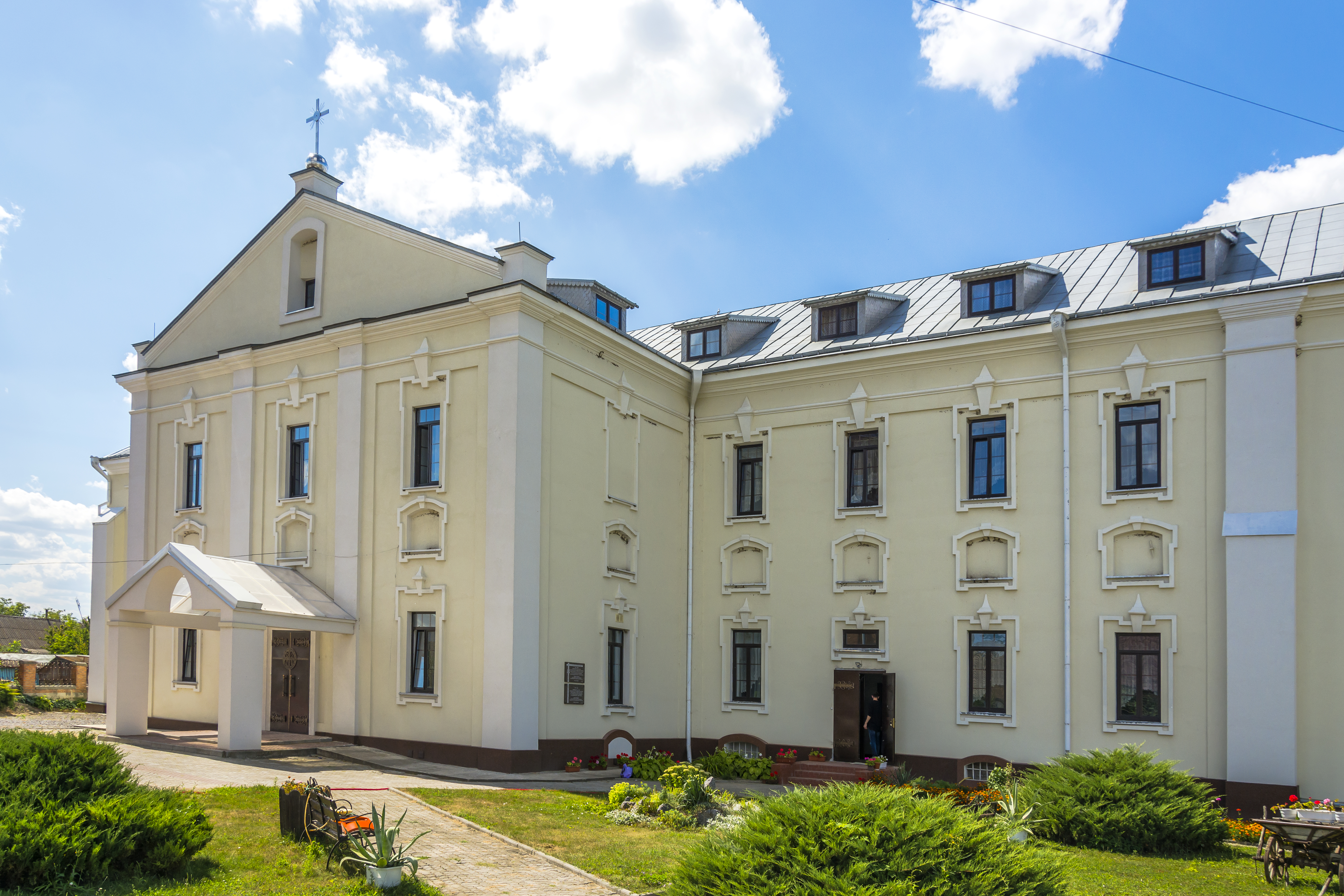
Church of the Intercession with cells

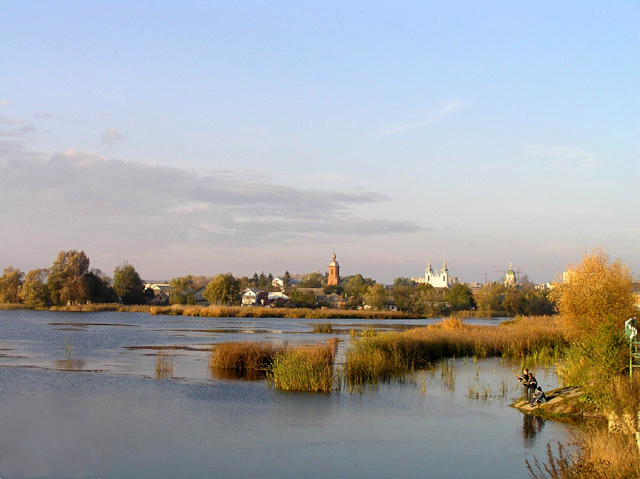
Podolia, Bar

== See also ==
- List of cities in Ukraine
- List of castles in Ukraine
- List of castles in Europe
