= Shmuel Tamir =

Israeli politician

- שמואל תמיר
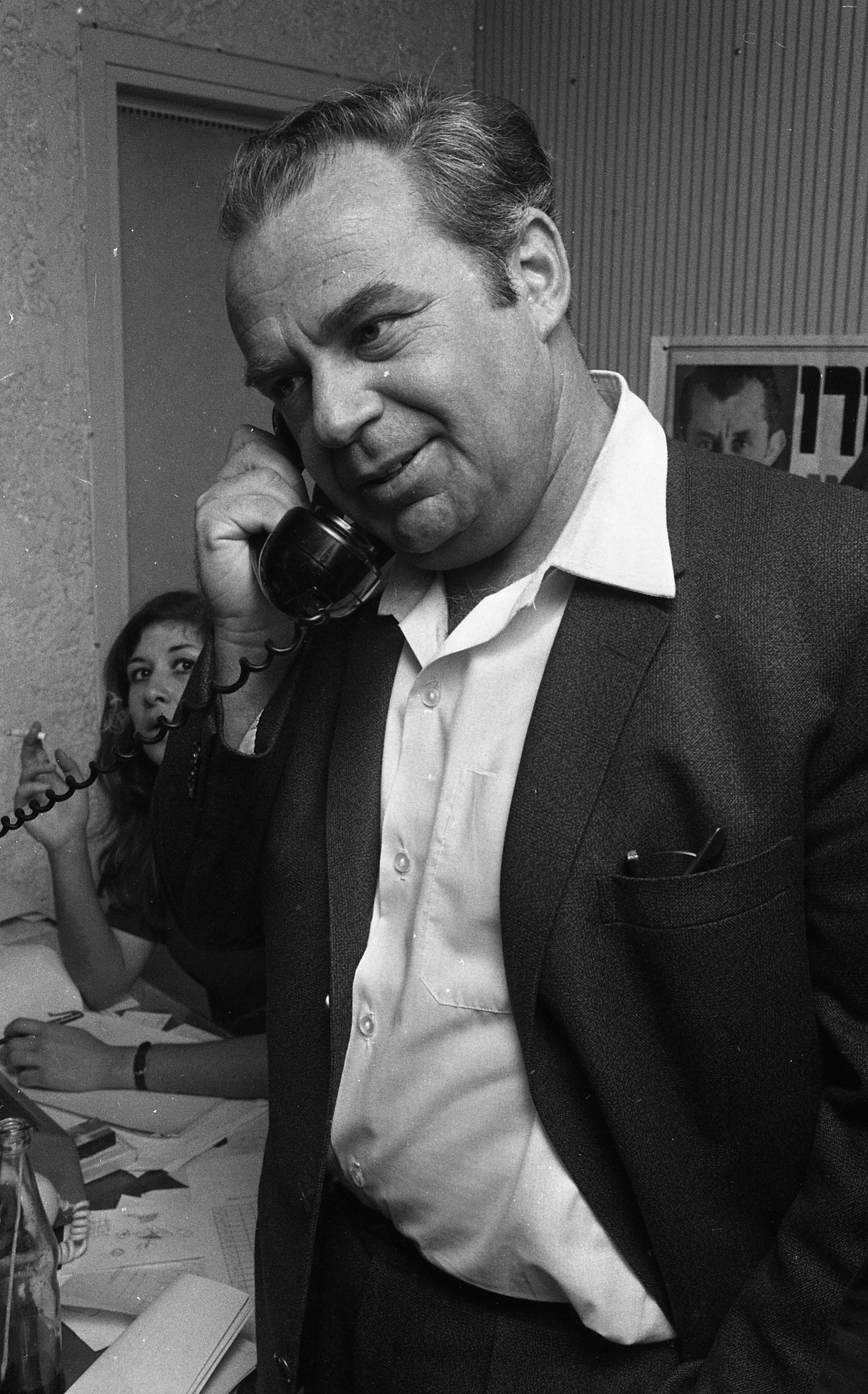

Ministerial roles
- 1977–1980: Minister of Justice

Faction represented in the Knesset
- 1965–1967: Gahal
- 1967–1974: Free Centre
- 1974–1976: Likud
- 1976–1977: Free Centre
- 1977–1978: Democratic Movement for Change
- 1978–1981: Democratic Movement
- 1981: Independent

Personal details
- Born: 10 March 1923 Jerusalem, Mandatory Palestine
- Died: 29 June 1987 (aged 64)
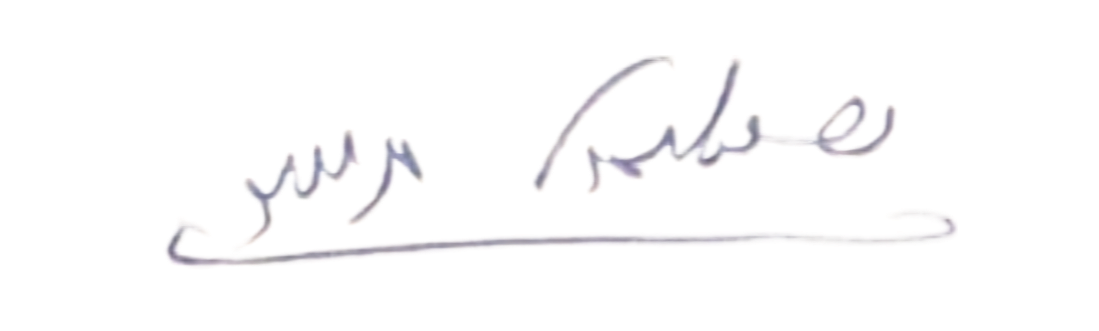
- Signature

Shmuel Moshe Tamir (Hebrew: שמואל משה תמיר; born Shmuel Katznelson; 10 March 1923 – 29 June 1987) was a prominent Israeli independence fighter, lawyer, and Knesset member. After a successful career fighting the British, he entered the Knesset from 1965 to 1980, rising to become Minister of Justice in the government of Menachem Begin from 1977 until 1980. Tamir was an ardent anti-Nazi, proactively leading legal cases to prosecute perpetrators of the Holocaust and war criminals. Tamir's maverick politics finally led him to become an independent politician after several attempts at forming coalition with nationalist right-wing parties.

== Biography ==
Born in Jerusalem, Shmuel was the son of Reuven Katznelson (a member of the Jewish Legion and Joseph Trumpeldor's sergeant and comrade in the Battle of Gallipoli) and Batsheva Katznelson (a member of the Knesset). Joseph Katznelson, a companion of Ze'ev Jabotinsky and one of the Irgun's two Chiefs of Illegal Immigration and Avraham Katznelson, one of the signatories of the Israeli declaration of independence, were both his uncles. Rachel Katznelson-Shazar, wife of Zalman Shazar, the third President of Israel, was his aunt.

== Irgun activism ==
Shmuel joined Etzel in 1938 and after the declaration of the Revolt in February 1944, and took part in operations against British targets, most notably the 26 February 1944 attack on income tax offices in Jerusalem. In 1944 he was a commander of the Jerusalem District and commanded the operation that blew up the Income Tax offices in the city, and was also Commander of Intelligence in Jerusalem District. During 1946 he served as Deputy Commander of the Jerusalem District and was in charge of the Irgun Intelligence unit in Jerusalem.

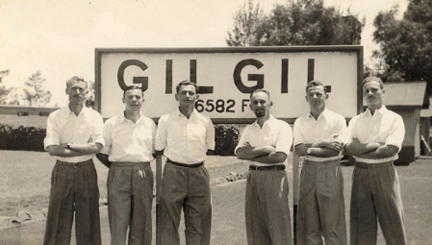
Tamir (second from right) in 1945 with other Irgun detainees in Kenya; first from right is Meir Shamgar, future President of Israel's Supreme Court, and third from right is Dov Milman, future Israeli Knesset member and ambassador

He was arrested by the British several times, and in March 1947 was exiled to Detention Camps in Kenya where he finished his Law studies. In the camp he served as the Supervisor who represented the detainees to the British Authorities.

== Legal and political career ==
Katzenelson returned home with the last exiles from Kenya on 12 July 1948, after Israeli independence was declared; upon arriving in Israel, he adopted his code name, Tamir (meaning "tall and slender") as his legal name. He had a notable career as a lawyer and conducted several famous political cases, including the Yedidya Segal and Rudolf Kastner trials.

He was one of the founders of Menachem Begin's Herut party, but left in 1952. One of the founders of the "New Regime" in 1957 after the Suez Crisis, he returned to the party in 1964, and in 1965 was elected to the Knesset on the Gahal list.

After Begin announced at the 1966 Herut conference that he intended to retire as party chairman, Tamir, who had been critical of Begin's leadership announced his candidacy for party leader. A month after the convention, Haim Amsterdam, an assistant to Tamir, published an attack on Begin in Ha'aretz; This led to the suspension of Tamir's party membership and with two other Herut MKs, he formed the Free Centre in 1967. After this revolt, Begin returned to party leadership. Tamir was re-elected in 1969, and again in 1973, by which time his party had merged into Likud. He resigned from the Knesset in January 1977 to form the Shinui Party, which failed and very soon broke up. Immediately afterwards he decided to join the new centrist party, the Democratic Movement for Change (Dash). He was returned to the Knesset in the 1977 elections on Dash's list, and was appointed Minister of Justice in the Begin government on 24 October. As Dash disintegrated, Tamir joined the Democratic Movement, before leaving to sit as an independent MK (member of the Knesset). He resigned from the cabinet on 5 August 1980 when his party was frozen out of coalition decision-making. At the ensuing 1981 election he lost his seat.

Tamir was a supporter of far-right Rabbi Meir Kahane and the Jewish Defense League.
