= Rachel Katznelson-Shazar =

Israeli independence activist

- רחל כצנלסון-שזר
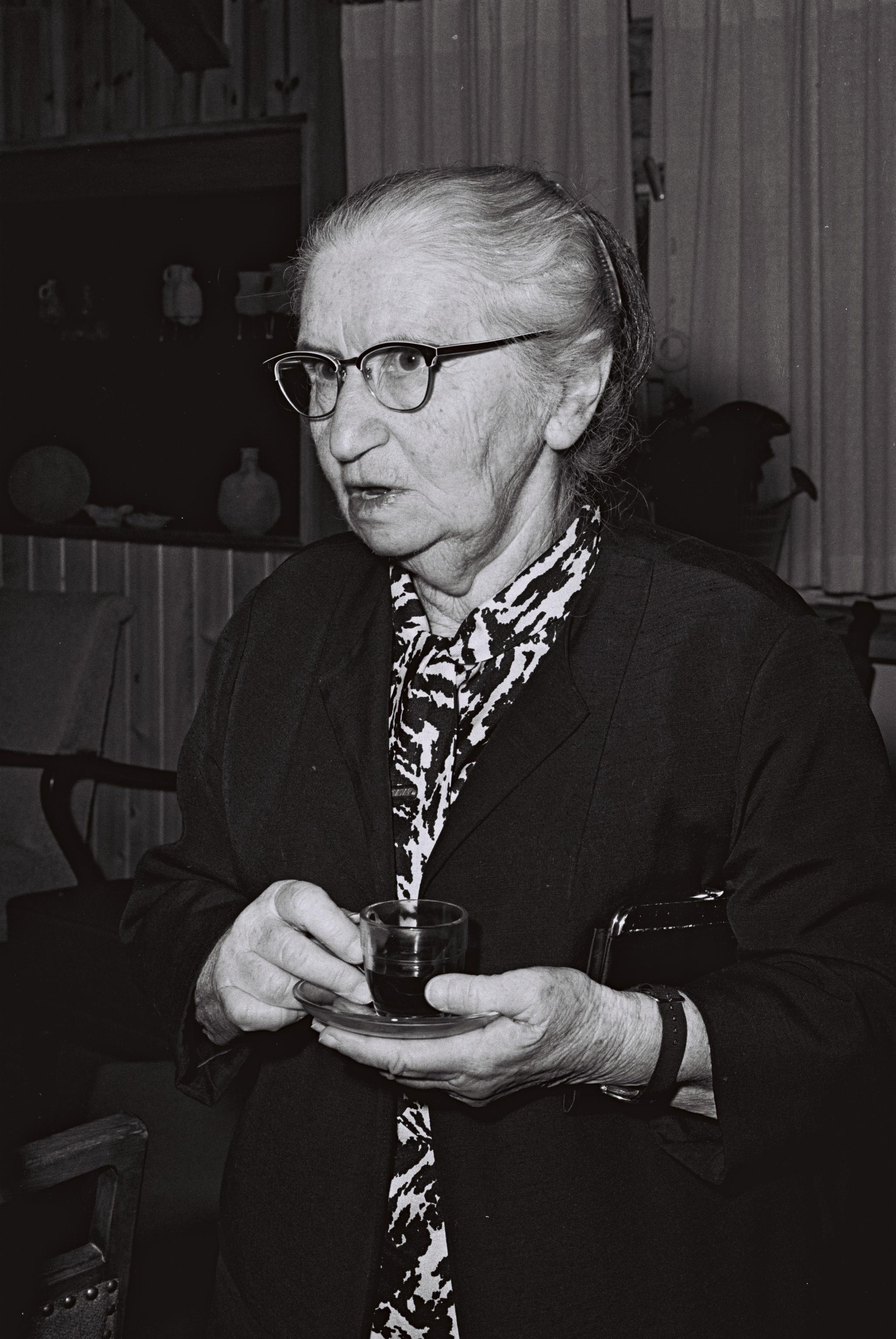
- Rachel Katznelson-Shazar
- Born: Rachel Katznelson; 24 October 1885; Babruysk, Bobruysky Uyezd, Minsk Governorate, Russian Empire (present-day Belarus)
- Died: 11 August 1975 (aged 89); Jerusalem
- Other name: Rachel Shazar
- Occupations: Politician, activist
- Known for: Zionist activist, educator
- Spouse: Zalman Shazar
- Awards: Brenner Prize (1946); Israel Prize in social sciences (1958); Yakir Yerushalayim (1968)

Rachel Katznelson-Shazar (Hebrew: רחל כצנלסון-שזר), also known as Rachel Shazar, (24 October 1885 – 11 August 1975) was an active figure in the Zionist movement. Her husband was Zalman Shazar, the third President of the State of Israel.

== Biography ==
Rachel Katznelson (later Shazar) was born in 1885 (or possibly 1888) in the city of Babruysk, then in the Russian Empire, to a traditional Jewish family. Katznelson's brothers were Avraham Katznelson, later a signatory of the Israeli declaration of independence, Joseph Katznelson, a follower of Ze'ev Jabotinsky who was active in clandestine immigration activities of the Irgun, and Reuben Katznelson, who joined the Jewish Legion and became Joseph Trumpeldor's sergeant. Reuben was the father of Shulamit Katznelson and Shmuel Tamir.

She graduated from a Russian high school with honors at the age of 18. This gave her the possibility of going to university, which was only open to a small percentage of the Jewish community. She was accepted to the St. Petersburg University to study literature and history. She also studied at the Academy for Jewish Studies in St. Petersburg, where she met her future husband, Zalman Shazar - then known as Shneur Zalman Rubashov - whom she married in 1920.

Katznelson immigrated to Ottoman Palestine in 1912 and was active in a number of Zionist organizations, having previously joined the Labor Zionist movement in 1905 in her hometown.

== Public and political activism ==
In 1916, she was elected to the first Cultural Committee of the Labor Movement, alongside Berl Katznelson and Yitzhak Tabenkin (both also originally from Babruysk), and worked with them to enhance the education of workers. She was later elected as a member of the cultural committee of the Achdut Ha'avodah party and, in 1924, of the Histadrut. Throughout her life, she was actively involved with the Histadrut and the Mapai party, and performed many public duties. She also assisted her husband in his various public functions as a member of the Knesset, a government minister, a member of the Jewish Agency executive, and ultimately as President of Israel from 1963 to 1973.

Katnzelson-Shazar died in 1975, and was buried alongside her husband on Har Herzl in Jerusalem.

== Awards and recognition ==
- In 1946, Katznelson-Shazar was awarded the Brenner Prize.
- In 1958, she was awarded the Israel Prize, in social sciences.
- In 1968, she received the Yakir Yerushalayim (Worthy Citizen of Jerusalem) award.

== See also ==
- List of Israel Prize recipients
- Women of Israel
