= Shulamith Nardi =

American Israeli translator

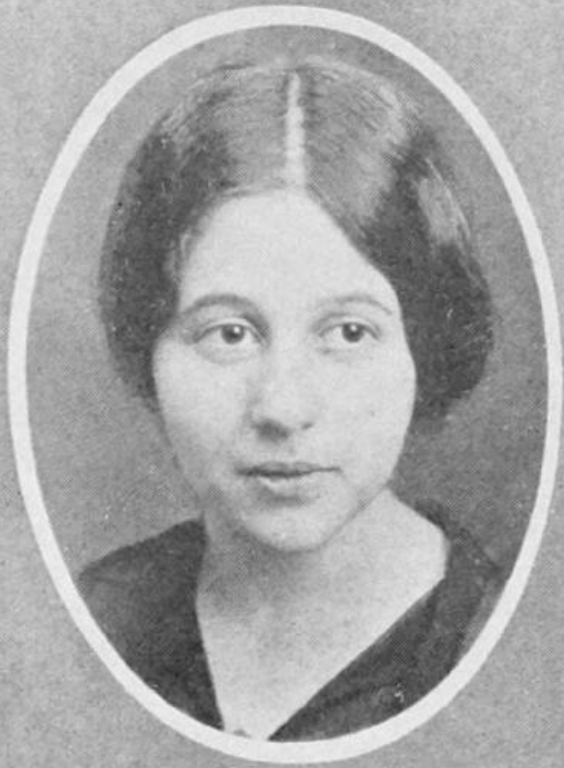
- Shulamith Schwartz, later Nardi, from the 1928 yearbook of Barnard College
- Born: Shulamith Schwartz; April 23, 1909; New York City
- Died: May 3, 2002 (aged 93)
- Occupations: Translator, writer, editor, educator

Shulamith Schwartz Nardi (Hebrew: שולמית שוורץ נרדי; April 23, 1909 – May 3, 2002) was an American-born translator, writer, editor, and educator, based in Israel after 1950.

== Early life and education ==
Shulamith Schwartz was born in New York City, the daughter of Avraham Shmuel Schwartz and Fannie Masliansky Schwartz. Her father was a physician and a poet; her maternal grandfather Zvi Hirsch Masliansky was a leader of the Zionist Organization of America. She graduated from Barnard College in 1928. She earned a master's degree at Columbia University.

== Career ==
Shulamith Schwartz was national president of Junior Hadassah from 1931 to 1933. She moved to Tel Aviv with her new husband in 1934. She taught high school English, and wrote for the Jewish Frontier periodical. She spoke about Palestine in Montreal in 1936, and was a delegate to the Twentieth Zionist Congress in Zürich in 1937. During World War II, she lived in New York again, where she was editor of the Hadassah Newsletter and a member of the American Zionist Emergency Council. She toured giving lectures to Jewish community organizations.

Nardi returned to Israel in 1951, and became an English professor at Hebrew University of Jerusalem in 1953. In 1961, she was an alternate member of Israel's delegation to the United Nations General Assembly. Beginning in the 1960s, she held an Israeli government appointment as presidential advisor on diaspora affairs. She translated from Hebrew into English several works by Zalman Shazar, and one of the Dead Sea Scrolls. She also conducted a study group on Jewish literature.

== Publications ==
- A Genesis Apocryphon: A scroll from the wilderness of Judaea (1956, by Nahman Avigadi and Yigael Yadin, translated by Shulamith Nardi)
- The Seven Scrolls (1957)
- Women Build a Land (1962, by Ada Maimon, translated by Nardi)
- Morning Stars (1967, by Zalman Shazar, translated by Nardi)
- Jewish Themes in Contemporary World Literature (1969)
- The Shrine of the Book and its Scrolls (1970)
- The world comes to Jerusalem : a collection of photographs (1983, by Sarah and Eli Ross, edited by Nardi)
- Rerooted in Jerusalem: Recollections of a Poet and Scientist (by Asenath Petrie, edited by Nardi)

== Personal life ==
Schwartz married a fellow Columbia University graduate student, Kiev-born educator Noah Nardi, in 1933. Their daughters Meira and Zvia were born in New York during the 1940s. She died in 2002, at the age of 93.
