= Zvi Hirsch Masliansky =

Belarusian-born American rabbi, lecturer and Zionist

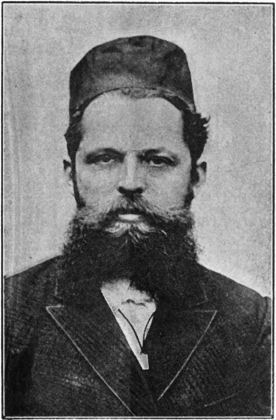

Personal life
- Born: June 6, 1856 Slutsk, Minsk Governorate, Russian Empire
- Died: January 11, 1943 (aged 86) Brooklyn, New York City, U.S.
- Spouse: Henrietta Rubenstein
- Children: Hyman, Phillip, Bertha (Mrs. Philip Turberg), Fanny (Mrs. A. S. Schwartz), Anna (Mrs. Harold Weinberg), Beatrice (Mrs. Joseph B. Perskie)
- Parent(s): Chaim Masliansky, Rebecca Papok
- Education: Volozhin Yeshiva
- Known for: Zionist activism in the U.S., editor of Die Yiddishe Velt
- Occupation: Rabbi, lecturer, Zionist

Religious life
- Religion: Judaism
- Denomination: Orthodox

Zvi Hirsch Masliansky (June 6, 1856 – January 11, 1943) was a Belarusian-born American rabbi, lecturer, and Zionist.

== Early life ==
Masliansky was born on June 6, 1856, in Slutsk, Minsk Governorate, Russian Empire, the son of Chaim Masliansky and Rebecca Papok.

Masliansky began studying in the Mir Yeshiva when he was twelve. His father died when he was fourteen, at which point he went to Parichi and studied with the local rabbi, Yekhiel-Mikhl Volfson. In 1875, he moved to Pinsk and began working as a teacher in Talmud Torahs in Pinsk and Karlin. In 1881, following a wave of pogroms and anti-Jewish decrees, he began working as a teacher and eventually became a well-known sermonizer. He initially spoke in Pinsk and exerted an influence among the Pinsk youth, including Chaim Weizmann, who later became the first President of Israel. Masliansky then travelled around the cities and towns of the Pinsky Uyezd on behalf of Hibat Tsyion. He was arrested at one point while in Noblye near Pinsk due to a denouncement, although his numerous followers persuaded the authorities to release him. In 1881, he also began writing for Avrom Ber Gotlober's Haboker as well as for Ha-Melitz and Ha-Tsfira.

The son of a rabbi, Masliansky attended the Volozhin Yeshiva and received rabbinical authorization from Rabbi Yitzchak Elchanan Spektor of Kaunas and Rabbi Samuel Mohilever of Białystok.

== Zionist activity ==
While studying, he became an adherent of the Haskalah. In 1887, he moved to Ekaterinoslav and became a preacher (Maggid). In 1891, he moved to Odessa, where he became involved in the early Zionist movement and attracted the attention of Hebrew writer and Zionist leader Moshe Leib Lilienblum. With Lilienblum's encouragement, he devoted himself entirely to preaching and became the traveling agent for Hovevei Zion, spending the next three years preaching Zionism all over Russia to the Jewish masses to great success. The Russian government became suspicious of him and he was forced to flee for England in 1894. After he left Russia, he undertook a lecture tour across Central and Western Europe. In 1895, Masliansky immigrated to America and was received as a foremost Yiddish and Hebrew orator. In 1898, he began weekly lectures in the Educational Alliance auditorium in New York City. He contributed to the Hebrew periodicals Ha-'Ibri and Ha-Pisgah.

In 1902, he became founder, president, and co-editor of Die Yiddishe Velt (The Jewish World), a Jewish daily published in Yiddish and English that he gave a Zionist orientation. The paper was financially backed by Louis Marshall and other German Jews and reflected their interests in Americanizing the immigrants and enlisting them in their anti-Tammany reform policies. The Lower East Side readers found the paper condescending and, due to the paper's poor reception, the sponsors withdrew their support in 1904. The paper folded in 1905, with Masliansky losing his personal funds in the process. He remained a frequent contributor to Yiddish and Hebrew periodicals and journals, and in 1921 his travel diary of his journey to Palestine appeared in the Jewish Morning Journal. Three volumes of his speeches were published in Yiddish in 1921. His memoirs were published in Yiddish in 1924 and in Hebrew in 1929.

Masliansky was vice-president of the Federation of American Zionists from 1900 to 1910 and president of the New York Section of the Jewish Consumptive Relief Society of Denver from 1915 to 1920. In 1915, he was elected to the American Jewish Congress. Although he was Orthodox, he had a unique willingness to cooperate with Reform and secular Jews in Jewish communal activities. From 1910 to 1922, he served on the executive committee of the Kehillah of New York City. He was a charter member of the Union of Orthodox Jewish Congregations of America in 1898 and the Jewish Ministers Association of America in 1916. He was also a director of the Israel Matz Foundation since its founding in 1925 and head of the Yeshivah of Boro Park in Brooklyn from 1929 until his death.

== Personal life ==
Masliansky attended Temple Beth El of Borough Park. In 1875, he married Henrietta Rubenstein of Pinsk. Their children were Hyman, Phillip, Bertha (Mrs. Philip Turberg), Fanny (Mrs. A. S. Schwartz), Anna (Mrs. Harold Weinberg), and Beatrice (Mrs. Joseph B. Perskie). Shulamith Nardi was one of his grandchildren.

Masliansky died at his home in Brooklyn on January 11, 1943. Over 2,500 people attended his funeral in Temple Beth-El. Rabbi Stephen S. Wise, Louis Lipsky, Nahum Goldmann, and Rabbi Israel H. Levinthal spoke at the funeral. The honorary pallbearers included Chaim Weizmann, Dr. Solomon Goldman, Rabbi Israel Goldstein, and Rabbi Abba Hillel Silver. Masliansky was buried in Mount Carmel Cemetery.
