= Shulamit Katznelson =

Israeli educator (1919–1999)

- שולמית כצנלסון
- Born: August 17, 1919; Geneva, Switzerland
- Died: August 6, 1999 (aged 79); Netanya, Israel
- Other name: Shulamith Katznelson
- Education: University of Michigan
- Known for: Educator

Shulamit Katznelson (Hebrew: שולמית כצנלסון; 1919–1999) was a pioneering Israeli educator and ulpan founder who sought to bring Jews and Arabs together through language studies.

== Biography ==
Shulamit Katznelson was born in Geneva, Switzerland, on August 17, 1919, to a prominent political family. Her mother, Batsheva Katznelson, was a member of the Knesset, and her uncle, Zalman Shazar, was Israel's third president. Her father, Dr. Reuven Katznelson, was also well known for his research in public health and social work. In 1921 she emigrated with her family to Palestine. She attended high school and teachers' college in Jerusalem, and earned her master's degree in social work at the University of Michigan at Ann Arbor.

In 1951 she founded the Ulpan Akiva, a residential language school in Netanya, Israel. It was one of the first three ulpanim in Israel. She spent nearly 50 years directing the school, where Jews and Arabs were encouraged to get to know each other, speak each other's language, and learn about each other's history and culture. Many students from different backgrounds developed lifelong friendships at the school.

She died of a heart attack at her home in Netanya, Israel, on August 6, 1999.

== Awards and recognition ==
For her efforts to improve Jewish-Arab relations, she received the nation's highest honor, the Israel Prize, in 1986. She also received the Knesset's Speaker's Prize in 1983, and was nominated for the Nobel Peace Prize in 1992 and 1993.

== See also ==
- Education in Israel
