= Dov Milman =

Israeli diplomat (1919–2007)

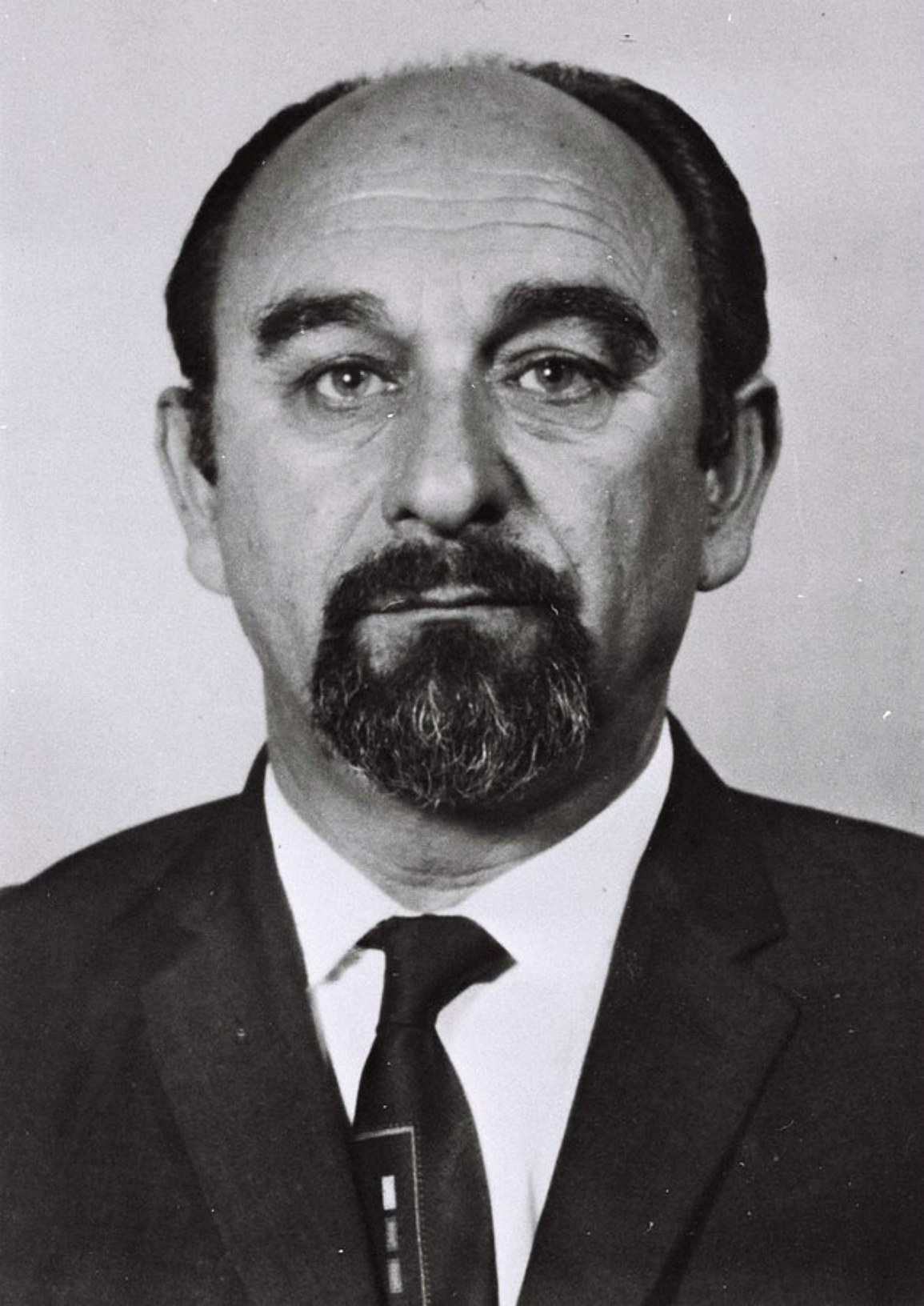
- Milman in 1969

Faction represented in the Knesset
- 1969–1974: Gahal

Other roles
- 1981–1983: Ambassador to Portugal

Personal details
- Born: 16 January 1919 Riga, Latvia
- Died: 4 May 2007 (aged 88)

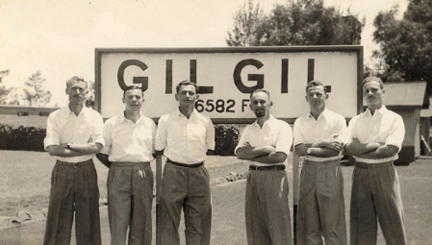
Milman (third from right) in 1945 with other Irgun detainees in Eritrea; on right is Meir Shamgar, future President of Israel's Supreme Court, and second from right is Shmuel Tamir, future Israeli Minister of Justice

Dov Milman (Hebrew: דב מילמן; 16 January 1919 – 4 May 2007) was an Israeli politician and diplomat who served as a member of the Knesset for Gahal between 1969 and 1974, and as ambassador to Portugal from 1981 until 1983.

== Biography ==
Born in Riga in Latvia, Milman attended a Hebrew Tarbut gymnasium joined the Betar youth movement in 1931, and became an instructor. He made aliyah to Mandatory Palestine in 1937.

He joined the Irgun, becoming commander of its Jerusalem district battalion in 1940. He also studied political science and philosophy at the Hebrew University of Jerusalem, and attended law schools in Jerusalem and at the University of London, being certified as a lawyer in 1951. He later served as first secretary of the Israel Bar Association between 1963 and 1965.

In 1948 he was among the founders of Herut, and became a member of its central committee. Between 1955 and 1959 he chaired the Tel Aviv branch of the party, and from 1968 until 1988 chaired its municipal department.

He was elected to the Knesset on the Gahal list (an alliance of Herut and the Liberal Party) in 1969, but lost his seat in the 1973 elections.

From 1979 until 1980 he was an Israeli delegate to the European Parliament, and served as deputy head of the country's delegation to the European Economic Community. In 1981 he was appointed ambassador to Portugal, a role he held until 1983. From 1987 until 1990 he chaired the board of directors at the Shikun VePituah housing company, and between 1996 and 2000 he chaired the Likud Veterans Association. He also chaired the Latvian and Estonian Immigrants Association.

He died in 2007 at the age of 88.
