= Bibliomist =

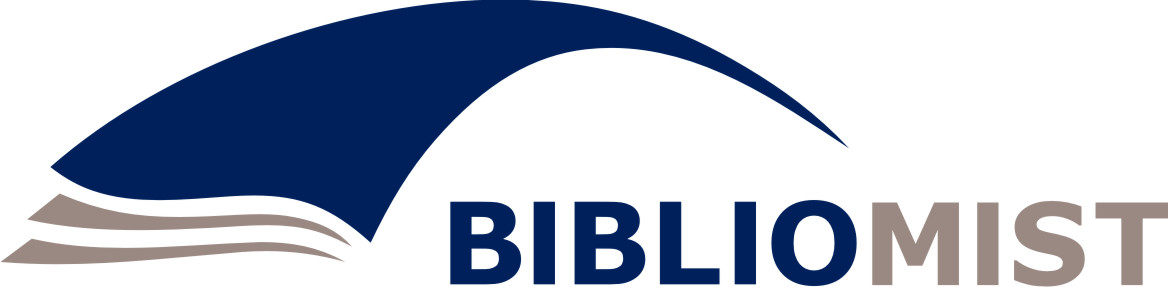
- Purpose: library modernization
- Location: Kyiv, Ukraine
- Product: librarianship development

Bibliomist (Ukrainian: Бібліоміст, Russian: Библиомист) is a program of Ukrainian libraries' modernization. Bibliomist’s goal was to expand access to information and modern technology by equipping up to 1,800 public libraries with technology by 2014; training librarians to use new technology at 25 training centers, and improving computer literacy among patrons at participating libraries across the country. The program’s goal was to help librarians advocate for libraries and raise necessary resources to serve community needs, promoting modern Ukrainian libraries among the general public.

== History ==
Bibliomist is a part of Global Libraries initiative of Bill and Melinda Gates Foundation (BMGF) implemented in Chile, Mexico, Botswana, Lithuania, Latvia, Romania, Ukraine, Poland, Bulgaria, Vietnam and Moldova. The goal of the initiative is to support and sustain free public access to computers and the Internet globally and to bridge the digital divide.

The underlying idea is that access to information helps people change their lives and that it is essential in today’s globalized society. Under this initiative, BMGF provides funding to purchase computer equipment, train librarians in modern technology use and by these means help libraries become modern community and information centers.

Bibliomist program was launched in 2009 based on the results of needs assessment of public libraries "Public Libraries as Points of Public Access to Information, Technology and the Internet" (2008) conducted by the Ukrainian Library Association (ULA) and supported by IREX. In Ukraine, more than 75% of people lack regular access to the Internet. While Ukraine has made rapid economic advances over the last two decades, libraries have been largely left behind, and, as a result, millions are without critical access to the information they need. Through Bibliomist, public libraries are becoming vital community centers where citizens can obtain important information available online and receive assistance from a qualified librarian.

== Structure ==
Bibliomist is a partnership of the following organizations: International Research and Exchanges Board (IREX), selected by the Bill and Melinda Gates Foundation to implement Bibliomist in Ukraine, the Ukrainian Library Association (ULA), Microsoft, which donates an estimated $9 million in software to Ukraine’s public libraries, as part of its global initiative to endow communities with accessible and useful technology and the Ministry of Culture of Ukraine. A Protocol of Intentions between the Ministry of Culture and IREX regarding implementation of project "Bibliomist" was signed in Kyiv on December 8, 2008. The Ministry of Culture provides overall project supervision of Bibliomist.

== Activity ==
Bibliomist awards funding to public libraries on a competitive basis through a series of contests: "Public Access Contest", "Community Participation Contest" (small grants), "Learning Libraries", "Outreach contest". Besides, librarians are encouraged to participate in various professional development programs, such as "Library Leadership Program", and take part in different online contests.
