= Zalman Shazar =

President of Israel from 1963 to 1973

- זַלְמָן שַׁזָּ״ר
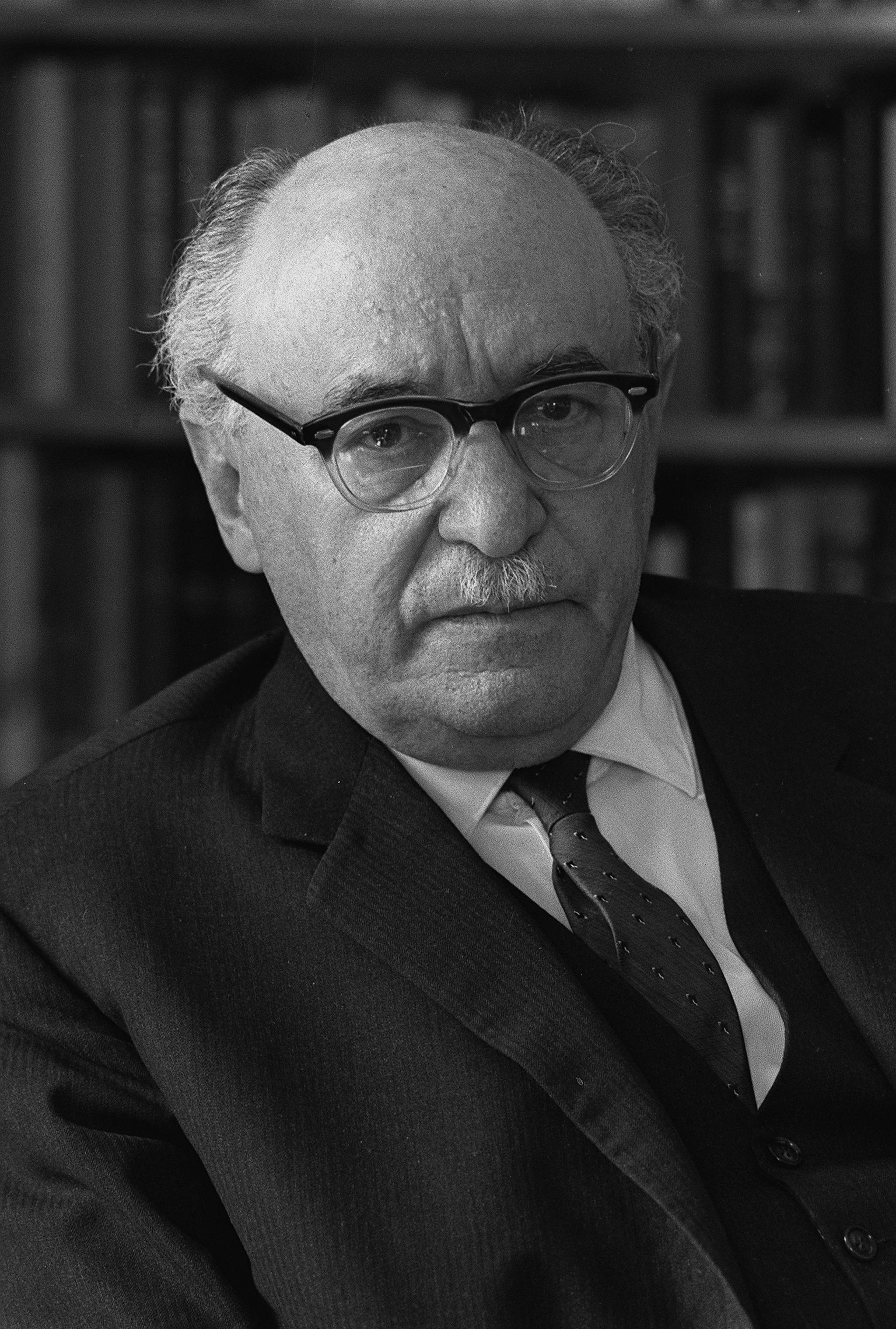
- Shazar in 1963

3rd President of Israel
- In office 21 May 1963 – 24 May 1973
- Prime Minister: David Ben-Gurion; Levi Eshkol; Yigal Allon (interim); Golda Meir
- Preceded by: Yitzhak Ben-Zvi; Kadish Luz (acting)
- Succeeded by: Ephraim Katzir

Member of the Knesset
- In office 14 February 1949 – 8 October 1956

Personal details
- Born: 24 November 1889 Mir, Novogrudsky Uyezd, Minsk Governorate, Russian Empire
- Died: 5 October 1974 (aged 84) Jerusalem
- Citizenship: Russian Empire; Mandatory Palestine; Israel
- Party: Mapai
- Spouse: Rachel Shazar
- Children: 1
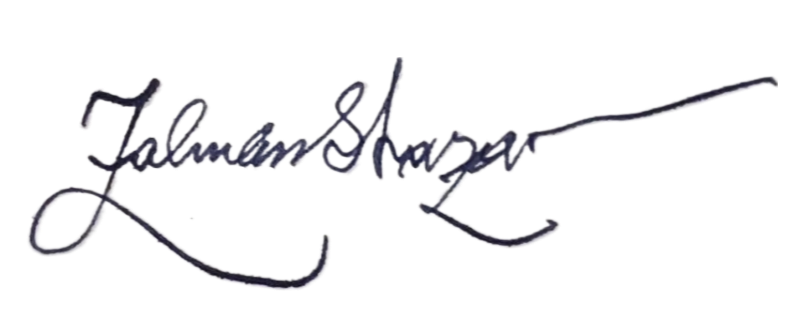
- Signature

Zalman Shazar (Hebrew: זַלְמָן שַׁזָּ״ר; 24 November 1889 – 5 October 1974; born Shneur Zalman Rubashov) was a Belarusian-born Israeli politician, author and poet. Shazar served as the president of Israel for two terms, from 1963 to 1973.

== Biography ==
Shazar was born Shneur Zalman Rubashov to a Hasidic family of the Chabad-Lubavitch denomination in Mir, near Minsk, in the Russian Empire (today in Grodno Region, Belarus). His mother's family descended from Joel Sirkis. In his early years, Shazar received a religious education.

He remained involved with Chabad for the rest of his life, assisting Rabbi Yosef Yitzchok Schneersohn, the sixth Lubavitcher Rebbe in founding the village of Kfar Chabad, and at his behest, allowed the religious community in Israel to set up their own educational system. He later corresponded with the seventh Lubavitcher Rebbe Menachem Mendel Schneerson, and visited him on multiple occasions.

During the Revolution of 1905, he took part in organizing Jewish self-defense in the Western Region. In his teenage years, he became involved in the Poale Zion Movement. He worked as a translator in a Zionist publishing house. He visited Palestine in 1911 but returned to Russia to serve in the army. In 1924, after his release, he immigrated to the British Mandate of Palestine, settling in Tel Aviv, and became a member of the secretariat of the Histadrut.

Shazar was married to Rachel Katznelson-Shazar, with whom he had one daughter.

He died on 5 October 1974, and was buried on Mount Herzl in Jerusalem.

== Journalistic and political career ==
Shazar served as the editor-in-chief of the Israeli newspaper Davar from 1944 to 1949. In 1947, he was a member of the Jewish Agency's delegation to the negotiations for the UN partition plan for Palestine and played a key role in drafting Israel's Declaration of Independence.

He was elected to the first Knesset in 1949 as a member of Mapai, and was appointed Minister of Education in David Ben-Gurion's first government. He was not a member of Ben-Gurion's second cabinet, but retained his seat in the 1951 and 1955 elections. He also became a member of the Jewish Agency Executive in 1952. He resigned from the Knesset in 1956, and from 1956 to 1960 was acting chairman of the Jewish Agency's Jerusalem Executive.

== President of the State of Israel ==
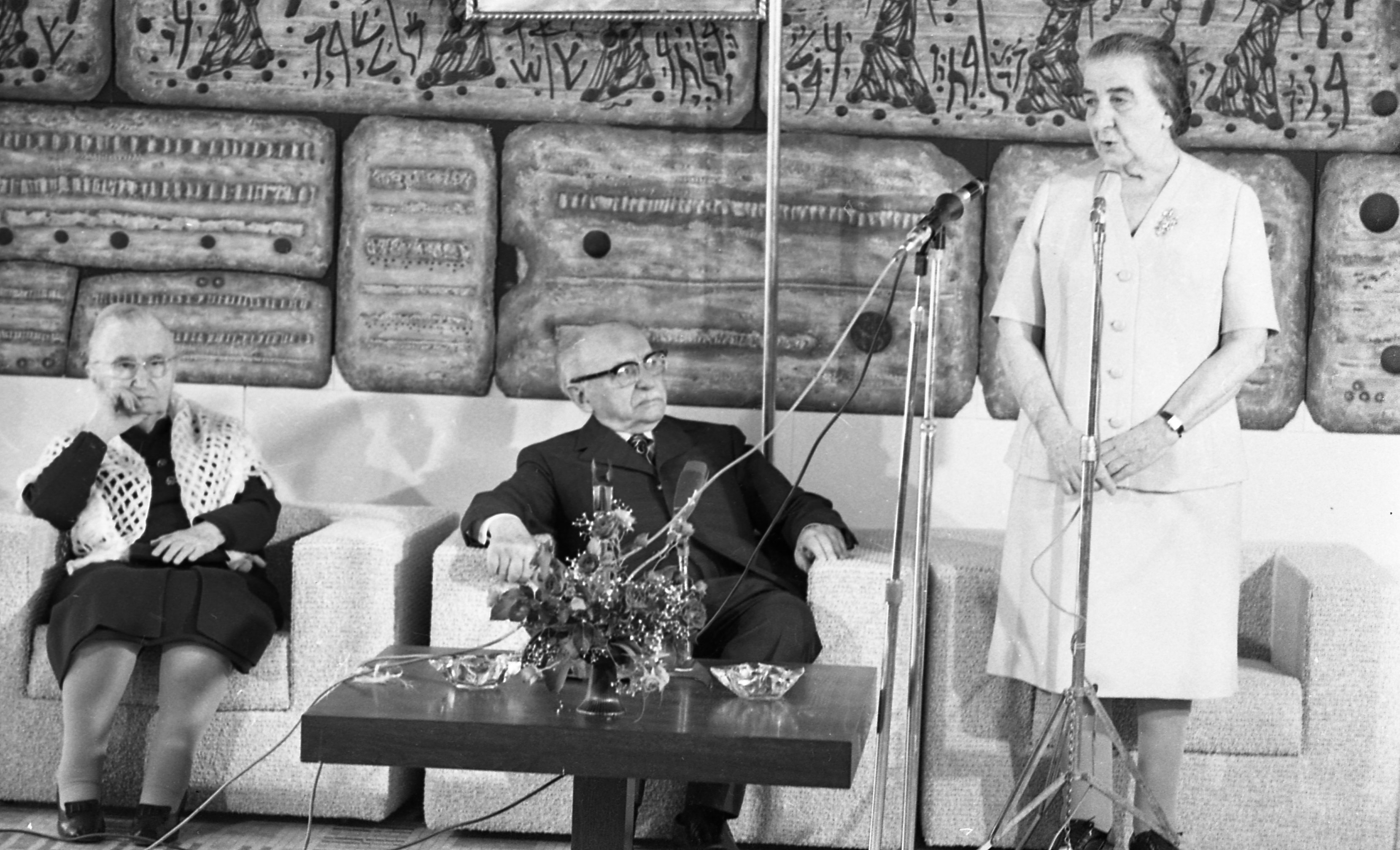
Shazar in the center, commemorating along with Golda Meir (right) Israeli Independence. In the background is a volcanic ash relief by Moshe Castel.

Shazar was elected president by the Knesset in 1963. That same year, he attended the funeral of John F. Kennedy after his assassination in Dallas. In 1964, when Pope Paul VI visited Israel, Shazar read to him the verse in Micah stating that though other nations might follow other gods, “we will walk in the Name of our Lord God forever”. He was re-elected for a second term in 1968.

In 1969, Shazar sent one of 73 Apollo 11 Goodwill Messages to NASA for the historic first lunar landing. The message still rests on the lunar surface today. It states, "From the President of Israel in Jerusalem with hope for 'abundance of peace so long as the Moon endureth' (Psalms 72,7)." In 1973 he was succeeded by Ephraim Katzir.

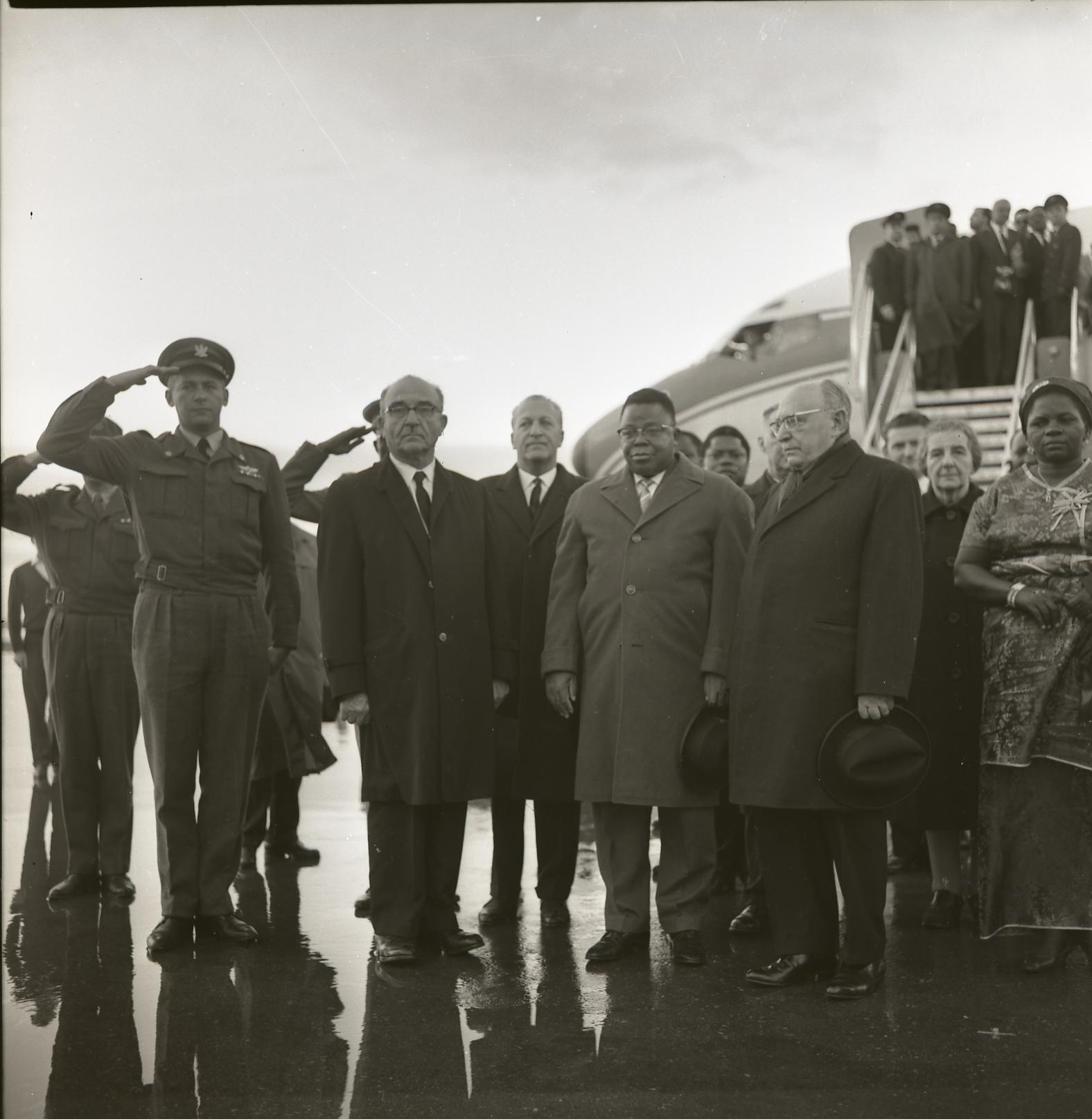
Shazar with President of the Republic of the Congo Joseph Kasa-Vubu during his visit to Israel in 1963

=== International and state visits ===
During his presidency, Shazar made numerous international trips and state visits:

- United States - Funeral of President John F. Kennedy (1963), Funeral of President Dwight Eisenhower (1969), state visit and meeting with President Richard Nixon (1971), memorial service to President Harry Truman (1973), State Funeral of Lyndon B. Johnson (1973)
- United Kingdom - Funeral of Prime Minister Winston Churchill (1965)
- Nepal - State visit and meeting with King Mahendra of Nepal (1966)
- Uruguay - State visit and meeting with President Alberto Héber Usher (1966)
- Chile - State visit and meeting with President Eduardo Frei Montalva (1966)
- Brazil - State visit and meeting with President Humberto de Alencar Castelo Branco (1966)
- Canada - Centennial celebrations and meetings with Governor General Roland Michener and Prime Minister Lester Pearson (1967)
- Denmark - Funeral of King Frederik IX of Denmark (1972)

== Legacy ==
The Zalman Shazar research center was named after Shazar, which researchers Jewish history.

== Published works ==
- Morning Stars, Jewish Publication Society of America: Philadelphia, 1967. Translated from the Hebrew, Kochvei boker (Tel Aviv: Am Oved Publishers, 1950; 7th edition, 1966) by Shulamith Schwartz Nardi. Library of Congress Card Catalog Number: 66-17828.

== Awards and recognition ==
- In 1966, Shazar was the co-recipient (jointly with Israel Efrat) of the Bialik Prize for literature.
- Shazar's portrait appears on 200 shekel bills.
- Zalman Shazar Junior High School in Kfar Saba is named after him.

== See also ==
- List of Bialik Prize recipients
