= Cerfbeer =

Cerfbeer, Cerf Beer or Cerfberr is a French-language Jewish surname derived from the names Cerf and Beer. Notable people with this surname include the following:

- Herz Cerfbeer of Medelsheim (or Cerf Beer), otherwise Naphtali Ben Dov-Beer (1730–1793), Alsatian-French Jewish philanthropist
- Samson Cerfberr of Medelsheim (c. 1780 – 1826), Alsatian-French Jewish soldier and author
- Frédéric Cerfberr (1786–1842), Alsatian-French Jewish diplomat
- Max-Théodore Cerfbeer (1792–1876), French Jewish military officer
- Maximilien Charles Alphonse Cerfberr of Medelsheim (1817–1883), French Jewish journalist, writer
- Auguste Édouard Cerfberr (1811–1858), French Jewish author
- Anatole Cerfberr (1835–1896), French Jewish journalist and author
