= Beer (surname) =

Beer is an English and German surname. Notable people with this surname include the following:

- Aaron Beer (1739–1821), German ḥazzan
- Alan Beer (born 1950), Welsh footballer
- Alexander Beer (1873–1944), German architect
- Alice Beer (born 1965), English television presenter
- Amy-Jane Beer (fl. 2023), British nature writer
- Angelika Beer (born 1957), German politician (Alliance 90/The Greens)
- Anthony Stafford Beer (1926–2002), English theorist in operational research, founder of management cybernetics
- Arthur Beer (1900–1980), German astronomer
- August Beer (1825–1863), German mathematician, chemist and physicist
- Axel Beer (born 1956), German musicologist
- Carol Beer, a fictional character from British comedy show Little Britain, portrayed by David Walliams
- Charles Beer (born 1941), Canadian politician
- Claudia Beer (born 1993), German curler
- Cheryl Beer, Welsh singer and multi-media artist
- Edwin Beer (1876–1938), American surgeon
- Edwin John Beer (1879–1986), British chemist and geologist
- Ferdinand P. Beer (1915–2003), French mechanical engineer and university professor
- Georg Joseph Beer (1763–1821), Austrian physician, founder of the research center of ophthalmology
- George Louis Beer (1872–1920), American historian
- Giacomo Meyerbeer (born Yaakov Liebmann Beer) (1791–1864), German composer, brother of Wilhelm Beer and writer Michael Beer
- Gillian Beer (born 1935), English literary critic
- Isaiah Beer Bing (1759–1805), French writer and translator
- Israel Beer (1912–1966), Israeli senior official convicted of espionage
- Jens Henrik Beer Sr., Norwegian politician
- Jens Henrik Beer (1799–1881), Norwegian businessperson, farmer and politician
- Jolyn Beer (born 1994), German sport shooter
- Joseph Beer (1908–1987), operetta composer
- Joseph Beer (clarinetist) (1744–1811)
- Klaus Beer (1942–2023), German track & field athlete
- Madison Beer (born 1999), American singer and actress
- Maggie Beer (born 1945), Australian chef
- Maike Beer (born 1996), German curler
- Max Josef Beer (1851–1908), Austrian composer
- Michael Beer (cricketer) (born 1984), Australian cricketer
- Michael Beer (poet) (1800–1833), German poet
- Moses Shabbethai Beer (d. 1835), Italian rabbi
- Nicola Beer (born 1970), German politician
- Oliver Beer (footballer) (born 1979), German footballer
- Patricia Beer (1919–1999), English writer
- Paula Beer (born 1995), German actress
- Peter Beer (judge) (1928–2018), American judge and politician
- Peter Beer (RAF officer) (born 1941), British Air Vice Marshal
- Phil Beer (born 1953), English multi-instrumentalist, composer and producer
- Randall Beer, American computer scientist
- Richard Beer-Hofmann (1866–1945), Austrian writer
- Seth Beer (born 1996), American baseball player
- Sidney Beer (1899–1971), racehorse owner and conductor
- Vivian Beer (born 1977), American designer and artist
- Wilhelm Beer (1797–1850), German banker and astronomer
- Will Beer (born 1988), English cricketer

== See also ==
- De Beer
- Beers (surname)
