= Shabtai =

Shabtai (Hebrew: שַׁבְּתַאי or שַׁבְּתַי) is a Jewish masculine given name derived from the Hebrew word Shabbat, and is traditionally given to boys born on that day. Alternative transliterations into English include Sabbatai, Sabbathai, Shabbatai, Shabbethai, and Shabsai.

It is the name of a Levite in the Tanakh, and the name in Hebrew for the planet Saturn. Notable people with the name include:

== Given name ==
- Shabtai Ambron (fl. early 18th century), astronomer
- Shabtai Bass (1641–1718), father of Jewish bibliography, and author
- Moses Shabbethai Beer
- Shabbethai Bass
- Shabbethai ben Meïr ha-Kohen (1621–62), the "Shach", a noted talmudist and halakhist
- Shabtai Daniel (1909–81), Israeli journalist and politician
- Shabbethai Donnolo
- Joseph Shabbethai Farhi
- Shabsai Frankel (1909–2000), rabbi, businessman, philanthropist, and publisher of Torah books
- Shabbatai HaKohen
- Shabbethai Horowitz (c. 1590–1660), rabbi and talmudist
- Shabtai Sheftel Horowitz (1565–1619), kabbalistic author
- Shabtai Kalmanovich (1947–2009), KGB spy
- Shabtai Konorti (1943–2002), Israeli actor
- Shabtai Levy (1876–1956), Israeli mayor of Haifa
- Shabsa Mashkautsan (1924–2022), Soviet soldier, Hero of the Soviet Union
- Shabbethai Nawawi (fl. 17th century), rabbi
- Shabbethai Panzieri
- Shabbethai Premsla
- Shabtai Rosenne (1917–2010), Israeli professor and diplomat
- Shabtai Shavit (born 1941), Director General of the Mossad
- Shabtai Shikhman (1915–87), Israeli politician
- Shabtai Teveth (born 1925), Israeli journalist and academic
- Shabtai Zvi (1626–76), Jewish Messiah claimant and founder of the Sabbatean movement
- Shabtai Zisl ben Avraham (b. 1941), better known as "Bob Dylan."

== Surname ==
- Aharon Shabtai (born 1939), poet and translator
- Benny Shabtai, Israeli American businessman, investor, and philanthropist
- Ḥayyim Shabbethai (1557–1647), Chief Rabbi of Salonika
- Yaakov Shabtai (1934–81), Israeli novelist, playwright, and translator
- Kobi Shabtai, 19th Commissioner of the Israel Police

== See also ==
- Vera Shabshai (1905–1988) Soviet dancer, teacher and choreographer
- Shabtai (society), a global Jewish society of Yale University students, alumni, and current and former faculty
