= Shabashewitz =

Shabashewitz is a Lithuanian Jewish surname derived from the Hebrew personal name Shabtai, typically given to boys born on Shabbat (Saturday). It likely originated in or around the towns of Raseiniai and Viduklė in the former Kovno Governorate.

Notable people with the surname include:

- Marx Bashew (born Mordecai Shabashewitz; 1876–1949), Lithuania-born South African entrepreneur
- Volodymyr Shabashevych (1946–), Ukrainian-Canadian composer

== Related surnames ==
- Sabsovich
