= Nicolas Muzin =

Canadian-American political strategist and attorney

- Born: 26 July 1975 (age 51)
- Education: Yeshiva University; Yale Law School; Albert Einstein College of Medicine
- Occupations: Lawyer; Lobbyist; Physician
- Known for: Stonington Global

Nicolas David Muzin is a Canadian-American Republican political strategist, lobbyist, attorney and physician. He served as the director of coalitions for the United States House Republican Conference and was a senior adviser and deputy chief of staff for Republican candidate for President of the United States Sen. Ted Cruz. Prior to that, he was Director of Coalitions for the House Republican Conference and Chief of Staff to then-Congressman Tim Scott. After the 2016 elections, he founded Stonington Strategies, which represented, among other clients, the State of Qatar, and the Democratic Party of Albania.

== Early life ==
Muzin was raised in a Jewish family in Toronto, Ontario, and is the son of Helen and Gary Muzin. His father was the president of a construction distribution and supply company.

== Education ==
Muzin attended Ner Israel Yeshiva High School in Toronto. After spending some post-high school time at the Talmudical Yeshiva of Philadelphia, he attended Yeshiva University in the Washington Heights section of Manhattan. While there, he served as editor in chief of the school newspaper, The Commentator, graduating in 1997. Muzin then completed Albert Einstein College of Medicine on a full four-year scholarship in 2001. Following a year as an internal medicine intern, he proceeded to Yale Law School, where he served as Vice President of the Federalist Society. At Yale, Muzin was a member of the Jewish leadership society Shabtai.

== Career ==
=== Early career ===
In 2000, Muzin supported the Al Gore / Joe Lieberman ticket. Muzin worked in the Montefiore Medical Center in the Bronx, New York City. While in law school, Muzin joined George W. Bush's 2004 reelection campaign as counsel for the Republican National Committee and served as a medical adviser for the 2008 presidential campaign of Sen. John McCain. From 2005 to 2008, Muzin was of council at Williams & Connolly, focusing on healthcare litigation.

=== Work with Tim Scott ===
Muzin first met Scott during his run for lieutenant governor in South Carolina in 2009. Muzin suggested he pivot from his lieutenant governor campaign to running for Congress. Muzin served as campaign manager and Scott won his election to become the first Black Republican senator from the South since Reconstruction.

Muzin was chief of staff and policy adviser for then Charleston City Councilmember Tim Scott during his successful 2010 campaign for US Congress following the retirement of Rep. Henry Brown. Muzin served as Scott's chief of staff until December 2011. Muzin was “instrumental in paving Scott’s way” and Scott revealed “without Muzin’s entreaties…[he] may not have run for the Charleston-area House seat that opened.” Nick Muzin arrayed on his dining room table what would turn out to be the winning strategy to elect the first black Republican to Congress from South Carolina in more than a century. “Initially, I was fairly reluctant. I did not have my sights set on Washington,” Scott said. “He was crucial in helping me to get to that conclusion.”

Muzin and Scott bonded over health policy, and interest in each other's beliefs. “The close alliance – and friendship — between a black Tea Party Republican from the South and an Orthodox doctor-lawyer from Canada is a rarity in politics, and upends perceptions about how blacks and Jews interact.” The end of 2012 saw promotions for both Muzin and Scott. Muzin became the director of strategy and coalitions for the House Republican Conference for the 113th Congress. In this role, he coordinated strategy and outreach for all 234 Republican majority members of Congress. Scott was appointed to the U.S. Senate by South Carolina Governor Nikki Haley. Muzin remained involved with Scott during his transition from the House to his current position in the Senate, and Muzin became the national political director for the Washington D.C. political action committee Tomorrow is Meaningful (TIM-PAC), which focuses on encouraging entrepreneurship, private market-driven health care, tax reform, strengthening ties with longtime U.S. ally Israel, and an additional aim of sourcing viable candidates to bolster the Tea Party movement's political base.

In 2013, Muzin successfully performed the Heimlich maneuver on Congressman Ted Poe, saving his life after the congressman started choking on a piece of popcorn.

=== Work with Ted Cruz ===
Recruited by Chad Sweet, national campaign chairman for Sen. Ted Cruz, Muzin served as senior advisor and deputy chief of staff for strategy for Cruz's Republican candidacy for President of the United States in the 2016 election. Cruz stated that he used Muzin as a sounding board on issues related to Judaism and to gain a deeper understanding of the religion and the broader community.

In July 2016, Muzin was considered by Yeshiva University, his alma mater, for the position of university president. Stephen Joel Trachtenberg, the former president of George Washington University headed the search and praised Muzin as an “attractive” candidate.

=== Work with Donald Trump administration ===
Muzin was first introduced to President Trump in 2013. He organized political events for the 2016 election and played a role in the transition and inauguration. During the 2017 legislative session, Muzin played a key role in the passage of the First Step Act, a major piece of criminal justice legislation. It was a particularly difficult time for criminal justice reform, and among the most important holdouts on the Republican side at the time was Texas senator Ted Cruz. The key to reaching Cruz was Muzin, who "arranged a conference call which included long-time Cruz supporters, prominent Texan rabbinic leaders, influential legal figures like Alan Dershowitz, former attorney general Michael Mukasey, and conservative thought leaders, with multiple speakers covering the issue from personal, religious, moral, policy, and legal perspectives." Just over a week later, on December 7 — which, Muzin observes, “was Shabbos Parshas Mikeitz, when we read of Yosef being released from prison” — Cruz announced his support for the legislation. With Cruz's change of heart and that of a few others, the First Step Act passed with an overwhelming majority of 87–12.

The first Trump administration hired Muzin’s firm Stonington Global, to help “Voice of America” provide programming services for its Middle East coverage.

=== Qatar ===
In 2017 and 2018, Muzin introduced Steve Witkoff, as well as Witkoff’s son and business heir Alex, to top officials in the Qatari Government, including Sheikh Mohammed bin Hamad al-Thani, brother of the emir, and the leadership of the Qatari Investment Authority (QIA).

In February 2018, it was reported by Haaretz and The Times of Israel that the Qatari government had hired Muzin to improve the Emirate's relations with the Trump administration and the Jewish American community. Muzin's work reportedly included arranging meetings between Qatari officials and leaders of Jewish and pro-Israel advocacy groups. In September 2017, Muzin registered with the Justice Department as a foreign agent for Qatar. He and Joey Allaham introduced Qataris to prominent Jewish American figures and offered them trips to Doha to meet with the Emir of Qatar and other prominent government officials. American Jewish leaders who accepted trips organized by Allaham and Muzin included Alan Dershowitz, head of the Zionist Organization of America Mort Klein, and Malcolm Hoenlein. On June 6, 2018, Muzin announced on Twitter that he had stopped working for Qatar.

=== Eliyahu Weinstein ===
In December 2020, Muzin, Alan Dershowitz, and other criminal justice reform advocates helped seek clemency for Eliyahu Weinstein, who was sentenced to 24 years in prison for fraudulent real estate transactions, the longest sentence in the history of New Jersey for such an offense. In January, President Trump commuted Weinstein's sentence to time served. The New York Times wrote that Muzin and Dershowitz's "combination of access, influence and substantive expertise...produced striking results" in winning clemency. Within months of being pardoned by Trump, Weinstein began a Ponzi scheme, to the amount of $44 million, before being caught and sentenced to jail in 2025, this time for 37 years, assuming Trump does not pardon him again. Over his criminal career he had stolen nearly a quarter billion dollars.

=== Stonington Global ===
Muzin is the Founder and Chairman of Stonington Global, a specialized law and consulting firm based in Washington, where he focuses on strategic international advisory and private equity work and practices as an attorney. The firm provides programming services to Voice of America Persian News Network, the American government-backed media outlet that produces journalistic content for the Iranian community. Stonington Global also works on pro bono issues related to criminal justice reform, religious freedom and human rights. In the 2nd quarter of 2024, Stonington Global inked a $750,000 deal with Maxsip Telecom.

Bloomberg Government's 2024 report identified Stonington Global as one of the fastest-growing lobbying firms. In 2025, Stonington Global secured one of the market's largest contracts, according to Politico. In 2025, the firm signed a $600,000 deal with TL Management.

== Personal life ==
Muzin is an Orthodox Jew. He resides in Silver Spring, Maryland with his 3 children.
