= Medelsheim (surname) =

Medelsheim is a surname. Notable people with the surname include:

- Herz Cerfbeer of Medelsheim (1730–1793), French Jewish philanthropist
- Maximilien Charles Alphonse Cerfberr of Medelsheim (1817—1883), French journalist, writer, and governmental official
- Samson Cerfberr of Medelsheim (1780–1826), French soldier and author
