= Joey Allaham =

American lobbyist

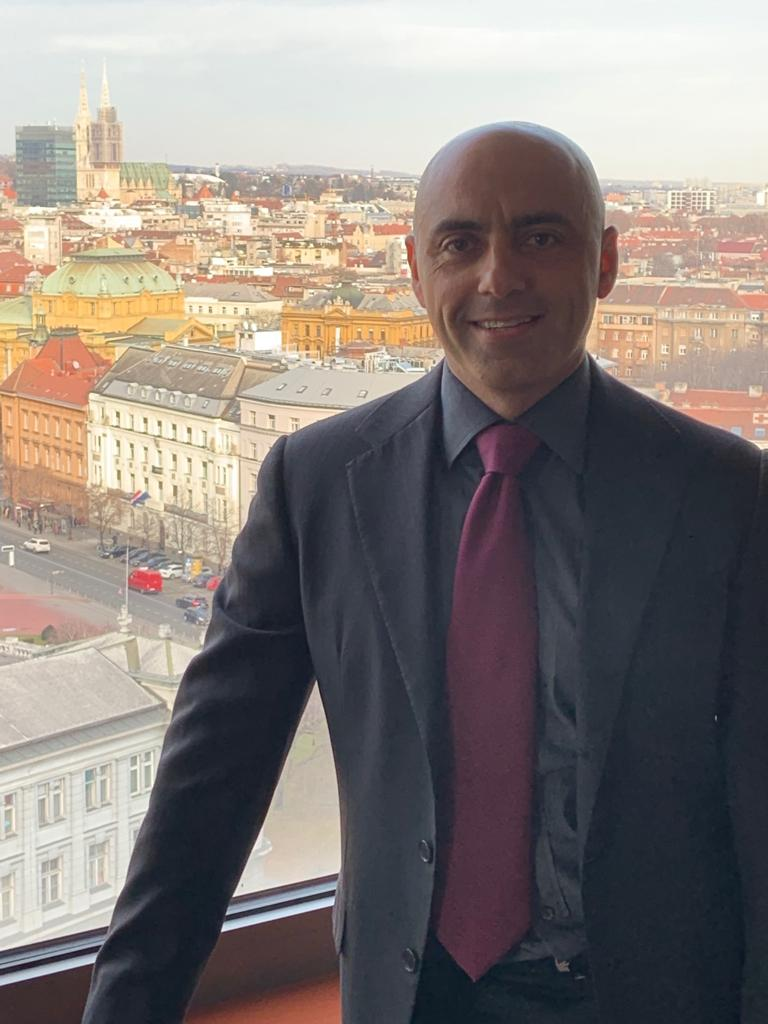
- Born: Damascus, Syria
- Occupation: Businessperson

Joey Allaham is a lobbyist and former New York City restaurant entrepreneur. He founded a number of restaurants in New York including Prime Grill, Prime KO, and others. From 2017 to 2018, Allaham was a lobbyist for the government of Qatar. The New York Times describes him as an "international fixer".

== Career ==
Joey Allaham was born in Damascus and grew up in a Syrian Jewish family of butchers. They left in 1992 and Joey moved to New York City in 1993.

Allaham became known for his luxury kosher restaurants, especially Prime Grill, which was seen as New York's first high-end kosher steakhouse. Prime Grill was named the city's top kosher restaurant for eight years in a row by Zagat. Allaham started three other upscale kosher restaurants – Solo (a Mediterranean-Asian fusion restaurant), Prime KO (a Japanese steakhouse), and Prime at the Bentley – as well as Prime Butcher Baker (an Ashkenazi and Sephardic gourmet food store). He founded Prime Hospitality Group, a company that offered kosher catering to resorts. Allaham has managed to collaborate with a number of government and international officials, as well as other prominent business people through his restaurant businesses.

In 2013, he published The Prime Grill Cookbook, a kosher cookbook, with David Kolotkin.

== Qatar lobbying ==
Joey Allaham started helping Qatar make political investments and affiliations with the American Jewish community. Allaham emerged as a prominent behind-the-scenes figure in stateside battles associated with the Gulf crisis and other incidents. Allaham started working with Nicolas Muzin in 2017. According to some sources, Allaham was paid by the Qataris for "introducing Qatari officials to Muzin and to other influential Republicans." Allaham said he arranged meetings for Qatari officials and "distributed several charitable donations as an introductory show of goodwill," but did not "lobby any public officials or conduct any public relations work." In September 2017, "Muzin registered with the Justice Department as a foreign agent for Qatar."

Joey Allaham's firm, Lexington Strategies, received funds in 2017 from Qatar firm Blue Fort Public Relations LLC to "foster commercial and international investment-related outreach opportunities for private companies and investors from Qatar into the United States." Allaham succeeded in arranging prominent pro-Israel figures to visit Qatar. Allaham also managed to arrange meetings in the U.S. between Qatari officials and some of Donald Trump's associates.

In concert with Muzin, "Allaham took the lead in introducing Qataris to prominent American Jewish figures. He offered them trips to Doha, where they could meet with Qatari Emir Tamim bin Hamad al-Thani and other government officials... The outreach to Jewish leaders organized by Allaham has been a small piece of Qatar's campaign to generate goodwill among individuals who may have Trump's ear." American Jewish leaders who accepted trips organized by Allaham or Muzin included Alan Dershowitz, head of the Zionist Organization of America Mort Klein, Malcolm Hoenlein, and Menachem Genack, "a rabbi who is CEO of the Orthodox Union Kosher Division, which oversees certification of thousands of kosher food facilities around the world." In potential violation of the Foreign Agents Registration Act (FARA), Allaham did not register with the Justice Department as a foreign agent of Qatar during the time frame in which he worked for the country.

On June 7, Allaham consequently told Politico that he recently cut ties with Qatar, a day after Muzin declared on Twitter that he had stopped working for Qatar. He informed Politico "that he would register with the Justice Department as a foreign agent for the work he performed for Qatar." Allaham also implicated former Qatari diplomat Ahmed Al-Rumaihi, who he said asked him "lie to the press that Steve Bannon had maliciously created" a lawsuit against him.

On June 15, Allaham retroactively registered with the Justice Department as a foreign agent for Qatar. He listed his clients as the "State of Qatar" and the "Supreme Committee for Delivery and Legacy," specifying his respective official points of contact for each as Emir Tamim bin Hamad Al Thani and the younger brother of the emir, Mohammed bin Hamad bin Khalifa Al Thani.

In his disclosures, Allaham reported that, on behalf of Qatar, he paid Mike Huckabee $50,000 for visiting Qatar and donated $100,000 to the Zionist Organization of America (ZOA), half of which was only transferred after the head of the ZOA, Mort Klein, visited Qatar in early January 2018. Allaham said he disbursed this money from $1.45 million paid him for "'community engagement' to benefit Qatar—actions that included making 'charitable contributions and arranging meetings in the United States and visits to Qatar.'"

Allaham singled out for praise the help Qatar provided by ZOA president Klein, noting in a June 21, 2018 Jerusalem Post report that he was "proud of the work that Mort Klein has done... in collaboration with the Emir and other members of the Qatari Royal Family." Klein denied this, however, saying he "never in any way lobbied for Qatar," and noted that the donation to the ZOA was rejected and returned.

Allaham filed his foreign lobbying activities on behalf of the Qatari government with the Justice Department in June 2018, where donations to pro-Israel organizations the Zionist Organization of America and Our Soldiers Speak (OSS) were listed. In June 2018 Allaham disclosed the payments in a filing to register as an agent of a foreign government.

Allaham was instrumental in an "unconventional" lobbying campaign for Qatar during the Trump administration. Allaham and a lobbying-business partner earned more than $3 million from Qatar, which had sought to win over Trump's allies and associates, amid a regional dispute and allegations of supporting terrorism. However, Allaham settled a lawsuit filed by Republican fundraiser Elliott Broidy and admitted to knowing about the Qatari hack of Broidy's emails before the news of it broke out.

According to a 2024 Washington Post report, Allaham facilitated introductions between Newsmax CEO Christopher Ruddy and Qatari sovereign wealth fund officials in early 2018 regarding a potential Qatari investment in Newsmax. Allaham revealed that he was excluded from further negotiations and not informed about the subsequent $50 million investment deal involving Qatar's ruling Al Thani family.

== Israel–Indonesia normalization work ==
In 2020, Allaham and Indonesian politician Luhut Binsar Pandjaitan donated 15,000 units of Taffix, an Israeli anti-COVID-19 nasal spray, to Indonesian health workers and military personnel. In 2021, Allaham began working on Israel-Indonesia diplomatic ties, and established Israeli collaboration with Indonesian Defence Minister Prabowo Subianto.

In 2023, Allaham worked toward establishing bilateral trade between Israel and Indonesia, with a formal normalization agreement expected to be announced in October. Allaham set up negotiations between Andi Widjajanto, a senior advisor to the then Indonesian President Joko Widodo, and Ronen Levy, the director-general of the Israeli foreign ministry and a "key player" in the Abraham Accords.

The announcement was put on hold when the Gaza war began on October 7, 2023, following which Allaham repurposed the backchannel of communication between Widjajanto and Levy to evacuate Indonesian aid workers trapped in Gaza. Allaham coordinated with Judha Nugraha, who was director for the Protection of Citizens at the Indonesian Ministry of Foreign Affairs, as well as Israel's Coordinator of Government Activities in the Territories, to facilitate the passage of Indonesians from Gaza into Egypt.
