= Mohab Mostafa Al Sayed Qasim =

Mohab Mostafa Al Sayed Qasim (Arabic: مهاب مصطفى السيد قاسم) is the suspected ringleader of an Egyptian terrorist cell responsible for carrying out the December 2016 Botroseya Church bombing. Following the bombing, Qasim's 2015 trip to Qatar became the subject of a controversy over alleged Qatari ties to the terrorist attack.

== Background ==
Mohab Mostafa Al Sayed Qasim was born on November 2, 1986, in Egypt. His brother, Mohsen El Sayed Qasim, was born in December 1981 and was a member of the terrorist cell led by Mohab Qasim responsible for carrying out the Botroseya Church bombing. Mohab Mostafa Al Sayed Qasim's "militant name" is "The Doctor."

== Terrorist attack ==
On December 11, 2016, a suicide bomber killed 29 people and injured 47 others after detonating a bomb at St. Peter and St. Paul's Church in Cairo. The suicide bomber was later identified as Mahmoud Shafiq Mohammed Mustafa. According to a statement made by Egypt's Ministry of Interior, Mustafa belonged to a terrorist cell led by Mohab Qasim.

Egyptian police conducted a raid on the terrorist cell's hideout in Cairo's Zeitoun district on December 12, 2016. During the raid, authorities arrested four members of the cell and found two explosive belts and other materials used to make explosives. The arrested members of the terrorist cell led by Mohab Qasim were identified as Ramy Mohamed Abdel-Ghany and his wife Ola Hussein Ali, Mohamed Hamdy Abdel-Ghany, and the brother of Mohab Qasim, Mohsen El Sayed Qasim.

Ramy Mohamed Abdel-Ghany is suspected of having provided refuge for suicide bomber Mahmoud Mustafa as well as preparing him and hiding the explosives.

The Muslim Brotherhood denied involvement with the suicide attack. ISIS later claimed responsibility for the attack.

== Controversy between Egypt and Qatar ==
The statement issued by Egypt's Ministry of Interior claimed that Mohab Qasim received financial and logistical support from Muslim Brotherhood leaders based in Qatar.

According to the statement, Qasim traveled to Qatar in 2015 and met with Muslim Brotherhood leaders.[xii] Qasim was allegedly offered financial and logistical support to carry out attacks in Egypt. Upon returning to Egypt, Qasim reportedly traveled to North Sinai where he met with members of Ansar Beit El-Maqdis to receive training on using weapons and making explosives.

Following his visit to North Sinai, Qasim was allegedly given permission by Qatar-based Muslim Brotherhood leaders to carry out attacks against Egypt's Coptic Christians in hopes of furthering sectarian divides in Egypt. The Ministry of the Interior claimed that Qasim was behind a call made by the Egyptian Revolutionary Council for attacks against Egypt's Copts for their support for the government of Abdel Fattah el-Sisi.

=== GCC and Qatari response ===
The Secretary-General of the Gulf Cooperation Council, Abdullatif bin Rashid Al Zayani, condemned Egypt's accusations of Qatari involvement in the suicide attack on Thursday, December 15. Al Zayani claimed that "unverified statements could harm the strong relations between the GCC and Egypt."

Qatar's Ministry of Foreign Affairs and Director of the Qatari Information Office Ahmed Al-Rumaihi condemned Egypt's accusations. In a statement reported by the Qatar News Agency (QNA), Al Rumaihi acknowledged that Qasim arrived in Qatar on December 3, 2015, on an entry visit visa, but claimed that Qatari authorities did not receive a request to detain the suspect or prevent him from entering Qatar.

Ahmed Al Rumaihi also stated that the State of Qatar "rejects terrorism in all its forms regardless of its motives, as well as Qatar’s rejection to any threat to the security of the Egyptian people."
