= Cerf =

Cerf or CERF may refer to:

- CERF (Central Emergency Response Fund), a United Nations fund created to aid regions threatened by disaster
- Coastal and Estuarine Research Federation (CERF)
- Cerf (surname)
- Cerf Island, Seychelles
- Cerf Island, Providence Atoll, Seychelles
- HMS Cerf (1803), a brig (also named Cerf) captured from the French

== See also ==
- Île aux Cerfs
- Les Éditions du Cerf, a French publisher
