= Bashew's =

- Type: Soft drink
- Manufacturer: Chill Beverages
- Country of origin: South Africa
- Region of origin: Western Cape
- Introduced: 1899; 126 years ago
- Website: chillbev.co.za/bashews

Bashew's is a South African brand of carbonated soft drinks. Founded by the Bashew brothers in Cape Town in 1899, it is currently manufactured by the Stellenbosch-based company Chill Beverages. Because of its long history, it has been described as a part of South Africa's cultural heritage.

== History ==
The Bashew brothers Marx and Harry were born into the Jewish family of Zemach and Rachel Shabashewitz in Raseiniai, Lithuania in 1876 and 1878 respectively. At a young age, they immigrated to the Cape Colony like many other Lithuanian Jews did at the time. South Africa was a popular destination because of its rapidly growing economy based on trade and diamond mining. Soon after the move, they shortened their Yiddish-origin last name Shabashewitz to Bashew to make it easier to pronounce for the English and Afrikaans speakers who surrounded them in Cape Town.

Marx and Harry Bashew launched their soft drink brand in 1899, when the Second Boer War brought thousands of British soldiers to Africa. As many of them had no prior exposure to South Africa's hot and dry climate, an increased demand in refreshing drinks appeared among those temporarily stationed in Green Point Common on their way to the North. The Bashew brothers saw an opportunity and put up an offer to the army authorities which was accepted. Soon afterwards, they rented a room in central Cape Town that became their first manufacturing plant.

After the war, the Bashew brothers continued producing soft drinks, now catering to the civilian population. In 1903, the plant moved to a larger premises in Cape Town's District Six. In 1913, the company needed another expansion and the Bashew brothers built a factory of their own on Searle Street, descibred as a "landmark of its day". After the death of Harry Bashew in 1947 and Marx Bashew less than two years later, Bashew Brothers Pty. Ltd. remained a family business headed by Harry's son Charles Bashew and Marx's son-in-law Felix Heymann. In 1951, they purchased a new manufacturing plant in Epping. Four years later, the company established franchise agreements with several international brands including 7 Up and began manufacturing the American lemon-lime-flavored drink for the local market.

In 1959, Charles Bashew and Felix Heymann sold the company to Ismail Mammon, a local businessman. Mammon's son Moosa headed the company since his death in 1991 and until he sold it to Zahir Williams and Mehboob Adams in 2009. One year later, Williams and Adams partnered with Chill Beverages International. In 2016, Chill Beverages acquired sole ownership of the Bashew's brand.

== Variations ==
Chill Beverages currently produces 7 types of soft drinks under the Bashew's brand: Pineapple, Cream Soda, Iron Brew, Raspberry, Cocopine, Orange and Ginger Beer. In 2017, a seasonal limited edition drink called Harry's Cola Tribute Edition was manufactured to commemorate 70 years since Harry Bashew's death.
