= Directorate of Indonesian Citizen Protection =

- Direktorat Pelindungan Warga Negara Indonesia

Directorate overview
- Formed: February 1, 2002; 24 years ago
- Employees: 64 (Note: 50 diplomats and 14 contract employees) (2024)
- Annual budget: Rp 45,061,892,000 (December 2024)
- Directorate executive: Heni Hamidah, Director

The Directorate of Indonesian Citizen Protection (Indonesian: Direktorat Pelindungan Warga Negara Indonesia) is a specialized agency within the Indonesian foreign ministry tasked with safeguarding the interests and welfare of Indonesian nationals. Established on 1 February 2002, the directorate serves as the primary government body responsible for consular protection, social assistance, and the repatriation of citizens. Until 7 October 2021, the directorate was known as the Directorate of Indonesian Citizen and Legal Entities Protection.

The directorate's formation was a response to the 1999 foreign relations law and Indonesia's obligations under the Vienna Convention on Consular Relations, which grants diplomatic missions the right to protect their citizens. Under recent administrations, it has undergone significant modernization, including the launch of digital platforms like the Peduli WNI and Safe Travel apps to streamline citizen self-reporting and emergency response.

== History ==
The directorate's existence could be traced back to Indonesia's ratification of the 1963 Vienna Convention on Consular Relations in 1982. Article 5 of the convention stipulated the rights of diplomatic representatives of a country to protects its citizens and legal entities abroad. These functions were further emphasized by the Indonesian foreign relations law of 1999, which mandated the foreign ministry to, among others, protect Indonesian citizens abroad.

Following the appointment of Hassan Wirajuda as foreign minister by the Megawati Sukarnoputri administration, Indonesian citizen protection became one of the foreign ministry's top priorities. The issue prompted Wirajuda to establish the Directorate of Indonesian Citizen and Legal Entities Protection on 1 February 2002 through a ministerial decree. The directorate's establishment was part of a massive overhaul from the department's prior function-based organization to a regional-based organization. Its first director, Sjachwien Adenan, was installed on 1 March 2002.

A 2006 decree issued by the foreign ministry reorganized agencies within the foreign ministry, including the directorate. According to the decree, the directorate's main function was to protect Indonesian citizens and legal entities domestically and abroad, supervise consular services, and provide social assistance and repatriate Indonesian citizens. Based on this functions, the directorate was split into four different subdirectorates, each headed by a chief (in English the chief is usually referred to as a deputy director) and a single administrative subsection:

- subdirectorate of protection of Indonesian citizen and legal entities abroad
- subdirectorate of protection of Indonesian citizens in Indonesia
- subdirectorate of consular supervision
- subdirectorate of social assistance and repatriation
- subsection for administrative affairs

This organisational arrangement of the directorate remained in place following reorganizations within the foreign ministry in 2011. The foreign minister's decree number 2 of 2016, dated 18 April 2016, restructured the directorate from function-based subdirectorates to regional-based subdirectorate. The directorate now consisted of four regional subdirectorates, a subdirectorate for managing institutional affairs and protection diplomacy, and a subsection for administrative affairs:

- area I subdirectorate (responsible for countries in Southeast Asia and North America)
- area II subdirectorate (responsible for countries in Europe and Gulf Cooperation Council countries)
- area III subdirectorate (responsible for countries in South Asia, Central Asia, Africa, South America, Caribbean, and the Pacific Ocean)
- area IV subdirectorate (responsible for countries in East Asia and Middle East, outside of the Gulf Cooperation Council countries)
- subdirectorate for institutional affairs and protection diplomacy
- subsection for administrative affairs

On 7 October 2021, the foreign minister issued a decree which renamed the directorate into the Directorate of Indonesian Citizen Protection. The responsibility for protecting legal entities was transferred into another directorate to allow the directorate to focus on citizens. The decree also changed the word for protection within the directorate's name, with the less common pelindungan being used instead of the more common perlindungan. Pelindungan refers to the act of protection, while perlindungan refers to the place of protection.

The directorate also underwent a major reorganization, with the four regional subdirectorate reduced into three and the establishment of a new subdirectorate responsible for the technological system of Indonesian citizen and consular services. The directorate's organization were now as follows:

- Southeast Asia region subdirectorate
- Middle East region subdirectorate
- Other regions outside Southeast Asia and Middle East subdirectorate
- subdirectorate for institutional affairs and protection diplomacy
- subdirectorate for information system and technology for consular services and protection of Indonesian citizens
- subsection for administrative affairs

== Developments ==
Since its formation, citizen services were established at six different embassies in Singapore, Seoul, Bandar Seri Begawan, Amman, Doha, and Damascus. The services was expanded in 2008 to cover Indonesian embassies in Abu Dhabi, Riyadh, Kuwait, Kuala Lumpur and consulate generals in Johor Bahru, Hong Kong, Kota Kinabalu, Jeddah, and Dubai. On 7 August 2009, the directorate received a ISO 9001:2008 certificate for Indonesian citizen repatriation.

Under director Tatang Razak, the directorate formulated a grand plan to improve its service to Indonesian citizen abroad. The three major steps in protecting Indonesian citizens involve prevention through harmonization and coordination to oversee the sending of Indonesian migrant workers in accordance with procedures, the Indonesian migrant worker database; early direction through welcoming program and hotline services; and immediate response.

During foreign minister Retno Marsudi's tenure, major reforms on the Indonesian citizen protection system were conducted through digitalization. The directorate integrated available databases and launched applications to assist Indonesians in self reporting their presence abroad. These applications include the web-based Peduli WNI app for self-reporting and the mobile Safe Travel app for short-term travelers, which was launched in 2018. The directorate also initiated the establishment of a digital command center to consolidate protection-related data from various agencies into a single big data system and cooperated with domestic and foreign institutions to improve its digital facilities.

== Directors ==
- Sjachwien Adenan (1 March 2002 – 2004)
- Ferry Adamhar (2004 – 27 March 2007)
- Teguh Wardoyo (27 March 2007 – 3 September 2010)
- Tatang Budie Utama Razak (3 September 2010 – 2014)
- Lalu Muhamad Iqbal (2014 – 2019; acting until 5 October 2016)
- Judha Nugraha (2019 – 20 October 2025)
- Heni Hamidah (20 October 2025 – now; acting until 9 April 2026)
