= Shabtai (society) =

Jewish discussion society based in New Haven, Connecticut, USA

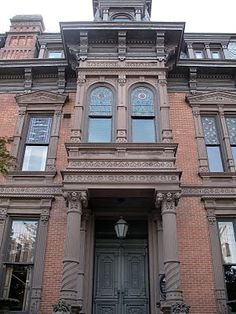
- The John C. Anderson Mansion, built 1882
- Formation: 1996
- Type: Jewish leadership society
- Headquarters: Yale University
- Location: New Haven, Connecticut, United States
- Director: Toby Hecht
- Formerly called: Eliezer, or Chai Society

Shabtai (Note: /ˈʃæbtaɪ/; Hebrew: שַׁבְּתַי, romanized: Shabtay) (formerly known as Eliezer and Chai Society) is a global Jewish leadership society based at Yale University. Like other independent student societies at Yale, Shabtai is not officially affiliated with the university. Shabtai's exclusive membership boasts a diverse group of Yale students, alumni, and current and former faculty. Time magazine has referred to Shabtai as Yale's "modish club du jour" and as the campus' "secret society of a different stripe."

== History ==
Founded in 1996 by graduate students Ben Karp, Noah Feldman, Michael Alexander, future senator and presidential candidate Cory Booker, and Shmully Hecht, a Rabbi of the Chabad Lubavitch Movement, the society was formed to bring together Jewish and non-Jewish leaders on Yale's campus in an intellectual salon setting influenced by secular and religious branches of Judaism. The society hosts weekly Shabbat dinner meetings in New Haven, featuring a discussion-based format and an ethos of mutual improvement that has been likened to Benjamin Franklin's Junto Club. As one journalist described it, "like Yale's famous secret societies, Shabtai is elite and exclusive, but unlike the infamous Skull & Bones or Scroll & Key or Book & Snake, it is not clandestine." Another described it as facilitating "the kind of conversations around the Shabbat table that bring together secular and sectarian, poor and rich, Muslim and Jew, student and scholar, Mormon and pagan and jock and genius." In 2014, a gift by Benny Shabtai and family facilitated the purchase of the Anderson Mansion, a late-nineteenth century mansion in New Haven's Orange Street Historic District.

=== Yale 300 ===
In celebration of Yale's tercentennial in 2001, the society created the Yale 300 project, a series of recorded interviews with 300 prominent Jewish alumni of Yale from various disciplines and walks of life. Participants included Stephen A. Schwarzman, Henry Winkler, Alan Dershowitz, Floyd Abrams, Peter Beinart, Dan Rose, Steven Brill, Susan Crown, Rob Glaser, Paul Goldberger, Jeff Greenfield, Samuel Heyman, Donna Dubinsky, Richard Levin, Robert Pozen, Gideon Rose, Robert Baker, Jonathan F. Rose, Jonathan Rothberg, Joshua Bekenstein, Robert Stern, Stephen Susman, Calvin Trillin, and Wendy Wasserstein, among many others.

=== Shabtai Global ===
In 2019, Shabtai began expanding from its base in New Haven to host intimate discussions in homes of members and friends around the world, in such cities as New York, Los Angeles and Tel Aviv, following a kickoff event hosted by campus member and pharmaceutical executive Vivek Ramaswamy. Attendees are drawn from leaders across industries and professions, as well as artists, public intellectuals, and recent alumni. In order to reach a wider audience, a selection of events also began to be made public on Shabtai TV, including debates, conversations, dinners and farbrengens.

== Activities ==
In reflection of its Jewish values, the society has held events to highlight social justice issues and promote interfaith dialogue and connectivity. In 2018, it held a screening of Academy Award-nominated Knife Skills, a film about EDWIN's restaurant in Cleveland, which employs and trains former prisoners to help them readjust and lead successful lives. The screening was attended by New Haven Mayor Toni Harp.

In 2012, the society hosted Israel soldier Gilad Shalit in an event celebrating his release from five years of Hamas captivity the year before. Hundreds of students attended and were addressed by Prof. Charles Hill and dignitaries from the government of Israel. The society hosted Tony Schwartz, ghostwriter of The Art of the Deal, in 2017 to discuss Donald Trump's psychology, motivations, and character, as observed from shadowing him to write the book.

In November 2018, Shabtai hosted criminal justice reform advocate Anthony Ray Hinton at a Yud Tes Kislev event commemorating the anniversary of the release of Shneur Zalman of Liadi from imprisonment by the tsarist Russian police. Hinton discussed the 30 years he spent on death row in Alabama before being freed by forensic evidence that his court-appointed lawyer had failed to request. In December 2018, Shabtai hosted attorney Kristen Gibbons Feden to discuss her prosecution of Bill Cosby on charges of rape. Feden said that the success of the prosecution proved that, increasingly "victims of rape and sexual assault can find justice in our legal institutions, as well as society."

During the Gaza War, Rabbi Hecht hosted Israeli National Security Minister Itamar Ben-Gvir, a far-right ultranationalist previously convicted in Israel of racist incitement and support for terrorist groups, at Shabtai in New Haven. Ben-Gvir's appearances drew hundreds of demonstrators, along with the resignations of several members of Shabtai.

== Notable members ==
The Society’s membership is officially confidential; however, a number of individuals have been publicly identified as members of the Society. These include:

- Cory Booker, United States Senator and former Mayor of Newark
- Nicolas Muzin, political strategist, lobbyist, attorney
- Vivek Ramaswamy, founder of Roivant Sciences, former candidate for the 2024 Republican presidential nomination, and candidate in the 2026 Ohio gubernatorial election
- Noah Feldman, legal scholar and professor at Harvard Law School
- Elbridge Colby, American national security professional and Under Secretary of Defense for Policy
- Michael Knowles, political commentator, author, and media host
- James Kirchick, American reporter and foreign correspondent
- Keith Urbahn, president and founding partner of Javelin, former aide to Donald Rumsfeld and Mitch McConnell
- Michael Alexander, Maimonides Endowed Professor in Jewish Studies in the religious studies department of the University of California, Riverside.

== In published works ==
In Israeli Ambassador Michael Oren's memoir Ally, he describes Shabtai's role in Richard Goldstone's decision to recant the Goldstone Report, which had alleged that Israel deliberately targeted civilians in the 2009 Gaza War. Goldstone's introspection began after meeting Shabtai's Rabbi Hecht at an event on Yale's campus.

New York Times editor Trish Hall describes being persuaded to attend, and then enjoying, a night with Shabtai in her memoir Writing to Persuade.

A fictionalized version of Shabtai and the Anderson Mansion are featured prominently in the Yale-themed occult novel Ninth House by Leigh Bardugo.
