= Trish Hall =

American journalist and writer

- Education: University of California, Berkeley
- Occupations: Journalist, writer
- Notable credit(s): The New York Times; Writing to Persuade

Trish Hall is an American journalist and writer. She worked for The New York Times for more than 20 years, serving in various capacities including masthead editor overseeing six feature sections (2010–2011), op-ed editor (2011–2015), and senior editor (2015–2017). The creation of the "Sunday Review" and "Escapes" sections are among her imprints on the paper.

Hall is the author of Writing to Persuade: How to Bring People Over to Your Side, published by Liveright/Norton in 2019.

== Early life ==
Hall grew up in northeastern Pennsylvania and attended the all-girls Baldwin School ('68) in Bryn Mawr, Pennsylvania in Greater Philadelphia. While there she wrote for the Baldwin Hourglass, the school newspaper. Hall then attended the University of California, Berkeley, where she served as a reporter and then city editor for the student-run newspaper The Daily Californian.

== Career ==
=== Early career ===
After departing Berkeley, Hall worked for several newspapers in Connecticut before landing a job as a copy editor at The Wall Street Journal and then subsequently becoming a food reporter at the paper. She would work for six years at the Journal, where she was credited for introducing into the English language the word "grazing" as a term for tasting small quantities of food.

Hall joined the New York Times in 1986 as a food reporter, continuing to cover the same beat she had at the Wall Street Journal.

=== Martha Stewart Living and freelance work ===
In 1996, Hall left The Times to become executive editor of the magazine Martha Stewart Living. She worked with her on the magazine as well as Stewart's first website and radio show. In 1997, Hall began a six-year stint as a freelancer, columnist, and author. During that time she wrote two books for Martha Stewart (one on color and the other on baking), created and managed the "Escapes" section for the New York Times, and wrote the weekly real estate column "Habitats" for the paper.

With Dr. Z. Paul Lorenc, Hall co-wrote A Little Work: Behind the Doors of a Park Avenue Plastic Surgeon, published by St. Martin's Press in 2004.

=== Return to the New York Times ===
In 2003, Hall returned to the New York Times full-time, serving as Sunday Business Editor through 2004. For several years, she then "held the title Living/Style editor, overseeing the Real Estate, Dining and Home sections and a rotating group of feature reporters," whose work appeared in various sections.

In January 2010, Hall joined the paper's masthead when she was promoted to assistant managing editor for features. In her new role, she retained her previous responsibilities but would now "also oversee the Styles and Travel sections and coordinate lifestyle coverage across the paper," making her responsible for six weekly sections: Dining, Home, Thursday Styles, Travel, Real Estate, and Sunday Styles.

In January 2011, Hall was named op-ed editor of the New York Times, replacing David Shipley. In a memo to staffers announcing Hall's new role, Andrew Rosenthal, editor of the opinion pages, wrote, "I can't think of anyone better suited for a job that has always been hard, requiring a broad range of knowledge and interests, as well as editing, managing and diplomatic skills." During her tenure as Deputy Editorial Page Editor for Op-Ed, Hall created the Sunday Review section and significantly expanded the paper's opinion content online, both domestically and internationally.

In September 2015 Hall was appointed senior editor in charge of sponsorships, a new role the company had never before tried, reporting to New York Times executive editor Dean Baquet. In this newsroom position, she worked on new products, sponsorships, and special sections.

On October 16, 2017, New York Times Deputy Managing Editor Matt Purdy announced Hall's departure from the paper.

==== Further career ====
In June 2019, Liveright/Norton published Writing to Persuade: How to Bring People Over to Your Side, "a book that is part memoir, part self-help, and part writing guide" written by Hall. Afterward, Hall joined Ridgely Walsh, LLC as a managing director where she writes and edit Op Eds on behalf of clients.
