= Osman Gradaščević =

- Born: Bosnia Eyalet, Ottoman Empire
- Military career
- Allegiance: Ottoman Empire
- Service years: 1765–1812
- Rank: captain
- Nickname: Osman-kapetan
- Commands: Captainy of Gradačac

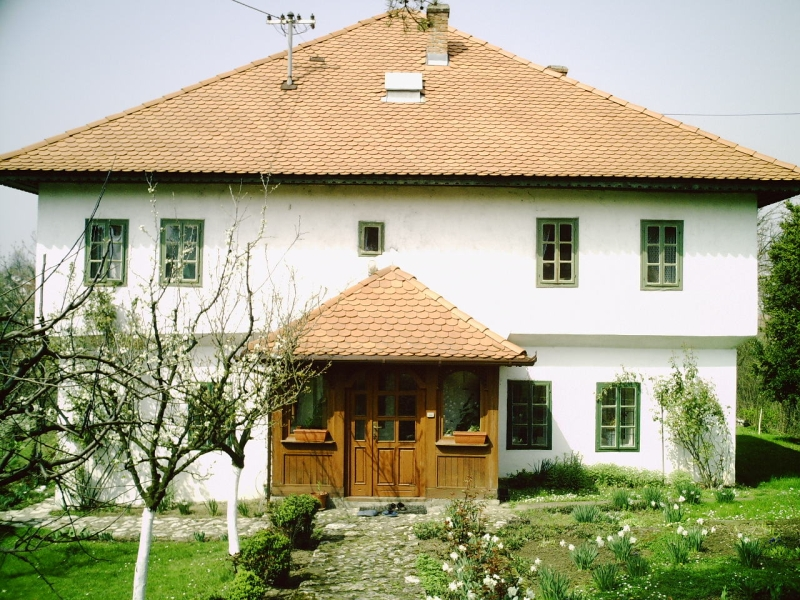
The birth-house of his sons.

Osman Gradaščević (fl. 1765–1812) or Captain Osman (Osman-kapetan) was an Ottoman Bosnian captain of the military captaincy of Gradačac, which he was in control of since 1765. During his rule he was one of the most powerful and richest captains in Bosnia. He was responsible for the construction of the White mosque in Modriča along with a nearby travelers inn, another mosque, and a madrassa with a fountain in Gračanica, as well as another madrassa in Gradačac. In 1808 he also carried on with the previously started renovation of the family castle in Gradačac.

Married to Melek-hanuma, Osman had six heirs. In order of birth they were Hamza, Murat, Osman, Muharrem, Husein, and H. Bećir. After the death of captain Mehmed-beg Kulenović of Zvornik in 1806, Gradaščević received the title of Pasha for leading Bosnian forces against the First Serbian Uprising in 1812. The famed Samson Cerfberr of Medelsheim is known to have served under his command north of Gradačac. Osman Gradaščević died defending and aiding the captains of the Bosnian district of Zvornik against a Serbian incursion in 1812.

Known for his justice, he was killed by Dželaludin Paša, Vizier of Travnik due to his opposing of reforms. His son Murat succeeded him as captain of Gradačac. Husein would go on to become one of the most famous figures in Bosnian history when he led the movement against the Ottoman military reforms of Sultan Mahmud II in 1831 and 1832. He led his rebel forces against the Ottoman armies and defeated them as far as Kosovo.

== See also ==
- Ottoman Empire
- Bosnia Eyalet
- Selim III
- Husein Gradaščević
- Samson Cerfberr of Medelsheim
- Ibrahim Bushati

== Annotations ==
1. In Bosnian, his name is written Osman-kapetan Gradaščević (Осман-капетан Градашчевић), and scarcely as Osman-paša Gradaščević (Осман-паша Градашчевић).
