= Zionist Organization of America =

American non-profit pro-Israel organization

- ארגון ציוני אמריקה
- Abbreviation: ZOA
- Formation: 1897; 129 years ago
- Type: 501(c)(3) organization
- Tax ID no.: 13-5628475
- Members: 25,000
- Leader: Morton Klein
- Website: zoa.org
- Formerly called: Federation of American Zionists

The Zionist Organization of America (ZOA; Hebrew: ההסתדרות הציונית האמריקאית, romanized: ha-Histadrut ha-Ṣiyonit ha-ʾAmeriqʾit), known as the Federation of American Zionists during 1897–1917, is an American nonprofit pro-Israel organization. Founded in 1897, as the Federation of American Zionists, it was the first official Zionist organization in the United States. Early in the 20th century, it was the primary representative of American Jews to the World Zionist Organization.

Today, the ZOA claims to have 25,000 members, down from its 1939 peak of 165,000.

The ZOA opposes Palestinian statehood.

== History ==
=== Founding ===
The ZOA was initially founded in 1897 as the Federation of American Zionists (FAZ), an amalgam of Hebrew societies, Chovevei Zion, and Jewish nationalist clubs that all endorsed the Basel program of the First Zionist Congress. Initially founded as an organization for the greater New York area, the FAZ was established as a national organization at a conference in New York the next year where the constitution was adopted by the delegates with Richard Gottheil elected as president and Stephen S. Wise as honorary secretary. The FAZ was meant to support the founding of the 'Jewish National Home in Palestine'. Along with its sister organization, Hadassah Women's Zionist Organization of America, founded 1912, as well as the Labor Zionist Po'ale Zion parties, and the Religious Zionist Mizrachi, the ZOA served as one of the key voices in early American Zionism. Their voice was limited however, since most American Jews and the organized American Jewish Committee were initially strong opponents of the Zionist movement, and worried, with their assimilationist views, about charges of 'dual loyalty', a common antisemitic canard.

In 1917, the FAZ was renamed as the ZOA.

=== Louis Brandeis ===
When the secular "people's lawyer" Louis Brandeis became involved in the movement in 1912, just before World War I, support for Zionism increased. By 1917, Brandeis' leadership had increased American Zionist membership ten times to 200,000 members, and "American Jewry thenceforth became the financial center for the world Zionist movement," greatly surpassing its previous European base of support. In addition, during the early years of World War I, he and others established the American Provisional Executive Committee for General Zionist Affairs to run Zionist affairs on behalf of the worldwide Zionist Organization, which had been rendered largely impotent because its members were divided by allegiance to the different sides in the conflict.

== Connections to the state of Israel ==
In 1949, the Federal Bureau of Investigation investigated the ZOA under the 1938 Foreign Agents Registration Act after the organization solicited supporters to accelerate technology transfers to Jews in Palestine. On February 25, 1948, the ZOA was ordered to register as a foreign agent. After a series of conferences with the US Attorney General, the ZOA changed its constitution and "affected a change in the constitution of the World Zionist Organization in an effort to remove itself from agency status. As a result, all attempts to procure the registration of the subject organization were dropped."

Following the founding of Israel, and to unify Jewish representation with the executive branch of US government, the ZOA became a charter member of the Conference of Presidents of Major American Jewish Organizations. ZOA was historically a liberal Zionist group, though it has since become right-wing.

The ZOA helped mobilized political support in the United States for Israel, with large scale funding and pressure on Washington and on public opinion. Emanuel Neumann and Abba Hillel Silver were two leaders of the ZOA. They felt its massive funding legitimized taking a major role in shaping Israeli government policy . They opposed the social and economic policies of Prime Minister David Ben-Gurion and his Mapai (Labor) Party, according to historian Zohar Segev. Their interventions were rejected and Israeli politicians agreed that American Zionists had a major role in funding but not in policy guidance.

== Recent history ==
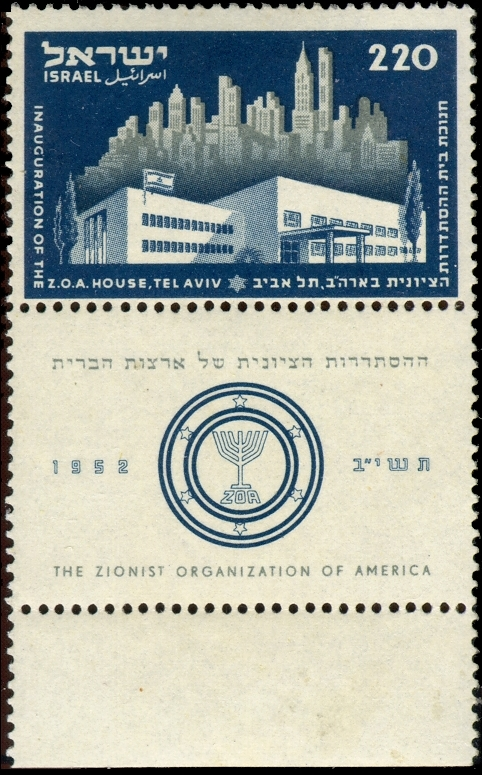
Israeli stamp commemorating the inauguration of the Z.O.A. House in Tel Aviv

In 1994, Morton Klein became president.

In 2005, the Los Angeles branch of ZOA elected former actor and singer Ed Ames as president. Tom Tugend of The Jewish Journal of Greater Los Angeles noted that Ames' career was far behind him and made particular note of his role as an actor on the Daniel Boone TV series, before going on to say, "Founded in 1896, ZOA had been in decline from its heyday under the leadership of Louis Brandeis and Rabbi Abba Hillel Silver, but has regained some prominence since the energetic and vocal Klein assumed the presidency 10 years ago," having been elected in 1993 and assuming office in 1994.

The ZOA was strongly opposed to Israel's decision to withdraw from the Gaza Strip in 2005. In January 2009, the ZOA issued a statement calling on supporters of the withdrawal to apologize, stating that the "past three years of rapid security deterioration in the southern part of Israel," and that "in these circumstances, it is high time for all MKs, journalists and others, regardless of party affiliation, who supported the process of unilateral withdrawal to apologize to the Israeli electorate."

In January 2009, the ZOA expressed concern about President Barack Obama's selection of George J. Mitchell as an envoy to the Middle East. The ZOA criticized Mitchell because he "believes both sides are equally at fault" and that "settlements are the main problem, not the Palestinian Arabs' refusal to end terrorism." ZOA was also opposed to the selection of Charles W. Freeman, Jr. as chairman of the National intelligence Council in February, 2009. He withdrew from the post on March 10, 2009.

In 2012 ZOA lost its charitable status in the United States, having failed to provide the Internal Revenue Service with tax returns for three consecutive years. The tax-exempt status was restored by the IRS in 2013.

In 2020, the ZOA supported annexation ("applying Israeli sovereignty") of parts of the West Bank. In the same year it lauded then-President Trump's appointment of Richard Grenell as acting National Intelligence Director, stating "There has never been a better friend of a strong U.S-Israel relationship than Ambassador Grenell".

=== Qatar controversy ===
In January 2018, ZOA president Mort Klein went on a paid trip to Qatar to meet with the Emir, at his invitation; he also met with a number of senior officials. The visit was strongly criticized by some supporters of Israel, and according to Mother Jones magazine, the trip coincided with a softening of the ZOA's stance regarding that country. Shortly after Klein's trip to Qatar, he expressed to the Israeli newspaper Haaretz a new attitude about dialogue with Qatar. In a subsequent March 2018 interview, Klein praised Qatar for flying an Israeli flag at a recent handball tournament and said the Emir told him that "last summer they stopped funding terrorist groups."

On June 19, 2018, Mother Jones reported that Qatar had donated $100,000 to the ZOA through lobbyist Joey Allaham, who also invited former Qatari diplomat Ahmed Al-Rumaihi to ZOA's annual gala on November 17. Allaham's role in the payments to ZOA from Qatar were revealed when a judge ruled that he had to hand over his records of ties to that country. On June 21, Allaham told the Jerusalem Post that he is "proud of the work that Mort Klein has done and all the other Jewish leaders working in collaboration with the Emir and other members of the Qatari Royal Family." ZOA returned the contributions after they were found to not have come from Allaham personally.

== Current activities ==
The ZOA today works to strengthen U.S.-Israel relations through educational activities, by combating what it perceives as anti-Israel bias in the media, textbooks, travel guides, and on college campuses. The ZOA also sponsors educational and cultural programs in Israel. The "ZOA House" is a cultural center in Tel Aviv. The ZOA is responsible for founding the Kfar Silver school, which provides education and vocational training for new Jewish immigrants and others on a 500-acre (2.0 km^{2}) campus near Ashkelon. The ZOA's youth division sponsors one of the largest programs for sending young Jews to visit Israel.

The Brandeis Award is given annually to a prominent national or international figure. Recipients include Miriam Adelson, Joe Biden, Abba Eban, Justice Arthur Goldberg, Ronald Lauder, Natan Sharansky, Simon Wiesenthal, Elizabeth Taylor, Mortimer Zuckerman, Raanan Gissin and Frank Gaffney.

=== Defender of Israel Awards ===
The Zionist Organization presents the 'Defender of Israel' award annually to those who have made major contributions in strengthening U.S.-Israel Relations. US National Security Adviser John Bolton was presented with the Defender of Israel award on November 5, 2018.

== Media ==
On January 8, 2019, The Times of Israel reported that the Conference of Presidents of Major American Jewish Organizations reprimanded the ZOA for insulting other members. The report continued that ZOA resorted to making "insults, ad hominem attacks and name-calling." It further stated that "ZOA knew, or should have known, that its repeated, patterned public criticisms of two of the complainants were unnecessarily shrill and personally directed, and that they would be seen as personal or organizational insults as much, or more, than they would be seen as substantive criticisms".

On February 26, 2019, the ZOA was quoted in a Jewish News Syndicate reported amid American Jewish criticism over the Otzma Yehudit Party. The ZOA quote in the story states: "It's strange, troubling and hypocritical that the Anti-Defamation League, AIPAC, the American Jewish Committee and the Israel Policy Forum condemned the technical merger of two small right-wing pro-Israeli political parties, Otzma Yehudit (Jewish Strength) and Bayit Yehudi (Jewish Home), but remained silent about mergers of anti-Israel Arab parties led by Arab Knesset members who oppose the Jewish state's existence and engage in outright treacherous conduct, including assisting Palestinian Arab terrorists and inciting anti-Jewish terror."

== See also ==
- American Zionist Movement
- Association of Reform Zionists of America
- Emanuel Neumann
- Israel lobby in the United States
- J Street
- Mercaz USA
- Nefesh B'Nefesh
- Religious Zionists of America
