= Frija Zoaretz =

Israeli politician

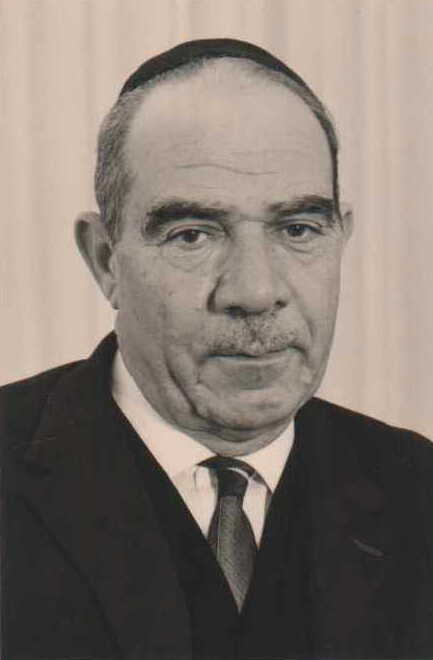
- Zoaretz during his time in the Knesset

Faction represented in the Knesset
- 1955–1969: National Religious Party

Personal details
- Born: 7 December 1907 Tripoli, Libya
- Died: 30 April 1993 (aged 85)

Frija Zoaretz (Hebrew: פריג'א זוארץ; 7 December 1907 – 30 April 1993) was an Israeli politician who served as a member of the Knesset for the National Religious Party between 1955 and 1969.

== Biography ==
Born in Libya, Zoaretz worked as a teacher, and was a Zionist activist. During World War II he was interned at the Italian Qarqarish internment camp in Libya. After the war he emigrated to Israel in 1949 and became chairman of the Libyan Community Committee. He also joined the National Religious Party and was elected to the Knesset on its list in 1955. He was re-elected in 1959 and 1961. Although he lost his seat in the November 1965 elections, he returned to the Knesset as a replacement for Shabtai Daniel on 1 December the same year. He lost his seat for a second and final time in the 1969 elections.

He died in 1993 at the age of 85.
