= Ferdinand P. Beer =

French mechanical engineer (1915–2003)

- Born: August 8, 1915; Binic, France
- Died: April 30, 2003 (aged 87); Bethlehem, Pennsylvania
- Education: M.S. University of Paris; Sc.D University of Geneva
- Spouse: Vivienne C.M. Beer
- Children: Marguerite V. Schaeffer, Dr. Michelle C.M. Beer
- Engineering career
- Discipline: Mechanics
- Institutions: Lehigh University, Williams College

Ferdinand Pierre Beer (August 8, 1915 – April 30, 2003) was a French mechanical engineer and university professor. He spent most of his career as a member of the faculty at Lehigh University, where he served as the chairman of the mechanics and mechanical engineering departments. His most significant contribution was the co-authorship of several textbooks in the field of mechanics, which have been widely cited and utilized in engineering education.

== Biography ==
=== Early life ===
Beer was born in Binic, France in 1915. He received a Masters of Science degree from the Sorbonne and conducted post-graduate work at Brown University. From the University of Geneva in Switzerland, he earned a mathematics license in 1935 and a Doctor of Science degree in 1937. Beer served in the French Army during the Second World War before moving to the United States and took a job at Williams College. He remained there for four years, where he taught as part of the school's collaborative arts/engineering program with the Massachusetts Institute of Technology.

=== Career at Lehigh University ===
In 1947, he arrived at Lehigh University, where he taught for 37 years. When a department of mechanics was formed in 1957, Beer was named its first chairman. In 1968, Beer became the chairman of the Mechanical Engineering and Mechanics Department after the two separate fields were merged into one department. He served in that capacity until 1977. In 1970, Beer was named the chairman of the newly formed University Forum, which was composed of 125 students and faculty members with the goal of promoting discussion between the two bodies. Lehigh professor Fazil Erdogan said that, while "at other universities around the country, students were rioting and conducting sit-ins ... [Beer] gained the confidence of the students. He had a calming effect on students and, in this critical time, he offered a not inconsiderable service to Lehigh."

Alongside University of Connecticut professor E. Russell Johnston, Jr., Beer co-wrote three bestselling engineering textbooks: Vector Mechanics for Engineers, Mechanics of Materials, and Mechanics for Engineers: Statics and Dynamics, which won the 1976 Printing Industries of America Graphic Arts Award. He also authored numerous articles published in technical journals.

=== Awards and research ===
In 1974, the American Society for Engineering Education (ASEE) Middle Atlantic chapter awarded him the Western Electric Fund Award for engineering education. The Mechanics Division of the Science Society, in 1980, awarded him its Distinguished Educator Award. Beer's research studied the application of random loads to mechanical systems. His work in this field included support by Boeing, NASA, the Chemical Corps of the U.S. Army, the Army Corps of Engineers, and the Federal Civil Defense Administration.

Beer was a member of the American Society of Mechanical Engineers (ASME) and the American Association of University Professors (AAUP). He was also a member of the ASEE and served as its mechanics division chairman and Middle Atlantic chapter chairman.

Beer was married to Vivienne C.M. Beer who died before him. Together they had two daughters, Marguerite V. Schaeffer and Dr. Michelle C.M. Beer. He died in Bethlehem, Pennsylvania on April 30, 2003, at the age of 87. It was partly in his honor that the ASEE named the Ferdinand P. Beer and E. Russell Johnston Jr. Outstanding New Educator Awards.

== Published works ==
- F.P. Beer, E.R. Johnston Jr., J.T. DeWolf, Mechanics of Materials, New York: McGraw-Hill, 1981, ISBN 0-07-121060-1.
- F.P. Beer, E.R. Johnston Jr., et al., Vector Mechanics for Engineers, New York: McGraw-Hill, ISBN 0-07-293110-8.
- F.P. Beer, E.R. Johnston Jr., et al., Mechanics for Engineers: Statics and Dynamics, New York: McGraw-Hill, ISBN 0-07-004584-4.
