= Auguste Édouard Cerfberr =

Auguste Édouard Cerfberr (1811, Épinal—1858) was a French writer. Having completed his studies in law, Cerfberr entered the service of the government, in which he held many high positions. His last office was that of prefect and general inspector of the prisons at Grenoble. Cerfberr was the author of the following works:

- Du Gouvernement d'Alger (Paris, 1834)
- Des Sociétés de Bienfaisance Mutuelle, ou des Moyens d'Améliorer le Sort des Classes Ouvrières (Grenoble, 1836).
- Projet d'établissement d'un pénitencier d'essai à Paris (Paris, 1840)

== Bibliography ==
- La Grande Encyclopèdie, s.v.
