= Max Josef Beer =

Austrian composer (1851–1908)

Max Josef Beer (25 August 1851 – 25 November 1908 in Vienna) was an Austrian composer.

Max Josef Beer studied with Felix Otto Dessoff and at a very young age received a commission from the Austrian government for the compositions Ariadne auf Naxos, Die Auferweckung des Lazarus, and a number of songs.

On 15 February 1871, his opera seria in four acts, Elizabeth of Hungary, premiered at Milan's La Scala, starring Elisabetta Sternberg (soprano), Louis Auguste Arsandaux (tenor), Jean-Louis Lasalle (baritone) and Joseph-Victor Warot (bass).

Beer also wrote Der Streik der Schmiede, a verismo one-act opera, which unsuccessfully premiered at Augsburg, 1897.

He died in Vienna at age 57 and was buried at the Vienna Central Cemetery.

== Other compositions ==
- Fünf Minnelieder for pianoforte
- Sechs Lieder für eine Singstimme for voice with piano accompaniment
- Eichendorffiana, 9 piano pieces
- Ghazals, 6 piano pieces
- Lyrisches Intermezzo, four impressions for piano
- Sturm und Stille, 6 songs based on poems by C. Stögmann, Oskar von Redwitz, Heinrich Heine, Friedrich Rückert
- Des Sängers Fluch, after Ludwig Uhland, for declamation with piano accompaniment
- Ein Fastnachtsmärchen, 8 Carnival pieces for piano
- Aus lichten Tagen, 4 clavier-poetry
- Abendfeier, three fantasy pieces for piano, four hands
- Liebesleben, for soprano, tenor, bass and piano
- Haidebilder aus Ungarn, 3 piano pieces for four hands
- Die schöne Kellnerin von Bacharach und ihre Gäste [The beautiful waitress from Bacharach and their guests], five poems by N. Müller for a deeper voice with piano accompaniment
- Aus der Minnezeit, Op. 31, song cycle for women's choir and piano accompaniment
- Sweet Evening comes with a softer air, Op. 25, solo and chorus for male voices, texts by A. J. Foxwell
