= Cheryl Beer =

Welsh folk singer and multi-media artist

Cheryl Beer is an author, folk singer and multi-media artist. She is included among the 100+ Menywod Cymraeg/Welsh Women who have made a significant contribution to national life.

== Career ==
Beer has been a folksinger since childhood, appearing as a solo singer or as part of group from the 1990s onwards. Her albums include Just Another Judas (1997), Little Fish: Bare Bone Songs (2001), Easy Street (2016). She has worked with several organisations in Wales. She supports the benefits of the arts for health. In 2008 she was the song consultant to Festival of Four, a community festival across Merthyr Tydfil, Blaenau Gwent, Torfaen & Caerphilly led by the Welsh community arts organisation Head4Arts. In 2014 she was the founder of a dementia-friendly online radio programme Sound Memories Radio.

In 2017 her own hearing became impaired but this led her to develop new music and art recording and using the sounds from the sea and within trees and the analyses of their sound spectra. In 2022 she completed Cân y coed/Rainforest symphony, making use of sounds recorded from the mosses, trees and other plants of the Celtic rain forest in Wales. It was premiered at the National Botanic Garden of Wales and subsequently performed at other events such as the annual Unlimited Festival at the Southbank Centre in London in September 2022.

== Honours and awards ==
Beer has been included in the list of 100+MenywodCymreig-WelshWomen for her contribution to national life.
