= Vera Shabshai =

Russian dancer, choreographer and teacher (1905–1988)

Vera Shabshai (Russian: Вера Яковлевна Каган-Шабшай, Hebrew: ורה שבשאי; 1905 - 8 April 1988) was a Soviet dancer, teacher and choreographer, and the second wife of the graphic artist Nikolay Kupreyanov.

== Biography ==
Vera Shabshai was born in 1905, the daughter of Yakov Kagan-Shabshai, an electrical engineer, professor, and collector of Jewish paintings. In 1927, she graduated from the Lunacharsky Moscow State Technical School (later GITIS), the choreography department. After graduation, she joined the Jewish theatre Freikunst and sought to revive Jewish ballet and pantomime.

To support her endeavours, Shabshai turned to her father for financial assistance and to Mikhail Gnessin, chairman of the Jewish Music Society, for help with program distribution. Notable artists worked on the costumes and scenography of her performance, while the music was composed by Mikhail Gnessin, Alexander Crane, and Julius Engel. Shabshai's father subsidised the entire project.

Jewish ballet and pantomime in Soviet society was shortlived. In 1935, the Soviet government conducted a "Review of the Art of Dance", which subjected Shabshai's troupe to harsh criticism. Realising that she would never again stage a Jewish ballet or perform Jewish dance, Shabshai delivered a farewell speech at the last evening of Jewish ballet in Moscow on 17 April 1935.

Her final major work was the production of the ballet section of "Kоschei the Immortal" to music by Rimsky-Korsakov, which premiered on 1 August 1936, at the "Island of Dance" in Moscow. For the rest of her life, Shabshai struggled to survive by leading groups and helping amateur artistic activities. Her daughter, Natalia, took up the baton of recreating Jewish dance later in life.

She died on April 8, 1988.
