= Shabbethai Premsla =

Shabbethai Premsla was a Galician philologist and scribe of the sixteenth and seventeenth centuries who lived in Przemyśl, Poland, from which his name derives.

Premsla was the author of a commentary on Moses Kimhi's grammatical work, Sefer Mahalak, in which he defends the author against the criticism of Elijah Levita, a commentator on the same work. His annotations to the prayers, which were published in Dyhernfurth, Poland, were reprinted many times. He was a Talmudic scholar, and one of his responsa, on the writing of the Tetragrammaton, is found in the Teshubot ha-Geonim, published in Amsterdam in 1707. Four of his works, which were left in manuscript, are known, including one on the necessity of grammatical studies. Hayyim Bochner was his pupil.
