= Frédéric Cerfberr =

French Jewish diplomat (1786–1842)

Frédéric Cerfberr (27 October 1786, in Strasburg – 18 September 1842, at sea on a voyage from New York City to France) was a French diplomat and a Jew.

Being fond of travel and foreign languages, he obtained (in 1809), under Napoleon, the appointment as secretary of the imperial commissariat in the Ionian Islands. Later he successively represented France as consul at New York (1822), New Orleans, Haiti (1827-32), and again in Haiti as consul-general, distinguishing himself in all three offices. In 1826, when the French government could find no representative for Santo Domingo, on account of an outbreak there of yellow fever, Cerfberr freely offered his services. On learning the miserable state to which the inhabitants of Les Cayes were reduced in consequence of an earthquake, Cerfberr dispatched at his own expense a ship loaded with food and other needful articles.

Cerfberr fell a victim to his devotion to duty. The destructive earthquake at Haiti on 7 May 1842 killed his only daughter, and injured him so severely that he died on his voyage home.

== Bibliography ==
- Servi, Gli Israeliti di Europa, p. 259
- Jost, Isaak Markus Neuere Geschichte der Israeliten, ii. 165
- La Grande Encyclopédie, x. 50
