= Shabtai Daniel =

Israeli journalist and politician

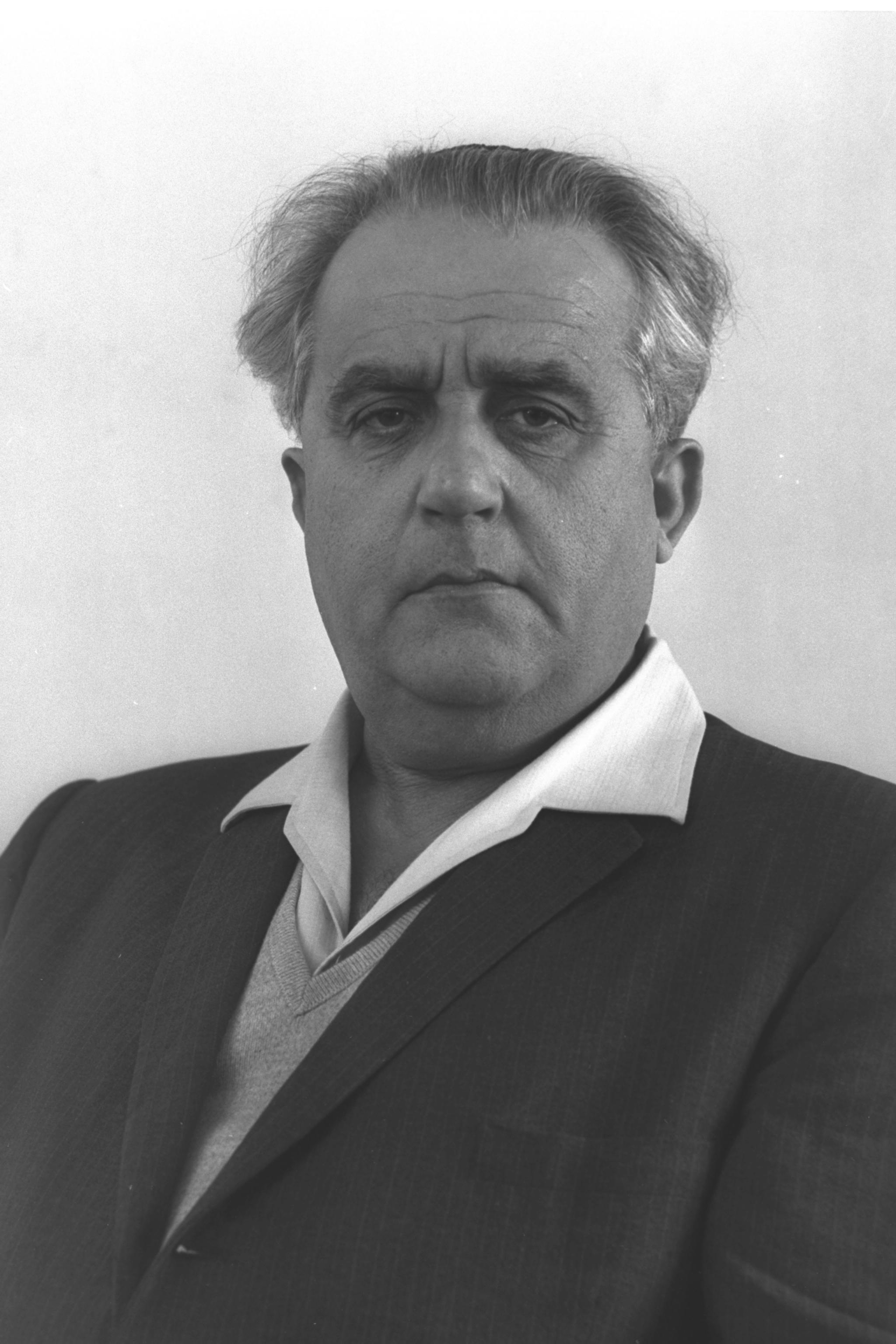
- Daniel in 1966

Faction represented in the Knesset
- 1965: National Religious Party

Personal details
- Born: 1909 Viļaka, Russian Empire
- Died: 19 December 1981 (aged 71–72)

Shabtai Daniel (Hebrew: שבתאי דניאל; 1909 – 19 December 1981) was an Israeli journalist and politician who briefly served as a member of the Knesset for the National Religious Party in 1965.

== Biography ==
Born Shabtai Don-Yichye in Viļaka in the Russian Empire (today in Latvia), Don-Yihye made aliyah to Mandatory Palestine in 1931. He studied at the Mercaz HaRav yeshiva and the Hebrew University of Jerusalem. After being certified as a teacher he worked in Kfar Yabetz and Kfar Hasidim.

A member of Hapoel HaMizrachi, he was amongst the founders of the party's HaTzofe newspaper and a member of its editorial board from its foundation. In 1948 he became its editor, remaining in post until 1981. He was on the National Religious Party list for the 1965 elections, and entered the Knesset after the party won 11 seats. However, he resigned after nine days, and was replaced by Frija Zoaretz.

He died in 1981.
