= Edwin John Beer =

British chemist and geologist (1879–1986)

Edwin John Beer (7 February 1879 – 24 September 1986) was a British chemist, geologist, mineralogist, archaeologist, historian and librarian. He is noted primarily as a pioneer of the first man-made fibre, which later became known as viscose rayon. The first stocking of artificial silk was made in his Kew laboratory.

During the First World War he prospected in India for fresh sources of industrial minerals (particularly tungsten) since the Germans had cornered essential supplies almost everywhere else. He located vast deposits of limestone suitable for making cement, which became a profitable export for India. Elected to the Geological Society of London, he later became the senior fellow. H.G. Wells and several other notables from that period were among his friends.

== Personal life and family ==
Edwin Beer was born on his grandfather's estate at Hounslow, the son of Samuel Beer, Commodore of the Clan Line, with whom the young Beer travelled more than once to India as a boy. His first voyage was at the age of 7. He was registered at St Dunstan's College, Catford, on the opening day of that establishment, and later attended St Paul's School, where G.K. Chesterton was among his seniors. He was expelled for returning late one autumn term from Calcutta.

Beer married his first wife, Margaret Finney, in 1922, who accompanied him on all his trips around the world but died of tuberculosis after ten years of marriage. In 1927, he eventually settled in Devon and in 1934, married Phoebe Hill, born in the Prestwich area. The couple had two sons, Michael (born 1935–2020) and Lionel (born 1940).

Edwin Beer died on 24 September 1986, aged 107 1/2, and was reputedly the oldest member of the National Trust. Phoebe died aged 99 on 18 September 2008.

== Viscose Rayon ==
After a short time working in a public analyst's office and for an East India merchant in the city, Beer joined C F Cross's Viscose Spinning Syndicate at Kew in 1897. He became the chief works chemist, housed in a mews near Kew Gardens railway station, and played a key role in the conversion of viscose from a chemical curiosity to a valuable commercial material. The team had discovered viscose but was unable to discover how it might be spun. Beer solved that puzzle with acid fixing treatment to secure the requisite strength, softness and lustre. The silken substance could then be used to create thread suitable for numerous applications in the clothing trade, though further development was needed to make the process reliable. In addition, pyroxyline was introduced from which collodion could be produced in thin sheets, which, when shaped and carbonised, would be used in electric lamps, textile fabrics and even insulating thread.

The first artificial silk stocking was produced in his laboratory there. He exhibited the material in the Paris Exhibition of 1900, where the German Empress ordered a gown made from the new material. In addition, he made viscose filaments for electric lamps designed by Edison and Swan. Sir Joseph Swan said the substance looked like artificial silk, and it was he who suggested we should manufacture it.

Courtaulds eventually bought the patent rights on 22 August 1904 from The Syndicate, and Beer found himself redundant without any compensation. At the time, Courtaulds did not appreciate Beer's painstaking efforts in experimenting with Viscose over seven years and almost failed to consolidate their acquisition.

As it was a new industry, no textbooks existed to guide them, but the situation was saved when someone found in a cupboard all the exact and detailed records of Beer's experiments.

Later, Edwin Beer became disgruntled by what he perceived as all the "incorrect histories" of the man-made fibre industries, and in 1962, he and his wife Phoebe published "The Beginning of Rayon". This book evokes a world where the practice of science was not yet a respectable profession. Beer had to work for long, irregular hours, at even more irregular pay, in a laboratory, formerly a stable, slimy with caustic soda, and reeking of carbon disulfide.

His Viscose Rayon samples were donated to the Science Museum, Kensington, in 1997.

== Geology ==
By 1899, aged 20, Edwin Beer was already an established geologist as well as an industrial chemist. In 1908, he took a post in Bombay analysing manganese ores and assaying gold. For a while, he was unemployed. "Nothing", he said, "was supposed to be more demeaning in the days of the British Raj than for a white man to be employed in India". The following year, on the way to a new job as a prospector in India, he was suspected of being a French spy and arrested.

During the First World War, and harassed by further arrests, he continued prospecting in India for fresh sources of industrial minerals (particularly tungsten) vital for Britain's war effort since the Germans had cornered essential supplies almost everywhere else. He also filled in the last blank space of the geological map of India, for which he was awarded the Silver Medal of the Mining & Geological Institute of India in 1918.

Beer located 13 vast deposits of limestone suitable for making cement, which became a profitable export for India. In 1924, he visited Tasmania, New Zealand and the Cook Islands.

In 1926, after spending some months with a mineral dealer in California, he returned to Devon for a "look around", and settled there, marrying Phoebe Hill in 1934. He took an interest in the Torquay Natural History Society, taking over the Geological section in 1928. Edwin Beer was elected President of the TNHS for two years in 1949, and in 1965, became Senior Fellow of the Royal Geological Society of London.

A reminder of the extraordinary span of Beer's geological career is the story of the specimen from a Devonshire cave that he sent to London for identification, and which evoked a response more than 70 years later that he had indeed identified it correctly as palygorskite.

Beer's considerable collection of rocks and minerals went to the Geology Department of the University of Leicester.
