= Judha Nugraha =

Indonesian diplomat (born 1974)

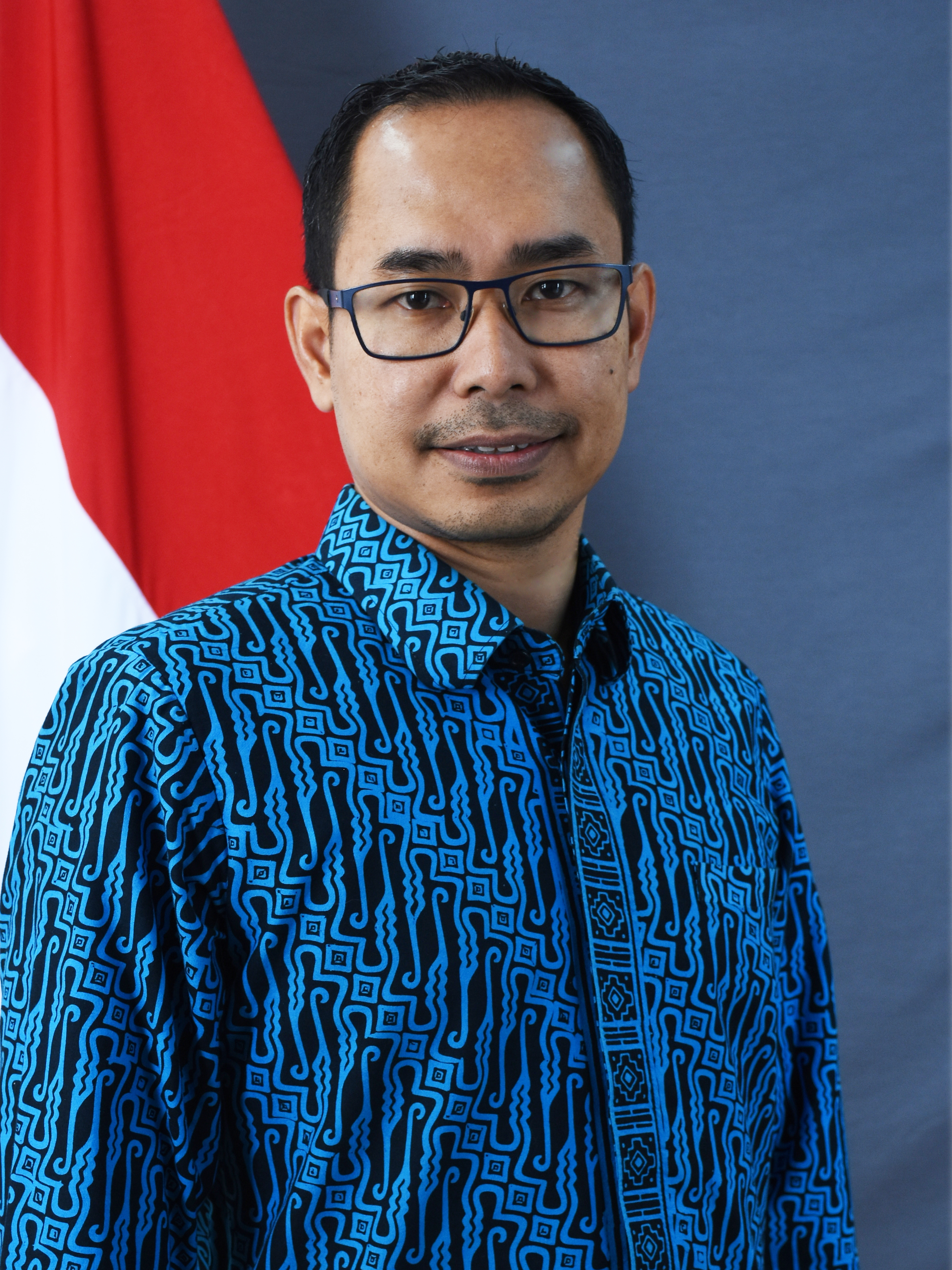

Ambassador of Indonesia to the United Arab Emirates
- Incumbent
- Assumed office 25 August 2025
- President: Prabowo Subianto
- Preceded by: Husin Bagis

Personal details
- Born: 9 November 1974 (age 52)
- Spouse: Dwi Kerti Catur Wulan Yuaningrum
- Education: Gadjah Mada University (S.E.); Monash University (MDAT)

Judha Nugraha (born 9 November 1974) is an Indonesian diplomat who is currently serving as ambassador to the United Arab Emirates since 2025. He previously served as the director of the Indonesian citizen protection in the foreign ministry from 2019 to 2025.

== Early life and education ==
Born on 9 November 1974, Judha completed high school at the 8th Yogyakarta state high school. He began studying economics at the Gadjah Mada University in 1993. Judha received master's degree in diplomacy and trade from the Monash University in 2003.

== Diplomatic career ==
Judha joined the foreign ministry in December 2000. He was posted to various diplomatic representatives abroad throughout his tenure in the foreign ministry. He served for three and a half years at the economic section of Indonesia's permanent representative to the United Nations in Geneva, rising from third secretary to the rank of second secretary. He handled issues relating to the General Council, Committee on Agriculture, G33, G20, Cairns Group, and was involved in Indonesia's deputy chairmanship of the World Trade Organization Ministerial Conference of 2009. After serving in Geneva, Judha was posted to the Kuala Lumpur's embassy's consular section with the rank of first secretary, during which he was responsible in protecting Indonesia citizens in the country.

== Director of Indonesian Citizen Protection ==
In 2017, Judha was named as the deputy director (chief of subdirectorate) for institutional affairs and protection diplomacy within the foreign ministry's directorate of Indonesian citizen protection. During his tenure, he was involve in the repatriation of an Indonesian migrant workers murdered in Malaysia, Indonesian crew members who were stranded in India and the Netherlands, and freeing Indonesian migrant workers in Saudi Arabia from a death sentence. He became the acting director for Indonesian citizen protection in 2019 for a few months before being permanently appointed to the position in September 2019. According to him, at the start of his tenure he felt that his predecessor Lalu Muhamad Iqbal had "left very big shoes" for him to fill. Iqbal later consoled him, stating that he "has his own path" and assured him the support of his staffs.

During his tenure, Judha oversaw the implementation of the Peduli WNI portal in embassies, which was intended as a unified digital platform for Indonesian citizen services and protection and integrated with the Ministry of Home Affairs’ population system. Under Judha, the directorate implemented the three-step approach of prevention, early detection, and immediate response to handle Indonesian citizen protection issues. He was also directly involved in evacuating Indonesian citizens from Wuhan during the early phase of the COVID-19 pandemic in 2020 and repatriating Indonesian citizens from warzones in Ukraine during the Russo-Ukrainian War, Sudan following the Sudanese civil war, Iran during the Twelve-Day War, and Gaza following the Israeli–Palestinian conflict. During the latter, Judha worked closely with American lobbyist Joey Allaham, who used his backchannel to ensure the safety of Indonesia. He also led the repatriation of 400 Indonesian victims of human trafficking from Myawaddy, Myanmar, where he personally traveled to the Thailand–Myanmar border to oversee the rescue and ensure their safety. For his work in ensuring the safety of Indonesian citizens, Judha was nicknamed as the "guardian angel" of Indonesian citizens. He served as director until his replacement by Heni Hamidah, the secretary of the directorate general for protocol and consular affairs, in an acting capacity on 20 October 2025. In total, Judha served as deputy director and director for eight years, six months, and twenty days.

== Ambassador to the United Arab Emirates ==
In August 2024, Judha was nominated by President Joko Widodo as ambassador to Malaysia. Judha never underwent assessment by the House of Representatives for his nomination, and he was re-nominated for ambassador to the United Arab Emirates by President Prabowo Subianto in July. He underwent a closed assessment by the House of Representative's first commission on 5 July, during which he was questioned regarding Indonesia–United Arab Emirates relations. His nomination was approved by the House of Representatives committee in a session three days later, and he was installed on 25 August 2025. He departed for the United Arab Emirates on 31 October 2025 and arrived the next day, with him receiving duties as ambassador from chargé d'affaires ad interim Muhammad Sadri on 3 November 2025. He conferred copies of his letters of credence to the Undersecretary of the Ministry of Foreign Affairs Omar Obaid Alhesan Alshamsi on 4 November 2025 and presented his credentials to the President of the United Arab Emirates Mohamed bin Zayed Al Nahyan on 1 December 2025.

During the 2026 Iran war, which saw several Iran missile strikes targeted to cities in the United Arab Emirates, Judha led efforts by the embassy to repatriate Indonesian citizens stuck at airports in the country. Through coordination with the airlines and civil aviation authorities, the embassy managed to send off 30 stranded Indonesians to Singapore, who will then continue their journey to Indonesia through another travel route. He also paid a visit to stranded Indonesian citizens who were accommodated by the Indonesian diaspora in the country.

== Personal life ==
Judha is married to Dwi Kerti Catur Wulan Yuaningrum and has two children.
