= Benny Shabtai =

Israeli businessman

- בני שבתאי
- Born: 1949 (age 76–77); Tel Aviv
- Occupation: businessman
- Known for: founder of the Raymond Weil watchmaker’s U.S. brand in 1977
- Spouse(s): Lori Weitz (divorced); Stacey Cooper

Benny Shabtai (Hebrew: בני שבתאי) is an Israeli-American multimillionaire businessman and investor, founder of the U.S. Raymond Weil watch brand (1977-2009) and former major shareholder in Viber, the Israeli instant-messaging, voice and video calling app.

Shabtai served on the Friends of the Israel Defense Forces (FIDF) board of directors for decades and was instrumental in transforming their gatherings into large fundraising galas. Shabtai and Jeffrey Epstein toured Israeli military bases in 2008, while Epstein was under criminal indictment. Shabtai is the primary financial supporter and namesake of the Shabtai Society at Yale University devoted garnering support for Israel and preparing Jewish leaders.

== Early life ==
Benny Shabtai was born in Tel Aviv and raised on a kibbutz. He has two siblings. He served for three years in the Israeli army and served in the Golan Heights during the 1967 Six-Day War. Shabtai worked as a bodyguard for the Israeli ambassador in Paris, where his father was stationed as an envoy. After two years in Paris, he traveled to South Africa, where he worked as a croupier at a casino in Swaziland. He returned to Israel to rejoin the army, serving during the 1973 Yom Kippur War.

== Business career ==
After completing his reserve duty, Shabtai relocated to the U.S. He began working at the now defunct Eastman Watch Company, an importer of inexpensive watches from Hong Kong. At the industry's International Watch and Jewellery Fair in Basel he met Raymond Weil, the eponymous head of the Swiss luxury watchmaker and he agreed to sell him four hundred Raymond Weil watches, which he then sold to two clients in the U.S. As owner and president of Raymond Weil USA (established in 1977), Shabtai was the exclusive distributor in the U.S. until 2009 when he sold the company. In 2000 he founded the New York-based Jewelry company DiModolo.

In February 2014, the $900 million sale of Viber, an Israeli instant messaging, voice and video calling app, to Japanese company Rakuten earned the Shabtai family (Benny, his brother Gilad, and Gilad's son Ofer) some $500 million from their 55.2% stake. The family Shabtai has profited as investors from positions in Israeli arms industry.

== Activism ==
Shabtai was nearly two decades a board member of Friends of the Israel Defense Forces (FIDF), a 501(c)(3) organization authorized to collect donations in the USA on behalf of Israel Defense Forces (IDF) soldiers. From 1996 to 2012, he chaired the FIDF National New York Gala Dinner at the Waldorf Astoria New York, at which, in 2011, $23 million were raised., while $26 million were raised the following year.

Shabtai calls his involvement with FIDF in "educating" the American people on "the sacrifices of young Israeli soldiers and the dangers they experience" as his "greatest success," adding, "It's the best thing I've done in my life. The issue is very close to me."

In April 2008, FIDF chairman Shabtai flew together with Jeffrey Epstein to Israel, "engaging in clandestine discussions with the Israeli military officials, purportedly to fund undisclosed operations", while Epstein was facing charges of sex trafficking minors and pleaded guilty.

In 2014, the Shabtai Jewish leadership society based at Yale University established through Benny Shabtai's donation, purchased a New Haven, Connecticut mansion for $1.5 million, according to city records, as its new residence.

== Personal life ==
Shabtai is divorced from Lori Weitz with whom they had three children. In 2015, Shabtai married Stacey Cooper.
