= Writing to Persuade =

2019 non-fiction book by Trish Hall

Writing to Persuade: How to Bring People Over to Your Side
- First edition
- Author: Trish Hall
- Publisher: Liveright
- Publication date: June 2019
- Pages: 224
- ISBN: 978-1-63149-787-2

Writing to Persuade: How to Bring People Over to Your Side is a 2019 non-fiction book by Trish Hall, a longtime journalist and former op-ed editor at The New York Times.

== Overview ==
The book is "part memoir, part self-help, and part writing guide" according to Kirkus Reviews. Subjects covered in the book include: "why lies on Twitter are more popular than facts," "why Republicans are better persuaders than Democrats," "how things work at Op-Ed," as well as "inside baseball" at The New York Times about "memorable essays" by Angelina Jolie, Vladimir Putin, and others.

== Reception ==
Writing to Persuade received positive reviews. Kirkus Reviews said it is "a lucid book about building bridges through communication along with some interesting behind-the-scenes background at the NYT." Publishers Weekly wrote, "This book offers sound, well-reasoned advice that will benefit any writer." In a review in The New York Times Book Review, Patricia T. O'Conner stated, Hall "convincingly demonstrates that beliefs always outweigh facts."
