= Anatole Cerfberr =

French journalist and author (1835–1896)

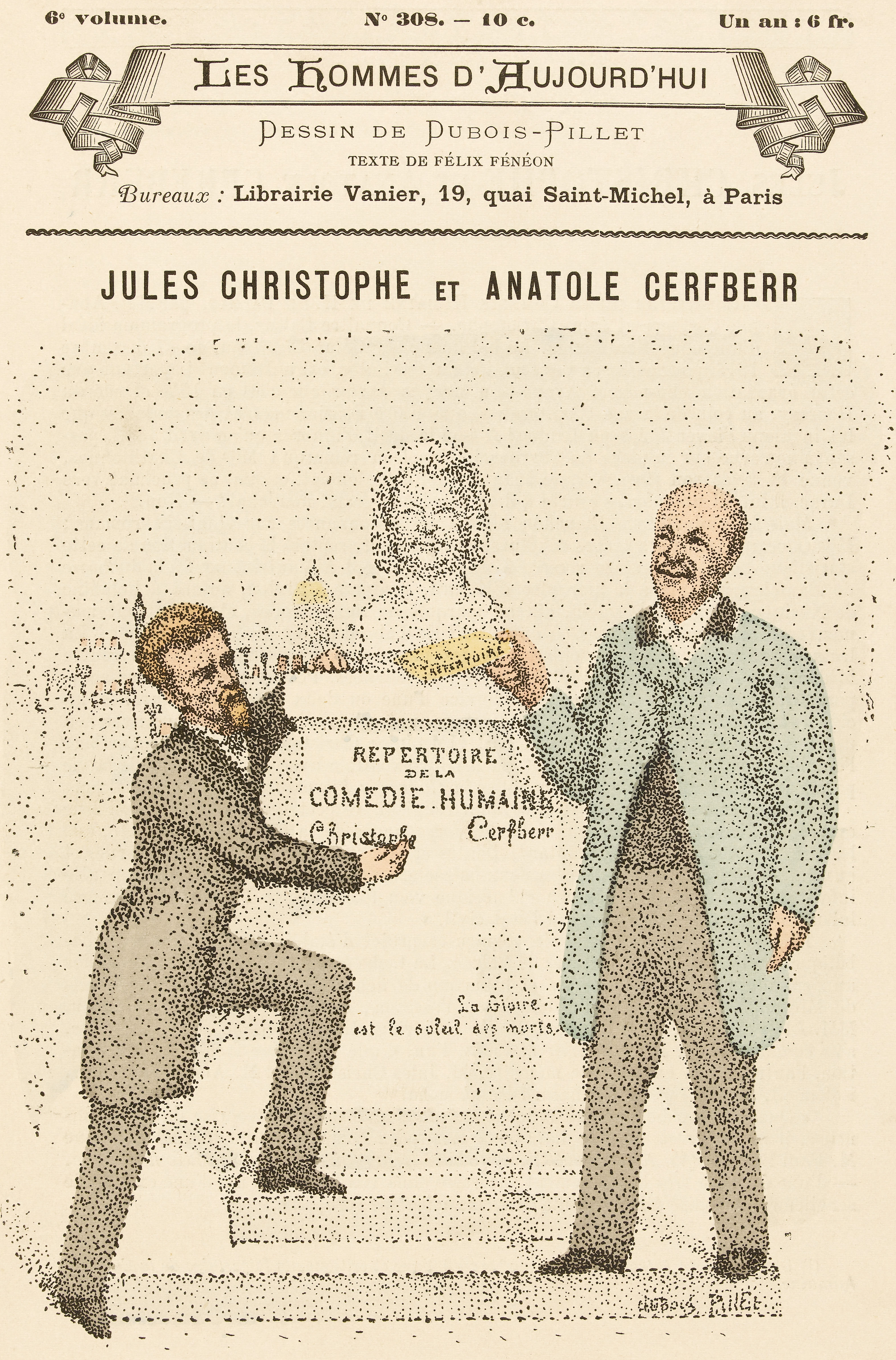
Jules Christophe et Anatole Cerfberr présentent un exemplaire de leur Répertoire de La comédie humaine à un buste de Balzac (Les hommes d'aujourd'hui, vol. 6, n° 308)

Anatole Cerfberr (1835, Paris – 1896, Neuilly) was a French journalist and author. Under various pseudonyms, among which were "Arthur Clary," "Antoine Cerlier," and "Fulgence Ridal," he contributed to numerous papers. He was an admirer of Honoré de Balzac and Victor Hugo, an ardent socialist, and well versed in matters concerning the stage. Cerfberr published many poems, biographies, studies, etc. Together with Jules François Christophe, he also published a work entitled Répertoire de la Comédie Humaine de H. de Balzac, which was crowned by the Académie française (Paris, 1887). The purpose of the Répertoire is to give in alphabetical sequence the names of all the characters of Balzac's Comédie Humaine, together with the salient points in their lives. Balzac made his characters appear again and again, thus creating out of his distinct novels a miniature world. The work of Cerfberr and Christophe is a guide to that world.
