= Edwin Beer =

American surgeon

Edwin Beer (1876–1938) was an American surgeon who pioneered the endoscopic treatment of papillary bladder tumors. He is recognized as the founder of electrosurgery of the bladder.

== Early life ==
Beer was born and raised in New York City. His parents were Julian and Sophia Beer, wealthy German Jews. He had a comfortable childhood. Beer attended the Columbia Grammar School and Dr. Sachs Collegiate Institute. He graduated from Columbia College in 1896, receiving his medical degree three years later from the College of Physicians and Surgeons of New York.

== Career ==
=== Early career ===
In 1899, Beer started his practical medical career as an intern at the Mount Sinai Hospital in New York City. He completed his internship in 1902.

=== Milestone work ===
In 1908 Beer conceived the idea of using high frequency electric current through a catheterizing cystoscope to electrocoagulate bladder tumors. Beer was convinced that Maximilian Nitze's earlier transurethral treatment of bladder tumors was superior to open surgery. He asked Reinhold Wappler (American inventor of the electrical apparatus used for spark-gap electrocautery) whether his technique might be used for urology.

Beer used a two-channel Nitze cystoscope and a monopolar current derived from a resonator made by Wappler. In 1910, in an endoscopy aimed to remove bladder tumors, Beer introduced electrosurgery, which consists in the use of radiofrequency alternating current to cut and coagulate tissues. His method proved to be successful and revolutionary. For the next 25 years, Beer studied extensively bladder neoplasms and continued to develop and improve his method of treatment.

== Recognition ==
In 1927, Beer was awarded the first gold medal given by the International Society of Urology for his work with electro-fulguration. Ten years later he was awarded the Gold Key by the American Congress of Physical Therapy for his pioneering contributions to the treatment of vesical tumors. After Beer died in 1938 Reed Nesbit wrote regarding Beer's method of electrosurgery:

Development of this technique by its brilliant discoverer marked one of the greatest advances in the history of urology; it led not only to radical change in the therapeutic management of bladder tumors, but also paved the way for subsequent electro- resection methods by proving that high-frequency current could be employed effectively under water.

== Legacy ==
Beer's legacy continues today in the Edwin Beer Program of the New York Academy of Medicine in support to research in urology.
