= Randall Beer =

American roboticist

Randall D. Beer is a professor of cognitive science, computer science, and informatics at Indiana University. He was previously at Case Western Reserve University. His primary research interest is in understanding how coordinated behavior arises from the neurodynamics of an animal's nervous system, its body and its environment. He works on the evolution and analysis of dynamical "nervous systems" for model agents, neuromechanical modeling of animals, biomorphic robotics, and dynamical systems approaches to behavior and cognition. More generally, he is interested in computational and theoretical biology, including models of metabolism, gene regulation and development. He also has a longstanding interest in the design and implementation of dynamic programming languages and their environments.

== Books ==
- Biological neural networks in invertebrate neuroethology and robotics / edited by Randall D. Beer, Roy E. Ritzmann, Thomas McKenna. Boston : Academic Press, c1993. xi, 417 p. : ill.; 24 cm. ISBN 0-12-084728-0 (acid-free paper)
- Beer, Randall D. Intelligence as adaptive behavior : an experiment in computational neuroethology / Randall D. Beer. Boston : Academic Press, c1990. xxiii, 213 p. : ill.; 24 cm. ISBN 0-12-084730-2 (alk. paper)
