= Max-Théodore Cerfberr =

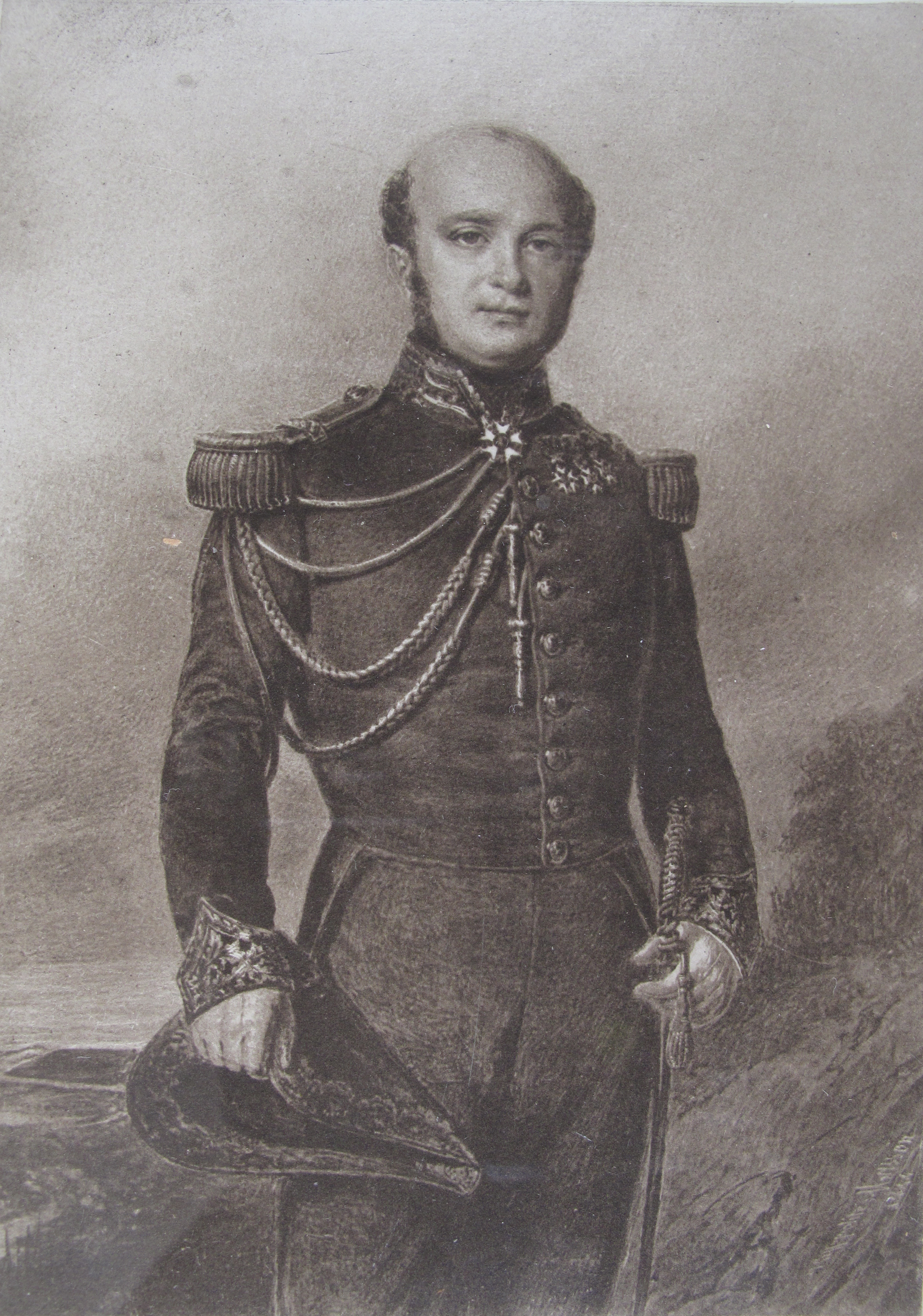
Max-Théodore Cerfberr

Max-Théodore Cerfberr (9 December 1792, Nancy, Meurthe—15 January 1876) was a French military officer and parliamentary deputy. He was also president of the Consistoire Central Israelite de France.

He entered the army at an early age, and was made an officer by Napoleon I without having passed through the military school. In 1827 he was made captain on the general staff, and in 1834 commander of a squadron, and was attached to the War Department as staff secretary. When General Schneider became minister of war in 1839, he placed Cerfberr at the head of his bureau.

Cerfberr, promoted to the rank of lieutenant-colonel, took his seat in the Chamber of Deputies 9 July 1842, as representative from Wissembourg, having received 86 out of a total of 161 votes against 71 cast for Renouard de Bussières, the incumbent deputy. He supported the government, devoting himself chiefly to military questions; thus he succeeded in having the fund for the relief of old soldiers increased by 150,000 francs. Cerfberr, now a colonel, was reelected to the Chamber of Deputies 1 August 1846, having received 119 out of a total of 218 votes against 95 cast for Renouard de Bussières. He cast his vote for the ministry of Guizot. He retired from office after the revolution of February, 1848.

In addition to his political duties, Cerfberr had also acted as manager of the Théâtre du Gymnase at Paris. He was a commander of the Légion d'honneur.
