= Sabsovich =

Sabsovich, Sapsovich may refer to:

- Leonid Sabsovich (Russian: Леонид Моисеевич Сабсович), a Jewish Soviet urban planner and economist
- Marna Sapsowitz, American female rabbi
- Hirsch Loeb Sabsovich (1860-1921), Jewish American agronomist, chemist, mayor of Woodbine, New Jersey
