= Cerf (surname) =

Cerf or Le Cerf is a French-language surname, derived from cerf, meaning "hind", "hart" or "deer". It is common for both Christians and Jews, an equivalent of Naphtali, to which the meaning of "hind" is attributed, and is thus also the equivalent of the same name translated into other European languages, for example Hirsch in German and Jellinek in Czech.

Notable people with this surname include the following:

- Bennett Cerf (1898–1971), publisher and co-founder of Random House
  - Jonathan Cerf, his son, author of Big Bird's Red Book and the 1980 world champion of Othello, the board game
- Camille Cerf (journalist) (a man, 1862 – 1936), Belgian journalist and camera operator who worked for the Lumière brothers as of 1895
- Camille Cerf (a woman, born 1994), recipient of the Miss France 2015 award
- Cécile Cerf (1916–1973), French resistance fighter
- Christopher Cerf (musician and television producer) (born 1941), American author, composer-lyricist, and record and television producer
- Christopher Cerf (school politician and businessman) (born 1960), New Jersey educator
- Ferdinand Le Cerf (1881–1945), French entomologist
- Gustav Zerffi, born Cerf or Hirsch (1820–1892), Hungarian Jewish journalist, revolutionary and spy
- Jean Cerf (born 1928), French mathematician who worked in differential topology and symplectic geometry, pioneer of Cerf theory
- Jean-Laurent Le Cerf de La Viéville (1674–1707), musicographer
- Karl Friedrich Cerf (1782–1845), German theatrical manager
- Muriel Cerf (1950–2012), French novelist and travel writer
- Nicolas J. Cerf (born 1965), a Belgian theoretical physicist working on quantum information theory
- Phyllis Cerf (1916–2006), American actress, journalist, and children's book publisher, and the co-founder of Beginner Books
- Vint Cerf (born 1943), American computer scientist, often referred to as one of the founding fathers of the Internet

== See also ==
- Cerfbeer
