= Volodymyr Shabashevych =

- Born: October 23, 1946 (age 79); Chernivtsi, Ukraine (formerly: USSR)
- Occupation: Composer
- Instrument: Piano

Volodymyr Romanovych Shabashevych (Ukrainian: Володимир Романович Шабашевич; born 1946 in Chernivtsi) is a Ukrainian Canadian pianist, composer and conductor.

== Biography ==
Shabashevych was born in 1946 into a Jewish-heritage family in Chernivtsi, a small city in south-western Ukraine. He learned to play accordion during his middle and high school years and moved to Kostroma, Russia after graduation. There, he studied music at a pedagogical institute. After his mandatory service in the Soviet Army he returned to his hometown and became the head of the local boys' choir and started teaching conducting at the Music Department of the Chernivtsi Pedagogical Institute. Since 1977 and until his emigration to Toronto, Canada in 1991, Shabashevych also headed the Ukrainian folk music band Marichka.

In 2018, his name was added to the Walk of Fame in his hometown, Chernivtsi.

Songs composed by Shabashevych have been performed by Alla Kudlai, Lilia Sandulesu, Jamala, and other well-known Ukrainian artists.
