= Marx Bashew =

South African entrepreneur (1876–1949)

- Born: Mordecai Shabashewitz; May 15, 1876; Raseiniai, Lithuania
- Died: January 17, 1949; Cape Town, South Africa
- Occupation: entrepreneur
- Known for: Bashew's soft drinks
- Spouse: Ethel Klein

Marx Bashew (born Mordecai Shabashewitz; 15 May 1876 – 17 January 1949) was a Lithuania-born South African entrepreneur and public benefactor primarily known for the soft drink brand Bashew's which he co-founded with his brother Harry in 1899.

== Biography ==
Mordecai Shabashewitz was born into the Lithuanian Jewish family of Zemach and Rachel Shabashewitz in Raseiniai, then part of Kovno Governorate in the Russian Empire. Like many young Lithuanian Jews in the late 19th century, he immigrated to the British Cape Colony in Southern Africa, then a popular destination because of its rapidly growing economy based on trade and diamond mining. There, he changed his Yiddish-origin name to Marx Bashew to make it easier to pronounce for the local population.

In 1903, Bashew married Ethel Klein at a Cape Town synagogue. As is known from the sponsor lists published in the newspaper Ha-Melitz, both Marx Bashew and his wife supported Zionist immigration to the Land of Israel by donations.

Marx Bashew died in 1949 and is buried in Pinelands 1 Jewish cemetery in Cape Town.

== Bashew's ==
In 1899, when the Second Boer War brought thousands of British soldiers to Cape Town, Marx and his brother Harry launched a small soft drink manufacturing plant to meet the increased demand from the servicemen, many of whom had no prior exposure to the hot and dry climate of the Western Cape. This company born during the war was named Bashew Bros. Pty. Ltd. and co-headed by Marx and Harry Bashew until Harry's death in 1947. After 124 years, soft drinks under the brand Bashew's are still manufactured in South Africa and have been called a part of the nation's cultural heritage.
