= Aaron Beer =

German Jewish cantor and composer

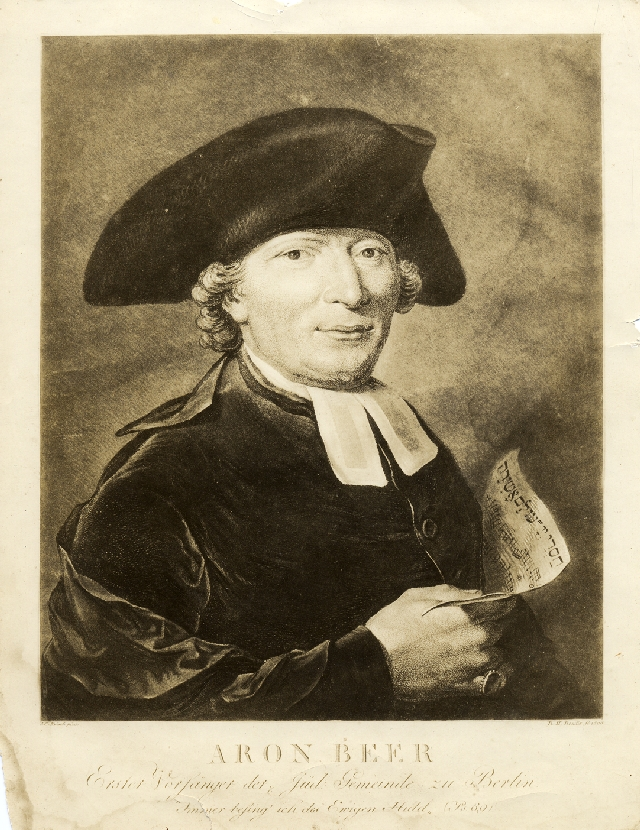

Personal life
- Born: 10 February 1739 Poppenlauer, Bavaria, Holy Roman Empire
- Died: 3 January 1821 (aged 82) Berlin, Prussia, German Confederation
- Children: Meno Burg (stepson)

Religious life
- Religion: Judaism

Aaron Beer Gabriel (Yiddish: אהרן בער גבריאל); (10 February 1739 – 3 January 1821), also known as the Bamberger Ḥazzan, was a German ḥazzan and composer, who served as chief cantor of the Jewish congregation of Berlin. He was known as a tenor of considerable vocal range.

== Biography ==
Aaron Beer was born in Poppenlauer, Bavaria, in 1739. He became cantor in Paderborn at a young age, and in 1765 he came to Berlin. He succeeded Hartog Leo as chief cantor of the Heidereutergasse Synagogue in 1786.

Beer composed himself, but also commissioned compositions, collecting over 1,200 pieces of music for use in the synagogue. He actively sought to discourage the congregation from singing along by constantly adding new melodies. His collection is now held at the Hebrew Union College in Cincinnati, United States.
