= Shabtai Ambron =

Italian Jewish philosopher and astronomer

Shabtai Ambron (Hebrew: שבתי עמברון; fl. early 18th century) was an Italian Jewish philosopher and astronomer.

He lived in Rome in the first half of the eighteenth century. Ambron's life-work was a book on the universe, entitled Pancosmosophia, in which he made a systematic attempt to refute the astronomical views of Ptolemy, Copernicus, and Tycho Brahe, and to set up a cosmogony, the underlying principle of which was that the earth was flat. He attempted to support his views by an appeal to Jewish tradition and Kabbalah. The author had already prepared some hundred copperplates to illustrate his theories, when the Roman Inquisition prohibited the printing of the work. Ambron sent his manuscripts to Venice, but here also his efforts were frustrated by the papal nuncio, Mattei. On learning that German scholars were interested in his work, he sent it with the plates to the publisher of the Neuer Bücher-Saalder Gelehrten-Welt in Leipzig, but it does not appear to have been printed.

Ambron also devoted considerable work to a projected Bibliotheca Rabbinica, with the intention of correcting Bartolocci's errors and misconceptions. This manuscript shared the fate of the foregoing.

In 1721 he was a member of the Congrega, the representative body of the Jewish community in Rome.
