= Moses Shabbethai Beer =

Personal life
- Born: Pesaro, Papal States
- Died: 6 May 1835 Rome, Papal States

Religious life
- Religion: Judaism

Jewish leader
- Successor: Israel Moses Hazan
- Position: Chief Rabbi of Rome
- Began: 1825
- Ended: 1835

Moses Shabbethai Beer (Hebrew: שבתי משה באר, Italian: Moisè Sabbato Beer; died May 6, 1835) was an Italian rabbi. He was born in Pesaro, and he officiated as rabbi in Rome from December 1825. He was admitted to interviews with Popes Leo XII and Gregory XVI in 1827 and 1831, respectively, in order that he might plead on behalf of his community. This was the first time in the history of the Roman Jews that one of their representatives was permitted to appear in person before the pontiff.

== Publications ==
- Gadol verav veram Napoleon (in Hebrew, Italian, and Latin). Tipographia della Società letteraria. 1809.
- Beer, Moisè Sabbato (1837). Raccolta di no. 26 prediche, orazioni funebri e discorsi panegirici (in Italian).
