= Maximilien Charles Alphonse Cerfberr of Medelsheim =

French journalist (1817–1883)

Maximilien Charles Alphonse Cerfberr of Medelsheim (20 July 1817, Epinal – 16 December 1883, Paris) was a French journalist, writer and governmental official.

After traveling extensively in Algeria and the East, Cerfberr was attached in 1839 to the penitentiary administration in the Ministry of the Interior. In 1848 he held for a short time the position of commissary of the Republic in the Department of Saône-et-Loire.

Among Cerfberr's numerous writings the most noteworthy are:

- Projet d'un Etablissement Pénitencier à Paris, 1841
- La Vérité sur les Prisons, 1844
- Le Silence en Prison, Réflexions d'un Condamné, 1847
- Ce Que Sont les Juifs en France, 1843
- Les Juifs, Leurs Histoire, Leurs Mœurs, 1846
- La Guyane, Civilisation et Barbarie, Coutumes et Usages, 1854
- Paraboles, 1854
- La Police d'Assurance, 1867
- L'Epargne par la Dépense, 1867
- Biographie Alsacienne, 1878
- Histoire d'un Village, 1881
- L'Architecture en France, 1883

Cerfberr wrote on several other subjects of less importance; and he translated several works from German into French.

== Bibliography ==
- Larousse Dictionnaire xvii. (2d Supplement), p. 761
- La Grande Encyclopédie, x. 50
