= Morton Klein =

American economist (born 1947)

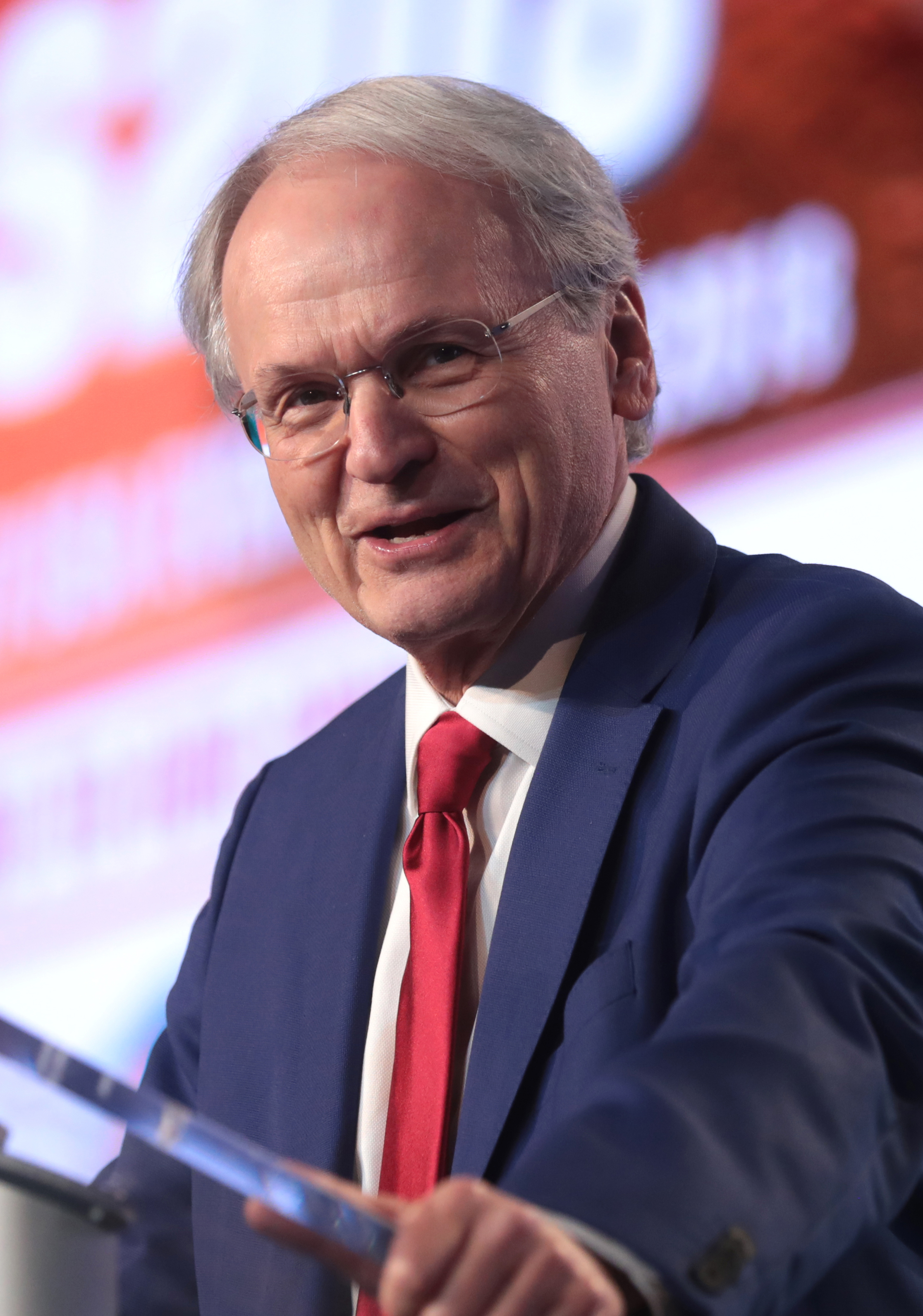
- Klein in 2018
- Born: Morton A. Klein; 1947 (age 78–79); Günzburg, Germany
- Occupation: President of the Zionist Organization of America

Morton A. "Mort" Klein (born 1947) is a German-born American economist, statistician, and pro-Israel activist. He is the president of the Zionist Organization of America. In 2004, The Forward named him as one of the fifty most influential Jewish leaders in the United States.

Klein is a published academic, having served as a lecturer at Temple University and as a biostatistician at the UCLA Fielding School of Public Health and the Linus Pauling Institute.

== Early life and career ==
Klein was born to Holocaust survivors in a displaced persons camp in Günzburg, Germany. At age four, he and his family emigrated from Germany to the United States, where he would grow up in South Philadelphia.

His father was a Satmar Hasid, an ultra-Orthodox Rabbi with semicha from Moshe Teitelbaum. Klein said in a Jewish Press interview regarding his father that, "In Europe, he had a long beard and black hat, and was a rosh yeshiva in his early 20s. But he disagreed with the Satmars on Israel. My father loved Israel; so, obviously this was transmitted to me."

Klein served as an economist under presidents Richard Nixon, Gerald Ford, and Jimmy Carter. He has served as a biostatistician at UCLA School of Public Health and the Linus Pauling Institute of Science and Medicine in Palo Alto, California. He has been a lecturer in mathematics and statistics at Temple University. Today, Klein is a member of the International Board of Governors of the Ariel University Center of Samaria.

He was dismayed by the 1993 signing of the Oslo Accords, choosing to begin pro-Israel work in response: "I only went into the work because I thought Oslo was a disastrous mistake, and I wanted a podium to express that. I did not intend to do it for more than a year or two, make my case, and then go back to normal life. But things kept getting worse, not better."

== Zionist Organization of America ==
In 1993, while serving as the Philadelphia chapter president of the Zionist Organization of America, Klein was elected national president. He is credited for converting it from a moribund group to a high-profile, outspoken organization. After the Obama administration abstained from using its veto power to block United Nations Security Council Resolution 2334 which stated that Israeli Settlement in the West Bank is a "flagrant" violation of international law, Klein called Obama "a Jew-hating antisemite."

Through the ZOA, Klein criticized Democratic congresswoman Alexandria Ocasio Cortez for using the phrase never again in reference to the Trump administration's immigration detention facilities. Klein has also called for Rashida Tlaib to be removed from Democratic Party for what he views as antisemitic comments.

In November 2022, after Donald Trump had dinner with Kanye West and Nick Fuentes, Klein said "I have become very frightened for my people ... Donald Trump is not an antisemite. He loves Israel. He loves Jews. But he mainstreams, he legitimizes Jew hatred and Jew haters. And this scares me."

== Controversies ==
=== Statements on Profiling of Muslims ===
Klein has stated his belief that the U.S. should engage in religious profiling of Muslims. "In an era in which the vast majority of terrorism is committed by Muslims, in order to protect American citizens, we should adopt the same profiling policies as Israel and be more thorough in vetting Muslims," he told The Forward. Klein said he would also support profiling of Jews under certain circumstances. "If most terror were committed by Jews I would support profiling Jews." In 2012, he voiced opposition to Palestinian statehood, saying "Statehood will only promote the Palestinians’ terrorist agenda. Statehood is not the answer." He also said that the existence of Israeli settlements on occupied land is a "fake issue".

=== Natalie Portman, "beautiful" but not "too bright" ===
In April 2018, Klein tweeted: "Natalie Portman's absurd, uninformed, inaccurate, dangerous views on Israel, while ignoring the anti-Semitic, pro-terrorist views/actions of Hamas and the Palestinian Authority gives credibility and legitimacy to the ludicrous, false, nonsensical belief that beautiful women aren't too bright." Portman had refused to accept the Genesis Prize in Israel, protesting the killing of Palestinian demonstrators on the Gaza Strip border. Klein was accused of misogyny. He first dismissed the criticism by citing an "attractive and smart" female staffer, but later apologised for his comments.

=== Use of anti-Arab slur ===
Klein was the target of condemnation in September 2018 for using the term "filthy Arabs" on Twitter. He has stood by his comment.

=== Opposition to Black Lives Matter ===
Klein made a series of tweets in June 2020 condemning Black Lives Matter as "a Jew hating, White hating, Israel hating, conservative Black hating, violence promoting, dangerous Soros funded extremist group of haters." In the context of the widespread protests following the police murder of George Floyd, the statements put Klein in conflict with more liberal Jewish groups. Rabbi Rick Jacobs, the president of the Union for Reform Judaism, questioned the continued membership of ZOA in the Conference of Major American Jewish Organizations by saying "we are now implicated by his views, his Islamophobia, his racism, full stop."

=== Barack Obama's birthplace ===
In a 2022 interview with the New Yorker, Klein defended President Trump's promotion of conspiracy theories questioning the birthplace of Barack Obama, claiming that Obama's autobiography cover jacket stated he was born in Kenya. Klein further stated that it was "very suspicious" that President Barack Obama did not release his birth certificate "when it was being challenged." Obama released his long-form birth certificate in 2011, confirming that he was born in Hawaii, while Obama's publishers released promotional material in 1991 misstating Obama's birthplace. Klein later clarified he believed that Barack Obama was born in the United States.

== Personal life ==
Klein is married to Rebecca "Rita" Klein, and has a married daughter, Rachael, and four grandchildren. Klein has Tourette syndrome.

== Testimony before government committees ==
In 2017, Klein submitted a letter to Congress which stated that "moving the U.S. Embassy to Israel's capital will achieve tremendous benefits for the United States and our allies throughout the world."

== Academic work ==
Klein served as a lecturer at Temple University and as a biostatistician at UCLA School of Public Health and the Linus Pauling Institute of Science and Medicine in Palo Alto, California. He has previously published work on epidemiology in academic journals. His research on nutrition and heart disease was cited by Discover Magazine as one of the Top 50 Scientific Studies of 1992.
