= Samson Cerfberr =

French soldier and author

Samson Cerfberr of Medelsheim (born at Strasburg about 1780; committed suicide at Paris, 1826) was a French soldier and author.

== Life ==
A French Jew and relative of Herz Cerfbeer of Medelsheim, he was born in Strasbourg, France, and held office in Westphalia under the name of "Medelsheim". He led an erratic and adventurous life, wandering the world and changing both his name religion several times.

Cerfberr joined the Ottoman army as a mercenary, and converted to Islam, adopting the name Ibrahim Mansur Effendi. In 1813, he fought against the rebel Serbs in the Eyalet of Bosnia, serving alongside Osman Gradaščević in the district of Zvornik; the Serbs were eventually defeated after the arrival of the Ottoman Grand Vizier Hursid Pasha later that year.

At the end of the war, he wandered throughout the East, sojourned for a time in Austria and Nafplio. Between 1816 and 1819, he served in the army of Ali Pasha of Ioannina.

On his return home, Cerfberr published a work entitled Mémoires sur la Grèce et l'Albanie Pendant le Gouvernement d'Ali-Pacha (1826).

== Work ==
- Mémoires sur la Grèce et l'Albanie Pendant le Gouvernement d'Ali-Pacha (Paris, 1826). The second edition of 1827, online from Google books, the second edition of 1828, online from Google books

== See also ==
- Selim III
- Mahmud II
- Ibrahim Bushati

== Annotations ==
- His name is also spelled Samson Cerf-Berr.

== Sources ==
- ; citing:
  - La Grande Encyclopédie, x.50;
  - Nouveau Larousse illustré, ii.627
