= Ahmed Al-Rumaihi =

Qatari diplomat

Chairman of Qatar Investments
- Incumbent
- Assumed office 2016

Qatari Ambassador to the United States

Ahmed Al-Rumaihi is a former Qatari diplomat in the United States. Currently, he is head of Qatar Investments, a new $100 billion internal division of sovereign wealth fund Qatar Investment Authority (QIA).

== Career ==
In or about 2014, Al-Rumaihi was put in charge of a new internal division of QIA called Qatar Investments.

== Controversy ==
=== BIG3 ===
Al-Rumaihi and other investors were sued by the rapper and actor Ice Cube and his business partner Jeff Kwatinetz in the Superior Court for Los Angeles County, California for $1.2 billion in damages for defamation, trade libel and interference with contractual relations. The legal complaint, filed April 5, 2018, by Geragos & Geragos, includes an allegation that Al-Rumaihi and other Qatari officials who were passive investors in the men's BIG3 basketball league had failed to fund their "small, passive, minority stake" but instead were using their money and influence to gain access to people connected to U.S. President Donald Trump. Al-Rumaihi met with Trump surrogates on 12 December 2016 and later stated, in a sworn declaration, that he bribed Trump administration officials. C-SPAN video of Trump Tower allegedly shows Al-Rumaihi entering Trump Tower on 12 December 2016 with Trump Attorney Michael Cohen at 7:42:30 and exiting at 9:08:15.

=== Qatar hacking campaign ===
In May 2018, Republican fundraiser Elliott Broidy added al-Rumaihi to his lawsuit charging Qatar with orchestrating a state-sponsored hacking campaign against him. Broidy alleges that it was Mohammed bin Hamad bin Khalifa Al Thani, the brother of the Qatar's emir, and al-Rumaihi who organized the campaign to discredit him.
