= List of members of the fifth Knesset =

The 120 members of the fifth Knesset were elected on 1 August 1961. The breakdown by party was as follows:

- Mapai: 42
- Herut: 17
- Liberal Party: 17
- National Religious Party: 12
- Mapam: 9
- Ahdut HaAvoda: 8
- Maki: 5
- Agudat Yisrael: 4
- Poalei Agudat Yisrael: 2
- Cooperation and Brotherhood: 2
- Progress and Development: 2

== Members of the Fifth Knesset ==
Party	Name
Mapai (42)	Yosef Almogi (until 1965)
Mapai (42)	Zalman Aran
Mapai (42)	Meir Argov
Mapai (42)	Ami Assaf
Mapai (42)	David Bar-Rav-Hai
Mapai (42)	Moshe Baram
Mapai (42)	Aharon Becker
Mapai (42)	David Ben-Gurion (until 1965)
Mapai (42)	Herzl Berger
Mapai (42)	Menachem Cohen
Mapai (42)	Yitzhak Coren
Mapai (42)	Moshe Dayan (until 1965)
Mapai (42)	Amos Degani (until 1965)
Mapai (42)	Abba Eban
Mapai (42)	Yosef Efrati
Mapai (42)	Levi Eshkol
Mapai (42)	Yosef Fischer
Mapai (42)	Akiva Govrin
Mapai (42)	Yisrael Guri
Mapai (42)	David Hacohen
Mapai (42)	Asher Hassin
Mapai (42)	Avraham Herzfeld
Mapai (42)	Beba Idelson
Mapai (42)	Yisrael Kargman
Mapai (42)	Yona Kesse (until 1964)
Mapai (42)	Kadish Luz
Mapai (42)	Golda Meir
Mapai (42)	Mordechai Namir
Mapai (42)	Dvora Netzer
Mapai (42)	Baruch Osnia
Mapai (42)	Shimon Peres (until 1965)
Mapai (42)	David Petel
Mapai (42)	Pinchas Sapir
Mapai (42)	Moshe Sardines
Mapai (42)	Moshe Sharett
Mapai (42)	Bechor-Shalom Sheetrit
Mapai (42)	Shmuel Shoresh
Mapai (42)	Yizhar Smilansky (until 1965)
Mapai (42)	Rachel Tzabari
Mapai (42)	Yisrael Yeshayahu
Mapai (42)	Giora Yoseftal
Mapai (42)	Haim Yosef Zadok
Herut (17)	Aryeh Altman
Herut (17)	Binyamin Arditi
Herut (17)	Binyamin Avniel
Herut (17)	Yohanan Bader
Herut (17)	Menachem Begin
Herut (17)	Aryeh Ben-Eliezer
Herut (17)	Haim Cohen-Meguri
Herut (17)	Avraham Drori
Herut (17)	Haim Landau
Herut (17)	Nahum Levin
Herut (17)	Eliyahu Meridor
Herut (17)	Ya'akov Meridor
Herut (17)	Esther Raziel-Naor
Herut (17)	Shabtai Shikhman
Herut (17)	Yosef Shofman
Herut (17)	Eliezer Shostak
Herut (17)	Avraham Tiar
Liberal Party (17)	Zalman Abramov
Liberal Party (17)	Peretz Bernstein
Liberal Party (17)	Benno Cohen (until 1965)
Liberal Party (17)	Idov Cohen
Liberal Party (17)	Rachel Cohen-Kagan (until 1965)
Liberal Party (17)	Yitzhak Golan (until 1965)
Liberal Party (17)	Yizhar Harari (until 1965)
Liberal Party (17)	Yitzhak Klinghoffer
Liberal Party (17)	Moshe Kol (until 1965)
Liberal Party (17)	Shlomo Perlstein
Liberal Party (17)	Elimelekh Rimalt
Liberal Party (17)	Pinchas Rosen (until 1965)
Liberal Party (17)	Yosef Sapir
Liberal Party (17)	Yosef Serlin
Liberal Party (17)	Yehuda Sha'ari (until 1965)
Liberal Party (17)	Baruch Uziel
Liberal Party (17)	Zvi Zimmerman
National Religious Party (12)	Shlomo-Yisrael Ben-Meir
National Religious Party (12)	Yosef Burg
National Religious Party (12)	Michael Hasani
National Religious Party (12)	Aharon-Ya'akov Greenberg
National Religious Party (12)	Mordechai Nurock
National Religious Party (12)	Yitzhak Rafael
National Religious Party (12)	Tova Sanhadray
National Religious Party (12)	Binyamin Shahor
National Religious Party (12)	Haim-Moshe Shapira
National Religious Party (12)	Moshe Unna
National Religious Party (12)	Zerach Warhaftig
National Religious Party (12)	Frija Zoaretz
Mapam (9)	Yisrael Barzilai
Mapam (9)	Mordechai Bentov
Mapam (9)	Ya'akov Hazan
Mapam (9)	Yussuf Hamis
Mapam (9)	Ya'akov Riftin
Mapam (9)	Hanan Rubin
Mapam (9)	Victor Shem-Tov
Mapam (9)	Emma Talmi
Mapam (9)	Meir Ya'ari
Ahdut HaAvoda (8)	Yigal Allon
Ahdut HaAvoda (8)	Yisrael Bar-Yehuda
Ahdut HaAvoda (8)	Yitzhak Ben-Aharon
Ahdut HaAvoda (8)	Mordechai Bibi
Ahdut HaAvoda (8)	Moshe Carmel
Ahdut HaAvoda (8)	Yisrael Galili
Ahdut HaAvoda (8)	Ruth Haktin
Ahdut HaAvoda (8)	Nahum Nir
Rafi (8)	Yosef Almogi (after 1965)
Rafi (8)	Gideon Ben-Yisrael
Rafi (8)	David Ben-Gurion (after 1965)
Rafi (8)	Moshe Dayan (after 1965)
Rafi (8)	Amos Degani (after 1965)
Rafi (8)	Hannah Lamdan
Rafi (8)	Shimon Peres (after 1965)
Rafi (8)	Yizhar Smilansky (after 1965)
Independent Liberals (7)	Benno Cohen (after 1965)
Independent Liberals (7)	Rachel Cohen-Kagan (after 1965)
Independent Liberals (7)	Yitzhak Golan (after 1965)
Independent Liberals (7)	Yizhar Harari (after 1965)
Independent Liberals (7)	Moshe Kol (after 1965)
Independent Liberals (7)	Pinchas Rosen (after 1965)
Independent Liberals (7)	Yehuda Sha'ari (after 1965)
Maki (5)	Shmuel Mikunis
Maki (5)	Moshe Sneh
Maki (5)	Esther Vilenska
Maki (5)	Meir Vilner (until 1965)
Maki (5)	Tawfik Toubi (until 1965)
Agudat Yisrael (4)	Shlomo-Ya'akov Gross
Agudat Yisrael (4)	Yitzhak-Meir Levin
Agudat Yisrael (4)	Shlomo Lorincz
Agudat Yisrael (4)	Menachem Porush
Poalei Agudat Yisrael (2)	Kalman Kahana
Poalei Agudat Yisrael (2)	Ya'akov Katz
Rakah (2)	Meir Vilner (after 1965)
Rakah (2)	Tawfik Toubi (after 1965)
Cooperation and Brotherhood (2)	Jabr Muadi
Cooperation and Brotherhood (2)	Diyab Obeid
Progress and Development (2)	Ahmed A-Dahar
Progress and Development (2)	Elias Nakhleh

=== Replacements ===
MK	Replaced	Party	Date	Notes
Emile Habibi	Meir Vilner	Maki	9 October 1961	Left party to form Rakah
Hannah Lamdan	Giora Yoseftal	Mapai	23 August 1962	Left party to form Rafi
Gideon Ben-Yisrael	Herzl Berger	Mapai	24 October 1962	Left party to form Rafi
Yosef Kushnir	Hanan Rubin	Mapam	24 October 1962	
Shalom-Avraham Shaki	Mordechai Nurock	National Religious Party	8 November 1962	
Moshe Kelmer	Aharon-Ya'akov Greenberg	National Religious Party	2 April 1963	
Mordechai Zar	Ami Assaf	Mapai	17 May 1963	
Aharon Goldstein	Idov Cohen	Liberal Party	11 November 1963	Party merged with Herut to form Gahal
Jenia Tversky	Meir Argov	Mapai	24 November 1963	
Aharon Yadlin	Jenia Tversky	Mapai	4 May 1964	
Halil-Salim Jabara	Yitzhak Ben-Aharon	Ahdut HaAvoda	11 May 1964	
Yosef Kremerman	Avraham Drori	Herut	20 August 1964	Party merged with the Liberal Party to form Gahal
Moshe Aram	Yisrael Bar-Yehuda	Ahdut HaAvoda	4 May 1865	
Ari Ankorion	Moshe Sharett	Mapai	7 July 1965	
