= Argov =

Proper name

Argov is a proper name. It occurs in the Hebrew Bible as a given name (where it is associated with the placename Argob) and since the 1900s has been used as a Jewish surname.

Notable people with the surname include:

- Meir Argov (1905–63), Russian Empire-born Israeli Zionist activist and politician
- Sasha Argov (1914–95), Russian-born Israeli composer
- Shlomo Argov (1929–2003), Israeli diplomat
- Zohar Argov, real name Zohar Orkabi.(1955–87), Israeli singer
