= Bar Yehuda Airfield =

Bar Yehuda Airfield מנחת בר־יהודה
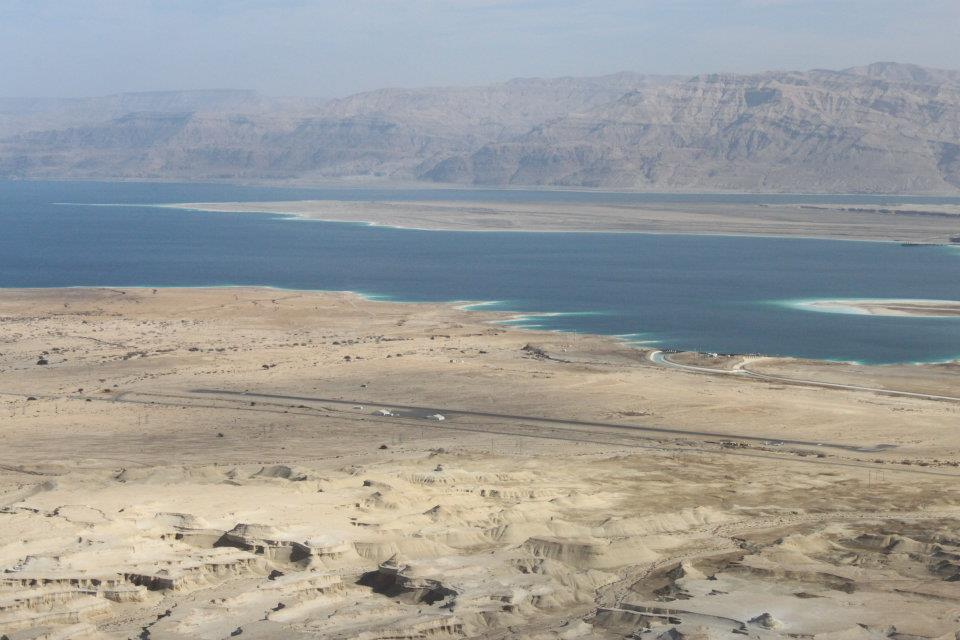
- IATA: MTZ; ICAO: LLMZ

Summary
- Airport type: Public
- Operator: Sun Air Aviation, Tamar Regional Council
- Location: Masada, Israel
- Elevation AMSL: −378 m / −1,240 ft
- Coordinates: 31°19′41.41″N 35°23′18.99″E
- Interactive map of Bar Yehuda Airfield

Runways
Direction	Length		Surface
Direction	m	ft	Surface
01/19	1,200	3,937	Asphalt

Bar Yehuda Airfield (Hebrew: מנחת בר־יהודה, romanized: minḥat bar-yehuda; sometimes known as Masada Airfield, IATA: MTZ, ICAO: LLMZ), named after Yisrael Bar-Yehuda, is a small desert airfield located in the southern Judean desert, between Arad and Ein Gedi, west of the Dead Sea. Opened in 1963, it is just 4.2 kilometres (2 5/8 mi) from the Masada fortress access and about one hour and a half drive from Jerusalem. The airfield is a public concession, mainly used as an alternate airport, and for charter and sightseeing flights.

Located at 378 m (1,240 ft) below mean sea level, Bar Yehuda Airfield is the lowest airport in the world.

== See also ==
- Extreme points of Earth - Lowest attainable by transportation
- List of places on land with elevations below sea level
