= Furnace Creek Airport =

Lowest elevation airport in the United States

Furnace Creek Airport Furnace Creek Emergency Landing Field
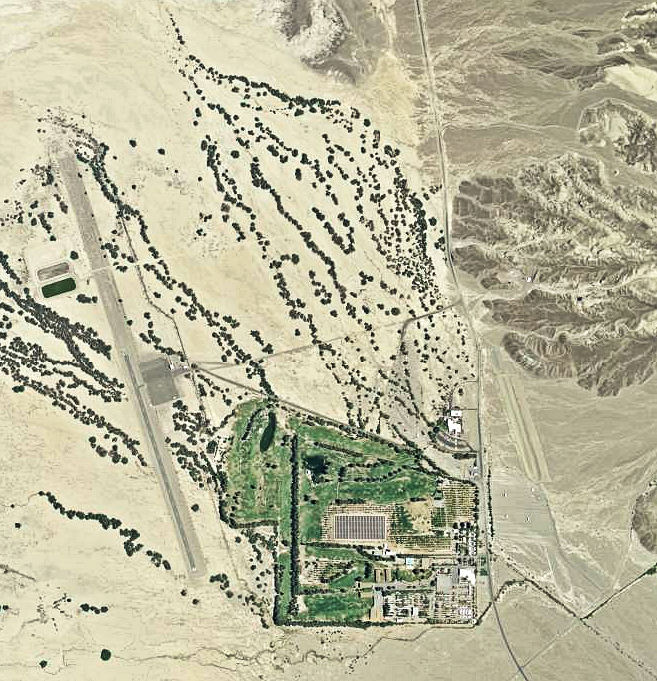
- 2006 USGS airphoto
- IATA: DTH; ICAO: none; FAA LID: L06

Summary
- Operator: U.S. Dept. of the Interior
- Elevation AMSL: −210 ft (−64 m)
- Coordinates: 36°27′50″N 116°52′53″W

Map
- Location of Furnace Creek Airport

Furnace Creek Airport (IATA: DTH, FAA LID: L06) is a public airport located 0.75 miles (1.21 km) west of Furnace Creek, Death Valley, serving Inyo County, California, USA. This general aviation airport covers 40 acres (16 ha) and has one runway. At −210 feet (−64 m) under MSL, it is the lowest-elevation airport in North America and the second-lowest in the world.

== History ==
The original airfield, was built in 1929 by the Pacific Coast Borax Company. It served as an emergency landing field for Army and Navy military aircraft during WWII, and brought tourists into the newly declared National Monument.

The current airfield was opened in May 1954, one mile west of the previous landing strip along State Route 190, adjacent to Sunset Campground. The prior airfield is visible in aerial imagery, but is now used only as an overflow area for Sunset Campground during busy periods, such as the '49ers Encampment. For the first several years it was open, the airfield was plagued with problems with the pavement; the entirety of the 5,500 foot runway originally built quickly deteriorated and had to be repaired almost immediately after opening. The current runway is thinner and shorter, though the older pavement is still visible in satellite imagery.

== See also ==
- California World War II Army Airfields
- List of places on land with elevations below sea level
- List of extreme points of the United States
