= List of lowest airports =

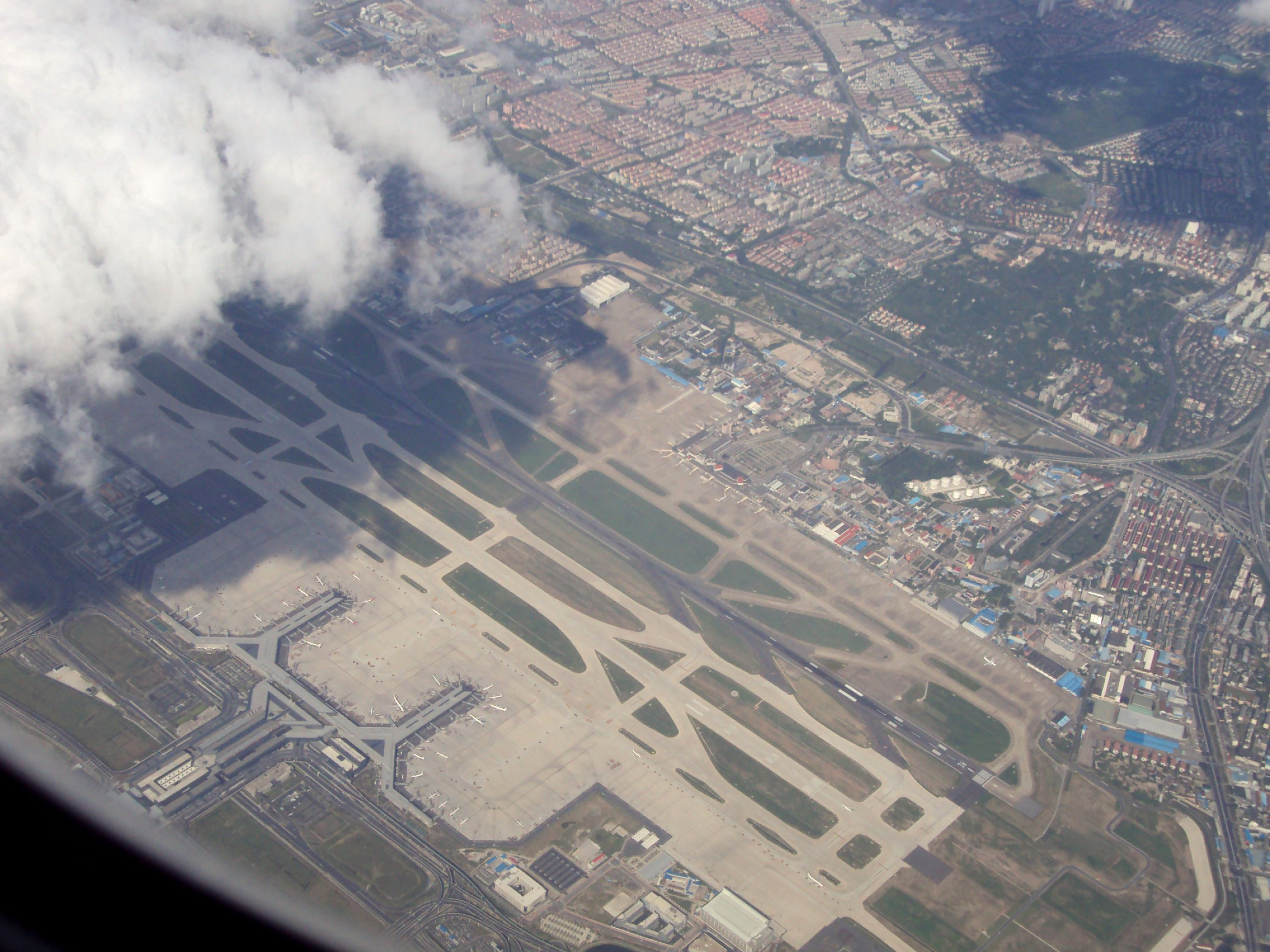
Aerial photo of Shanghai Hongqiao International Airport

This is a list of the world's lowest civilian airports, situated less than 10 m (33 ft) above mean sea level. The facility must be public, include at least one hard paved runway, and support general or commercial aviation as of 2019.

Rank	Airport name	City or region served	Country	IATA code	ICAO code	Coordinates	Elevation (m)	Elevation (ft)
1	Bar Yehuda Airfield (Note: Lowest airport in Asia)	Masada, Israel	Israel	MTZ	LLMZ	31°19′41″N 35°23′19″E	−385.88	−1,266
2	Furnace Creek Airport (Note: Lowest airport in North America)	Inyo County, California	United States	DTH		36°27′50″N 116°52′53″W	−63.31	−208
4	Cliff Hatfield Memorial Airport	Imperial County, California	United States	CLR	KCLR	33°07′53″N 115°31′17″W	−55.41	−182
5	Brawley Municipal Airport	Imperial County, California	United States	BWC	KBWC	32°59′35″N 115°31′01″W	−38.95	−128
6	Jacqueline Cochran Regional Airport	Riverside County, California	United States	TRM	KTRM	33°37′36″N 116°09′35″W	−34.87	−114
7	Atyrau Airport (Note: Lowest international airport)	Atyrau, Kazakhstan	Kazakhstan	GUW	UATG	47°07′19″N 051°49′17″E	−21.94	−72
8	Ramsar International Airport	Tonekabon and Ramsar, Mazandaran	Iran	RZR	OINR	36°54′35.67″N 050°40′46.52″E	−21.3	−70
9	Imperial County Airport	Imperial County, California	United States	IPL	KIPL	32°50′03″N 115°34′43″W	−16.34	−54
10	Rotterdam The Hague Airport (Note: Lowest airport in Europe)	Rotterdam, Netherlands	Netherlands	RTM	EHRD	51°57′25″N 04°26′25″E	−4.57	−15
11	Lelystad Airport	Lelystad, Netherlands	Netherlands	LEY	EHLE	51°27′37″N 05°31′38″E	−3.96	−13
12	Amsterdam Airport Schiphol	Amsterdam, Netherlands	Netherlands	AMS	EHAM	52°18′29″N 004°45′51″E	−3.35	−11
13	South Lafourche Leonard Miller Jr. Airport	Lafourche Parish, Louisiana	United States		KGAO	29°26′28″N 090°15′40″W	0	0
14	Zuwarah Airport (Note: Lowest airport in Africa)	Zuwarah, Libya	Libya	WAX	HLZW	32°57′10″N 12°01′00″E	0	0
15	Emden Airport	Emden, Germany	Germany	EME	EDWE	53°23′28″N 007°13′39″E	0.61	2 ft 0 in
16	Louis Armstrong International Airport	New Orleans, Louisiana	United States	MSY	KMSY	29°59′36″N 090°15′29″W	0.9	2 ft 11 in
17	Faa'a International Airport	Tahiti, French Polynesia	France	PPT	NTAA	17°33′24″S 149°36′41″W	1.52	5 ft 0 in
18	Key West International Airport	Key West, Florida	United States	EYW	KEYW	24°33′22″N 081°45′34″W	1.52	5 ft 0 in
19	Suvarnabhumi Airport	Racha Thewa, Bang Phli, Samut Prakan, Bangkok Metropolian Region,Thailand	Thailand	BKK	VTBS	13°41′33″N 100°45′00″E	1.52	5 ft 0 in
20	Godofredo P. Ramos Airport (Caticlan Airport)	Malay, Aklan	Philippines	MPH	RPVE	11°55′29″N 121°57′18″E	2	6 ft 7 in
21	Pagadian Airport	Pagadian, Zamboanga del Sur	Philippines	PAG	RPMP	07°49′38″N 123°27′30″E	2	6 ft 7 in
	Pattani Airport	Bo Thong, Nong Chik, Pattani	Thailand	PAN	VTSK		2	6 ft 7 in
22	Ballina Byron Gateway Airport	Ballina, New South Wales	Australia	BNK	YBNA	28°50′00″S 153°33′42″E	2.13	7 ft 0 in
23	Merimbula Airport	Merimbula, New South Wales	Australia	MIM	YMER	36°54′31″S 149°54′05″E	2.13	7 ft 0 in
24	Rafael Núñez International Airport (Note: Lowest airport in South America)	Cartagena, Colombia	Colombia	CTG	SKCG	10°26′33″N 75°30′47″W	2.13	7 ft 0 in
25	Redcliffe Airport	Redcliffe, Queensland	Australia		YRED	27°12′24″S 153°04′06″E	2.13	7 ft 0 in
26	Venice Marco Polo Airport	Venice, Italy	Italy	VCE	LIPZ	45°30′19″N 012°21′07″E	2.13	7 ft 0 in
27	Bahrain International Airport	Manama, Bahrain	Bahrain	BAH	OBBI	26°16′15″N 050°38′01″E	2.4	7 ft 10 in
28	Miami International Airport	Miami, Florida	United States	MIA	KMIA	25°47′36″N 080°17′26″W	2.44	8 ft 0 in
29	Miami-Opa Locka Executive Airport	Miami-Dade County, Florida	United States	OPF	KOPF	25°54′27″N 080°16′42″W	2.44	8 ft 0 in
30	Sir Barry Bowen Municipal Airport	Belize City, Belize	Belize	TZA	MZBE	17°31′03″N 88°11′45″W	2.44	8 ft 0 in
31	Bonriki International Airport	Tarawa, Kiribati	Kiribati	TRW	NGTA	01°22′54″N 173°08′49″E	2.74	9 ft 0 in
32	Don Mueang International Airport	Bangkok, Thailand	Thailand	DMK	VTBD	13°54′45″N 100°36′24″E	2.74	9 ft 0 in
33	Juanda International Airport	Sidoarjo, East Java	Indonesia	SUB	WARR	07°22′47″S 112°47′13″E	2.74	9 ft 0 in
34	Nouakchott–Oumtounsy International Airport	Nouakchott, Mauritania	Mauritania	NKC	GQNO	18°18′36″N 015°58′11″W	2.74	9 ft 0 in
35	Oakland International Airport	San Francisco Bay Area, California	United States	OAK	KOAK	37°43′17″N 122°13′15″W	2.74	9 ft 0 in
34	Luis Muñoz Marín International Airport	San Juan, Puerto Rico	Puerto Rico	SJU	TJSJ	18°26′21″N 066°00′07″W	2.93	9 ft 7 in
37	Northeast Florida Regional Airport	St. Augustine, Florida	United States	UST	KSGJ	29°57′33.3″N 081°20′23″W	2.99	9 ft 10 in
38	Tugdan (Tablas) Airport	Alcantara, Romblon	Philippines	TBH	RPVU	12°18′39″N 122°5′4″E	3	10
39	Alta Airport	Alta, Finnmark	Norway	ALF	ENAT	69°58′34″N 023°22′18″E	3.0	10
40	Molde Airport	Molde, Møre og Romsdal	Norway	MOL	ENML	62°44′41″N 007°15′45″E	3.0	10
41	Røst Airport	Røst, Nordland	Norway	RET	ENRS	67°31′40″N 12°06′12″E	3.0	10
42	Aalborg Airport	Aalborg, Denmark	Denmark	AAL	EKYT	57°05′34″N 009°50′57″E	3.05	10
43	Barisal Airport	Barisal, Bangladesh	Bangladesh	BZL	VGBR	22°48′04″N 90°18′04″E	3.05	10
44	Bocas del Toro "Isla Colón" International Airport	Bocas del Toro, Isla Colón	Panama	BOC	MPBO	9°20′27″N 82°15′00″W	3.05	10
45	Cairns Airport	Cairns, Queensland	Australia	CNS	YBCS	16°53′09″S 145°45′19″E	3.05	10
46	Coconut Island Airport	Coconut Island (Poruma Island), Queensland	Australia	CNC	YCCT	10°03′S 143°04′E	3.05	10
47	Cocos (Keeling) Islands Airport	West Island, Cocos (Keeling) Islands	Australia	CCK	YPCC	12°11′19″S 096°49′50″E	3.05	10
48	Edward River Airport	Pormpuraaw, Queensland	Australia	EDR	YPMP	14°53′48″S 141°36′34″E	3.05	10
49	El Porvenir Airport	El Porvenir, Guna Yala	Panama	PVE	MPVR	9°33′30″N 78°56′50″W	3.05	10
50	Penang International Airport	Bayan Lepas, Penang	Malaysia	PEN	WMKP	05°17′49.7″N 100°16′36.71″E	3.05	10
51	San Fernando Airport	San Fernando, Buenos Aires	Argentina		SADF	34°27′10″S 58°35′20″W	3.05	10
52	Rio de Janeiro - Santos Dumont Airport	Rio de Janeiro	Brazil	SDU	SBRJ	22°54′36″S 043°09′45″W	3.05	10
53	Shanghai Hongqiao International Airport	Shanghai, China	China	SHA	ZSSS	31°11′53″N 121°20′11″E	3.05	10
54	Tianjin Binhai International Airport	Tianjin	China	TSN	ZBTJ	39°07′28″N 117°20′46″E	3.05	10
55	Yancheng Nanyang International Airport	Yancheng, Jiangsu	China	YNZ	ZSYN	33°25′33″N 120°12′11″E	3.05	10
56	Yorke Island Airport	York Island, Queensland	Australia	OKR	YYKI	09°45′12″S 143°24′16″E	3.05	10
57	St. Pete–Clearwater International Airport	Tampa Bay area, Florida	United States	PIE	KPIE	27°54′36″N 082°41′15″W	3.20	10
58	Jenderal Ahmad Yani International Airport	Semarang, Central Java	Indonesia	SRG	WAHS	06°58′17″S 110°22′27″E	3.35	11
59	Bremerhaven Airport	Bremerhaven, Germany	Germany	BRV	EDWB	53°30′25″N 08°34′22″E	3.35	11
60	Ordu–Giresun Airport	Gülyalı, Ordu	Turkey	OGU	LTCB	40°58′00″N 38°04′48″E	3.35	11
61	Salgado Filho International Airport	Porto Alegre, Rio Grande do Sul	Brazil	POA	SBPA	29°59′38″S 051°10′16″W	3.35	11
62	Agatti Airport	Lakshadweep	India	AGX	VOAT	10°49′41″N 72°10′44″E	3.66	12
63	Barcelona–El Prat Josep Tarradellas Airport	Barcelona, Spain	Spain	BCN	LEBL	41°17′49″N 002°04′42″E	3.66	12
64	Nice Côte d'Azur Airport	Nice, Alpes-Maritimes	France	NCE	LFMN	43°39′55″N 007°12′54″E	3.66	12
65	Port Macquarie Airport	Port Macquarie, New South Wales	Australia	PQQ	YPMQ	53°07′30″N 06°35′00″E	3.66	12
66	Rottnest Island Airport	Rottnest Island, Western Australia	Australia	RTS	YRTI	32°00′24″S 115°32′23″E	3.66	12
67	Seychelles International Airport	Victoria, Seychelles	Seychelles	SEZ	FSIA	04°40′28″S 55°31′19″E	3.66	12
68	Shah Amanat International Airport	Chittagong, Bangladesh	Bangladesh	CGP	VGEG	22°14′59″N 91°48′48″E	3.66	12
69	Brisbane Airport	Brisbane, Queensland	Australia	BNE	YBBN	27°23′00″S 153°07′06″E	3.96	13
70	Cannes – Mandelieu Airport	Cannes, France	France	CEQ	LFMD	43°32′47″N 006°57′15″E	3.96	13
71	Carnarvon Airport	Carnarvon, Western Australia	Australia	CVQ	YCAR	24°52′50″S 113°40′20″E	3.96	13
72	Daniel K. Inouye International Airport	Honolulu, Hawaii	United States	HNL	PHNL	21°19′07″N 157°55′21″W	3.96	13
73	Hamad International Airport	Doha, Qatar	Qatar	DOH	OTHH	25°16′23″N 51°36′29″E	3.96	13
74	Hobart Airport	Hobart, Tasmania	Australia	HBA	YMHB	42°50′12″S 147°30′36″E	3.96	13
75	John F. Kennedy International Airport	New York City, New York	United States	JFK	KJFK	40°38′23″N 073°46′44″W	3.96	13
76	Ostend–Bruges International Airport	Bruges and Ostend, Belgium	Belgium	OST	EBOS	51°11′56″N 002°51′44″E	3.96	13
77	San Francisco International Airport	San Francisco, California	United States	SFO	KSFO	37°37′08″N 122°22′30″W	3.96	13
78	Shanghai Pudong International Airport	Shanghai, China	China	PVG	ZSPD	31°08′36″N 121°48′19″E	3.96	13
79	Dipolog Airport	Dipolog, Zamboanga del Norte	Philippines	DPL	RPMG	08°36′5″N 123°20′31″E	4	13
	Nakhon Si Thammarat International Airport	Pak Phun, Nakhon Si Thammarat, Nakhon Si Thammarat	Thailand	NST	VTSF		4	13
80	Batticaloa International Airport	Batticaloa, Eastern Province	Sri Lanka	BTC	VCCB	07°42′19″N 081°40′40″E	4.27	14
81	Moruya Airport	Moruya, New South Wales	Australia	MYA	YMRY	35°53′52″S 150°08′40″E	4.27	14
82	Vancouver International Airport	Vancouver, British Columbia	Canada	YVR	CYVR	49°11′41″N 123°11′02″W	4.27	14
83	Chubu Centrair International Airport	Nagoya, Japan	Japan	NGO	RJGG	34°51′30″N 136°48′19″E	4.57	15
84	Cozumel International Airport	Cozumel, Quintana Roo	Mexico	CZM	MMCZ	20°30′54″N 86°55′44″W	4.57	15
85	Gibraltar International Airport	Gibraltar (UK) and Campo de Gibraltar (Spain)	Gibraltar	GIB	LXGB	36°09′04″N 005°20′59″W	4.57	15
86	Gisborne Airport	Gisborne, North Island	New Zealand	GIS	NZGS	38°39′48″S 177°58′42″E	4.57	15
87	Hamilton Island Airport	Whitsunday Islands, Queensland	Australia	HTI	YBHM	20°21′29″S 148°57′06″E	4.57	15
88	Leonardo da Vinci–Fiumicino Airport	Rome, Italy	Italy	FCO	LIRF	41°48′01″N 012°14′20″E	4.57	15
89	Philip S. W. Goldson International Airport	Belize City, Belize	Belize	BZE	MZBZ	17°32′21″N 088°18′30″W	4.57	15
90	San Sebastián Airport	San Sebastián, Basque Autonomous Community	Spain	EAS	LESO	43°21′23″N 01°47′26″W	4.57	15
91	Trivandrum International Airport	Thiruvananthapuram, Kerala	India	TRV	VOTV	8.48°N 76.92°E	4.57	15
92	Netaji Subhas Chandra Bose International Airport	Kolkata, West Bengal	India	CCU	VECC	22°39′17″N 088°26′48″E	4.88	16
93	Nouadhibou International Airport	Nouadhibou, Dakhlet Nouadhibou	Mauritania	NDB	GQPP	20°55′59″N 017°01′47″W	4.88	16
94	Sanga-Sanga Airport	Bongao, Tawi-Tawi	Philippines	TWT	RPMN	05°02′49″N 119°44′34″E	5	16
95	Sibulan Airport	Dumaguete, Negros Oriental	Philippines	DGT	RPVD	09°20′03″N 123°18′04″E	5	16
	Chumphon Airport	Chum Kho, Pathio, Chumphon	Thailand	CJM	VTSE		5	16
	Narathiwat Airport	Khok Khian, Narathiwat, Narathiwat	Thailand	NAW	VTSC		5	16
96	Copenhagen Airport, Kastrup	Copenhagen, Denmark	Denmark	CPH	EKCH	55°37′05″N 012°39′22″E	5.18	17
97	Groningen Airport Eelde	Eelde, Netherlands	Netherlands	GRQ	EHGG	53°07′30″N 06°35′00″E	5.18	17
98	Lord Howe Island Airport	Lord Howe Island, Tasman Sea	Australia	LDH	YLHI	31°32′18″S 159°04′38″E	5.18	17
99	Nausori International Airport	Suva, Viti Levu Island	Fiji	SUV	NFNA	18°02′36″S 178°33′33″E	5.18	17
100	San Diego International Airport	San Diego, California	United States	SAN	KSAN	32°44′01″N 117°11′23″W	5.18	17
101	Sundsvall–Timrå Airport	Sundsvall, Västernorrlands län	Sweden	SDL	ESNN	62°31′41″N 17°26′38″E	5.2	17
102	Newark Liberty International Airport	New York metropolitan area and New Jersey	United States	EWR	KEWR	40°41′33″N 074°10′07″W	5.30	17
103	Aeroparque Jorge Newbery	Buenos Aires, Argentina	Argentina	AEP	SABE	34°33′32″S 058°24′59″W	5.49	18
104	Coffs Harbour Airport	Coffs Harbour, New South Wales	Australia	CFS	YCFS	30°19′12″S 153°07′00″E	5.49	18
105	Karumba Airport	Karumba, Queensland	Australia	KRB	YKMB	17°27′18″S 140°49′54″E	5.49	18
106	Palm Island Airport	Great Palm Island, Queensland	Australia	PMK	YPAM	26°36′12″S 153°05′30″E	5.49	18
107	Songshan Airport	Taipei, Taiwan	Taiwan	TSA	RCSS	25°04′10″N 121°33′06″E	5.49	18
108	Sunshine Coast Airport	Marcoola, Queensland	Australia	MCY	YBSU	26°36′12″S 153°05′30″E	5.49	18
109	Kalmar Airport	Kalmar, Kalmar län	Sweden	KLR	ESMQ	56°41′07″N 16°17′15″E	5.5	18
110	Townsville Airport	Townsville, Queensland	Australia	TSV	YBTL	19°15′12″S 146°45′54″E	5.49	18
111	Learmonth Airport	Exmouth, Western Australia	Australia	LEA	YPLM	22°14′09″S 114°05′19″E	5.79	19
112	London City Airport	London, England	United Kingdom	LCY	EGLC	51°30′19″N 000°03′19″E	5.79	19
113	Mackay Airport	South Mackay, Queensland	Australia	MKY	YBMK	21°10′18″S 149°10′47″E	5.79	19
114	Rarotonga International Airport	Avarua, Rarotonga	Cook Islands	RAR	NCRG	21°12′10″S 159°48′20″W	5.79	19
115	Logan International Airport	Boston, Massachusetts	United States	BOS	KBOS	42°21′47″N 071°00′23″W	5.82	19
116	Surigao Airport	Surigao City, Surigao del Norte	Philippines	SUG	RPMS	09°45′27″N 125°28′46″E	6	20
117	Adelaide Airport	Adelaide, South Australia	Australia	ADL	YPAD	34°56′42″S 138°31′50″E	6.10	20
118	Cancún International Airport	Cancún, Quintana Roo	Mexico	CUN	MMUN	21°02′12″N 86°52′37″W	6.10	20
119	Flamingo International Airport	Bonaire, Caribbean Netherlands	Netherlands	BON	TNCB	12°07′52″N 068°16′07″W	6.10	20
	Surat Thani International Airport	Hua Toei, Phunphin, Surat Thani	Thailand	URT	VTSB	09°07′57″N 99°08′08″E	6.1	20
120	Grand Case-Espérance Airport	Saint-Martin	France	SFG	TFFG	18°06′02″N 063°02′56″W	6.1	20
121	José Joaquín de Olmedo International Airport	Guayaquil, Guayas Province	Ecuador	GYE	SEGU	02°09′27″S 79°53′01″W	6.10	20
122	Kingscote Airport	Kangaroo Island, South Australia	Australia	KGC	YKSC	35°42′50″S 137°31′18″E	6.10	20
123	Macau International Airport	Taipa, Macau	Macau	MFM	VMMC	22°08′58″N 113°35′29″E	6.10	20
124	Virginia Airport	Durban, KwaZulu-Natal	South Africa	VIR	FAVG	29°46′14″S 031°03′30″E	6.1	20
125	Burketown Airport	Burketown, Queensland	Australia	BUC	YBKT	17°44′55″S 139°32′04″E	6.40	21
126	Gold Coast Airport	Gold Coast, Queensland	Australia	OOL	YBCG	28°09′54″S 153°30′22″E	6.40	21
127	Sydney Airport	Sydney, New South Wales	Australia	SYD	YSSY	33°56′46″S 151°10′38″E	6.40	21
128	San Pédro Airport	San-Pédro, Ivory Coast	Ivory Coast	SPY	DISP	4°44′48″N 6°39′40″W	6.7	22
129	Singapore Changi Airport	Singapore	Singapore	SIN	WSSS	01°21′33″N 103°59′22″E	6.7	22
130	Thessaloniki Airport	Thessaloniki, Macedonia	Greece	SKG	LGTS	40°31′11″N 22°58′15″E	6.7	22
131	Auckland Airport	Auckland, North Island	New Zealand	AKL	NZAA	37°00′29″S 174°47′30″E	7.01	23
132	Incheon International Airport	Seoul, South Korea	South Korea	ICN	RKSI	37°27′48″N 126°26′24″E	7.01	23
133	Kualanamu International Airport	Deli Serdang, North Sumatra	Indonesia	KNO	WIMM	03°38′32″N 98°53′7″E	7.01	23
134	Onslow Airport	Onslow, Western Australia	Australia	ONS	YOLW	21°40′06″S 115°06′47″E	7.01	23
135	Faro Airport	Faro, Algarve	Portugal	FAO	LPFR	37°00′52″N 007°57′57″W	7.32	24
136	Cooktown Airport	Cooktown, Queensland	Australia	CTN	YCKN	15°26′41″S 145°11′04″E	7.92	26
137	Kansai International Airport	Osaka, Japan	Japan	KIX	RJBB	34°26′03″N 135°13′58″E	7.92	26
138	Carriel Sur International Airport	Talcahuano, Biobío Region	Chile	CCP	SCIE	36°46′21″S 73°03′47″W	8	26
139	Laoag International Airport	Laoag City, Ilocos Norte	Philippines	LAO	RPLI	18°10′41″N 120°31′55″E	8	26
140	Moises R. Espinosa Airport	Masbate City, Masbate	Philippines	MBT	RPVJ	12°22′10″N 123°37′45″E	8	26
141	Aden Adde International Airport	Mogadishu	Somalia	MGQ	HCMM	02°00′49″N 045°18′17″E	8.53	28
142	Hong Kong International Airport	Hong Kong and Pearl River Delta	Hong Kong	HKG	VHHH	22°18′32″N 113°54′52″E	8.53	28
143	Honiara International Airport	Guadalcanal	Solomon Islands	HIR	AGGH	09°25′41″S 160°03′17″E	8.53	28
144	Rio de Janeiro/Galeão International Airport	Rio de Janeiro	Brazil	GIG	SBGL	22°48′36″S 043°15′02″W	8.53	28
145	Karratha Airport	Karratha, Western Australia	Australia	KTA	YPKA	20°42′44″S 116°46′24″E	8.84	29
146	Mactan–Cebu International Airport	Lapu-Lapu City, Cebu	Philippines	CEB	RPVM	10°18′26″N 123°58′44″E	9	30
147	Cochin International Airport	Kochi, Kerala	India	COK	VOCI	10°09′19″N 76°23′28″E	9.14	30
148	Inhambane Airport	Inhambane Province	Mozambique	INH	FQIN	23°52′35.15″S 35°24′30.76″E	9.14	30
149	Shellharbour Airport	Albion Park Rail, New South Wales	Australia	WOL	YSHL	34°33′40″S 150°47′19″E	9.44	31
150	Newcastle Airport	Newcastle, New South Wales	Australia	NTL	YWLM	32°47′42″S 151°50′04″E	9.45	31
151	Roberts International Airport	Monrovia, Liberia	Liberia	ROB	GLRB	06°14′02″N 010°21′44″W	9.45	31

== See also ==
- List of highest airports
