= Aharon Remez =

Israeli diplomat (1919–1994)

- אהרן רמז
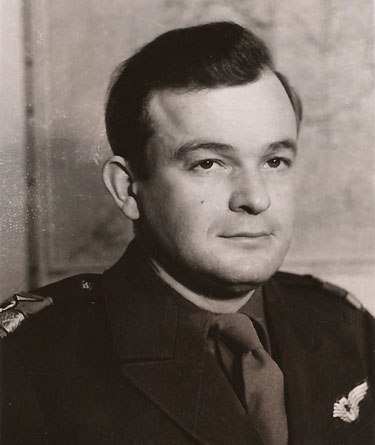

4th Israeli Ambassador to the United Kingdom
- In office 1965–1970
- Preceded by: Arthur Lurie
- Succeeded by: Michael Comay

Personal details
- Born: 8 May 1919 Tel Aviv, Mandatory Palestine
- Died: 3 April 1994 (aged 74) Jerusalem, Israel
- Party: Mapai

Military service
- Allegiance: Israel
- Branch/service: Royal Air Force; Israeli Air Force
- Rank: Aluf
- Battles/wars: World War II; 1948 Arab–Israeli War

Aluf Aharon Remez (Hebrew: אהרן רמז; 8 May 1919 – 3 April 1994) was an Israeli civil servant, politician and diplomat, and the second commander of the Israeli Air Force.

== Biography ==
Born in Tel Aviv in 1919, Remez's father David was Israel's first Minister of Transportation. He joined the Haganah in 1936. Three years later he was sponsored by the Jewish Agency to receive flying lessons in New Jersey. Whilst in the United States he also served as an emissary of the Habonim movement between 1939 and 1942.

In December 1942 he enlisted in the Royal Air Force, trained to fly in Canada, and completed his training in the United Kingdom. He was then posted to the Western European theater of World War II as a fighter pilot with No. 41 Squadron RAF in 1945. During the final weeks of the war in Europe Remez flew around fifty missions, attacking German infrastructure targets and providing air cover for Allied armored forces. He remained a pilot with the squadron until March 1946.

Following the end of the war he helped organise illegal immigration from Europe. He was discharged from the RAF in 1947 and rejoined the Haganah, in which he was appointed operations officer and chief of staff of its air wing, Sherut Avir. In July 1948 he became the second commander of the newly created Israeli Air Force, succeeding Yisrael Amir. He led it through much of the 1948 Arab-Israeli War and served as its commander until December 1950.

Between 1951 and 1953 he headed the Ministry of Defense's purchasing delegation to the United States. From 1953 until 1954 he served as aviation advisor to Defense Minister David Ben-Gurion, and from 1954 until 1959 was a member of the Solel Boneh board.

He was elected to the Knesset on the Mapai list in 1955, but resigned his seat on 19 December 1957, and was replaced by Amos Degani. Between 1959 and 1960 he worked as the administrative director of the Weizmann Institute, and later served as director of the Department for International Co-operation in Ministry of Foreign Affairs.

In 1965 he was appointed ambassador the United Kingdom, a post he held until 1970. From 1970 until 1977 he headed the Port Authority, and from 1977 until 1981 chaired the Israel Airports Authority.
