= Heshel Frumkin =

Israeli politician (1896-1974)

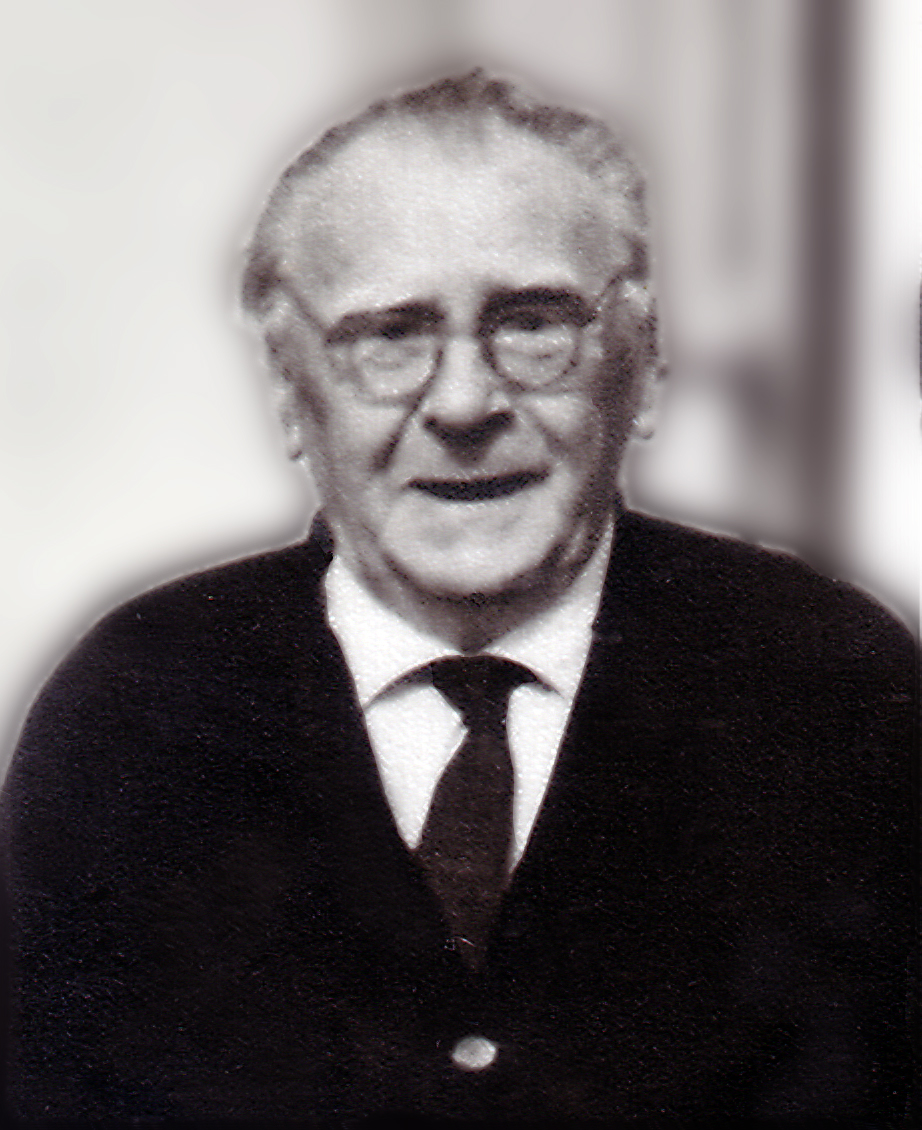

Faction represented in the Knesset
- 1949–1951: Mapai

Personal details
- Born: 1896 Babruysk, Russian Empire
- Died: 11 April 1974 (aged 77–78)

Heshel Frumkin (Hebrew: הֶשֶל פְרוּמְקִין; 1896 –11 April 1974) was an Israeli economist and politician.

== Biography ==
Born in Babruysk in the Russian Empire (today in Belarus), Frumkin was educated in a heder and yeshiva, and was a member of Tzeiri Zion and HeHalutz during his youth. In 1920 he emigrated to Mandatory Palestine, where he was amongst the founders of the Histadrut trade union. He became a member of kibbutz Degania Bet and worked in road construction.

He helped establish the Office of Public Works, which later became Solel Boneh, and was one of its managers. In 1933 he became a member of the Histadrut's executive committee, and was responsible for its economics department. He also served as an economic advisor to the Histadrut leadership.

In 1949 he was elected to the first Knesset on Mapai's list. However, he resigned his seat on 5 February 1951, and was replaced by Jenia Tversky. In 1953 he established the Economics Quarterly journal, and edited it until 1974, the year in which he died.

He published two books, Economic Preparedness in 1943, and Immigration and Development on the way to the State in 1971.
