= Aryeh Sheftel =

Israeli politician (1905-1980)

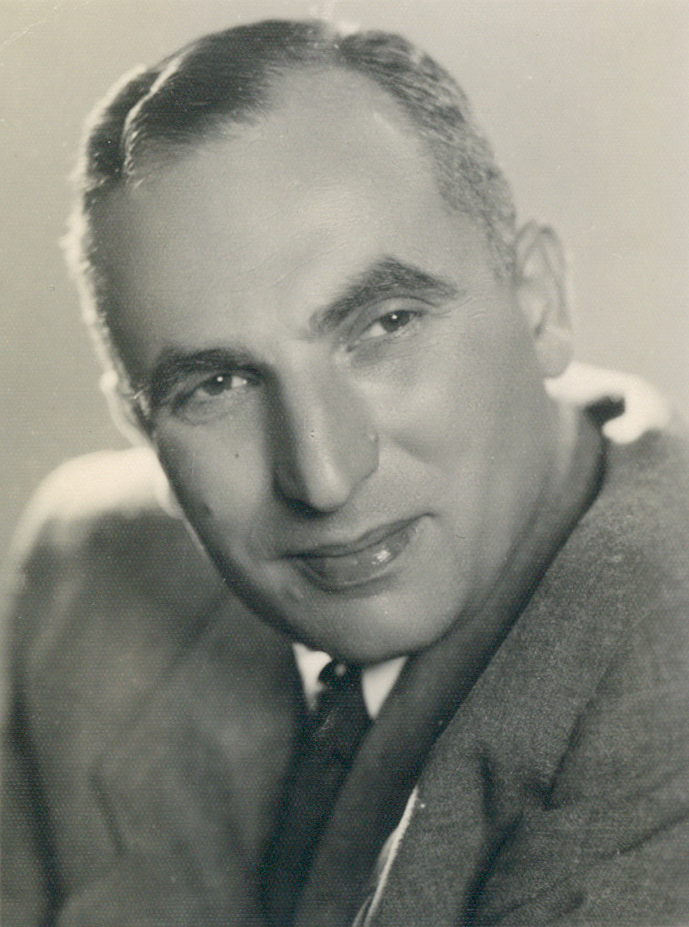
- Sheftel during his time in the Knesset

Faction represented in the Knesset
- 1949–1951: Mapai

Personal details
- Born: 1905 Vilnius, Russian Empire
- Died: 28 September 1980 (aged 74–75)

Aryeh Sheftel (Hebrew: אריה שפטל; 1905 – 28 September 1980) was an Israeli politician who served as a member of the Knesset and mayor of Rishon LeZion.

== Biography ==
Born in Vilnius in the Russian Empire, Sheftel was educated in a heder, yeshiva and high school in his home city, before attending a Teachers Seminary, after which he worked as a teacher in the Tarbut school system in Vilnius. In 1921 he joined the Borochov Zionist Youth Movement, and was also a member of HeHalutz. In 1925, he joined Poale Zion. During the Nazi occupation, he continued to work as a teacher in the Vilna Ghetto. In 1943 he was involved in organising an uprising in the Ghetto. He was later moved to concentrations camps in Estonia and other countries.

After World War II ended he was involved in helping organise Jews in Poland and edited a Yiddish language newspaper between 1946 and 1947. In 1947 he emigrated to Mandatory Palestine. In 1949 he was elected to the first Knesset. However, he resigned from it on 12 February 1951 and was replaced by Yisrael Yeshayahu. He was also secretary of the Rishon LeZion Workers Council and mayor of the city for three separate terms; 1951, 1960 to 1962 and 1965 until 1969.

He died in 1980.
