= Beba Idelson =

Israeli politician (1895–1975)

- בבה אידלסון
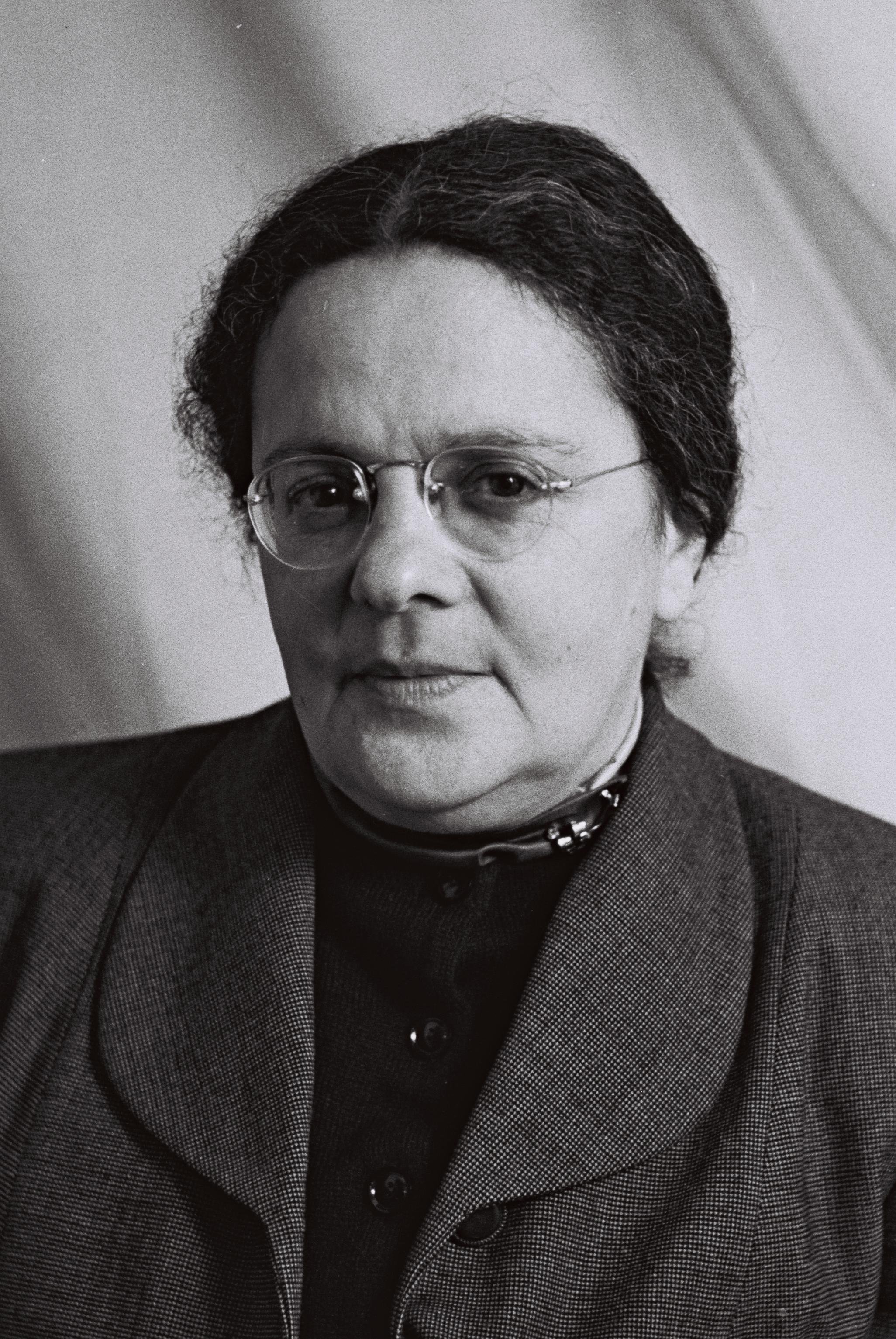

Faction represented in the Knesset
- 1949–1965: Mapai

Personal details
- Born: 14 October 1895 Ekaterinoslav, Russian Empire
- Died: 5 December 1975 (aged 80) Tel Aviv, Israel

Beba Idelson (Hebrew: בבה אידלסון; 14 October 1895 – 5 December 1975) was a Zionist activist and Israeli politician.

== Biography ==
Beba Idelson (née Trakhtenbereg) was born in Ekaterinoslav in the Russian Empire (now Dnipro, Ukraine) in 1895. When she was eight, her mother died giving birth to her thirteenth child and at the age of fourteen she lost her father, Yitzhak. Along with her grandmother and brother, she helped to support the family. In 1912, she graduated from high school, and went on to study Economics and Social Sciences at the Kharkiv University. In 1913, shaken by the Beilis trial, she became interested in Zionism and in 1915 she joined the “Youth of Zion” (later to be merged into Hashomer Hatzair). In 1917, she joined the Zionist Socialist Party and married Yisrael Idelson (later Yisrael Bar-Yehuda), a senior party member. For their Zionist activism, they were banished to Siberia. That year she also gave birth to the couple's only daughter, Rebecca. In 1924, thanks to an intercession by Maxim Gorki's wife, their banishment was converted to deportation to Mandatory Palestine.

== Zionist and political activism ==
Between 1924 and 1926, Idelson was active in the World Union of Socialist Zionists in Europe, and in 1926 they immigrated to the British Mandate of Palestine. Yisrael worked for the party and became secretary of the workers of Petah Tikva while Beba worked in agriculture. She later divorced Idelson and married Haim Halperin. From 1927 to 1928 she worked as a statistician for the World Zionist Organization and then joined the Ahdut HaAvoda party. In 1930 she became secretary of the “Council of Working Women” and led several women's organizations. She was a delegate to the Jewish National Council and contacted many socialist leaders, arguably including Leon Trotsky in Mexico in October 1937.

During World War II Idelson and Hadassah Samuel from the Women's International Zionist Organization were the prime movers behind the volunteering of Jewish women from the Yishuv to the British army. A total of 3,200 women served in the Auxiliary Territorial Service, and 789 in the Women's Auxiliary Air Force.

== Political career ==
After the State of Israel was established in 1948, Idelson was a member of the Provisional State Council and headed the Flag and Emblem Committee, which chose the Emblem of Israel.

In 1949-1965, Idelson was elected to the first five Knessets for Mapai. She was the first woman to serve as a member of the Foreign Affairs and Defense Committee and was a member also of the Constitution, Law and Justice, Housing and wasand Labor Committees. She promoted social reforms and women's equality and opposed the religious coercion. She also supported applying the mandatory draft to the IDF to women as well as men. In 1960, she was chairwoman of the Histadrut's ninth Committee and was its member until 1965. From 1968 to 1975, Idelson was chairwoman of the World Movement of Pioneer Women. She retired from the Council of Working Women in 1974 and died in 1975.

== See also ==
- Women in Israel
