= Yosef Fischer =

Israeli politician (1920–1992)

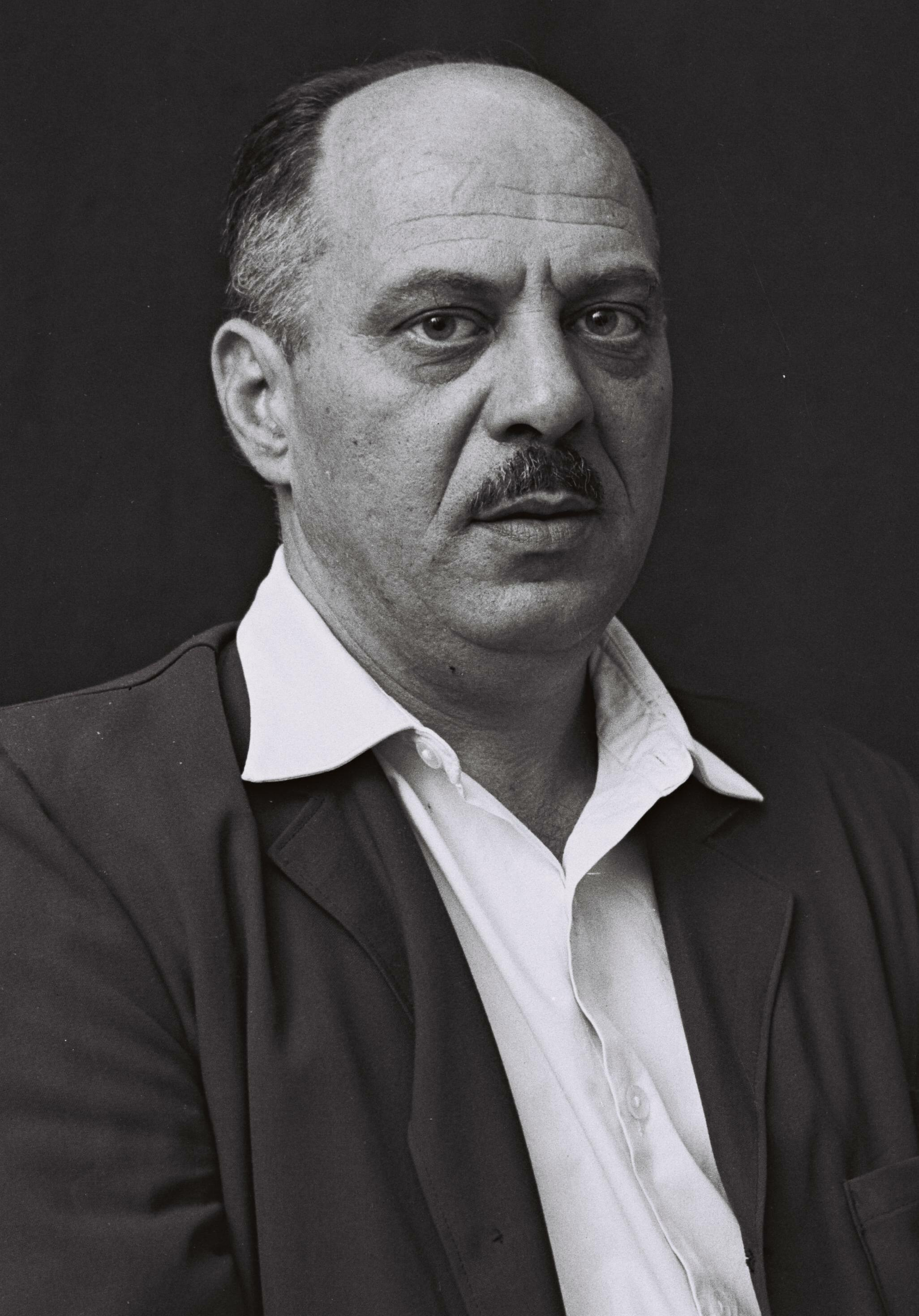
- Fischer in 1959

Faction represented in the Knesset
- 1959–1965: Mapai
- 1965–1968: Alignment
- 1968–1969: Labor Party
- 1969: Alignment

Personal details
- Born: 11 February 1920 Budapest, Hungary
- Died: 14 December 1992 (aged 72)

Yosef Fischer (Hebrew: יוסף פישר; 11 February 1920 – 14 December 1992) was an Israeli politician who served as a member of the Knesset for Mapai and its successors between 1959 and 1969.

== Biography ==
Born in Budapest in Hungary, Fischer emigrated to Mandatory Palestine in 1935. Between 1938 and 1940 he served in the British Army as a Haganah emissary, before working as a cadet in the Jewish Settlement Police in Hanita and the Haifa Bay area from 1940 until 1943.

A Haganah instructor, he was commander of the Kfar Azar training camp in 1947. Between 1947 and 1949 he worked as a manager, before establishing a machine shop in 1949 and becoming active in the Small Industries Association.

In 1952 he joined Mapai and was elected to the Knesset on the party's list in 1959. He was re-elected in 1961 and 1965, before losing his seat in the 1969 elections.

He died in 1992 at the age of 72 after being hit by a scooter.
