= Jenia Tversky =

Israeli politician (1904–1964)

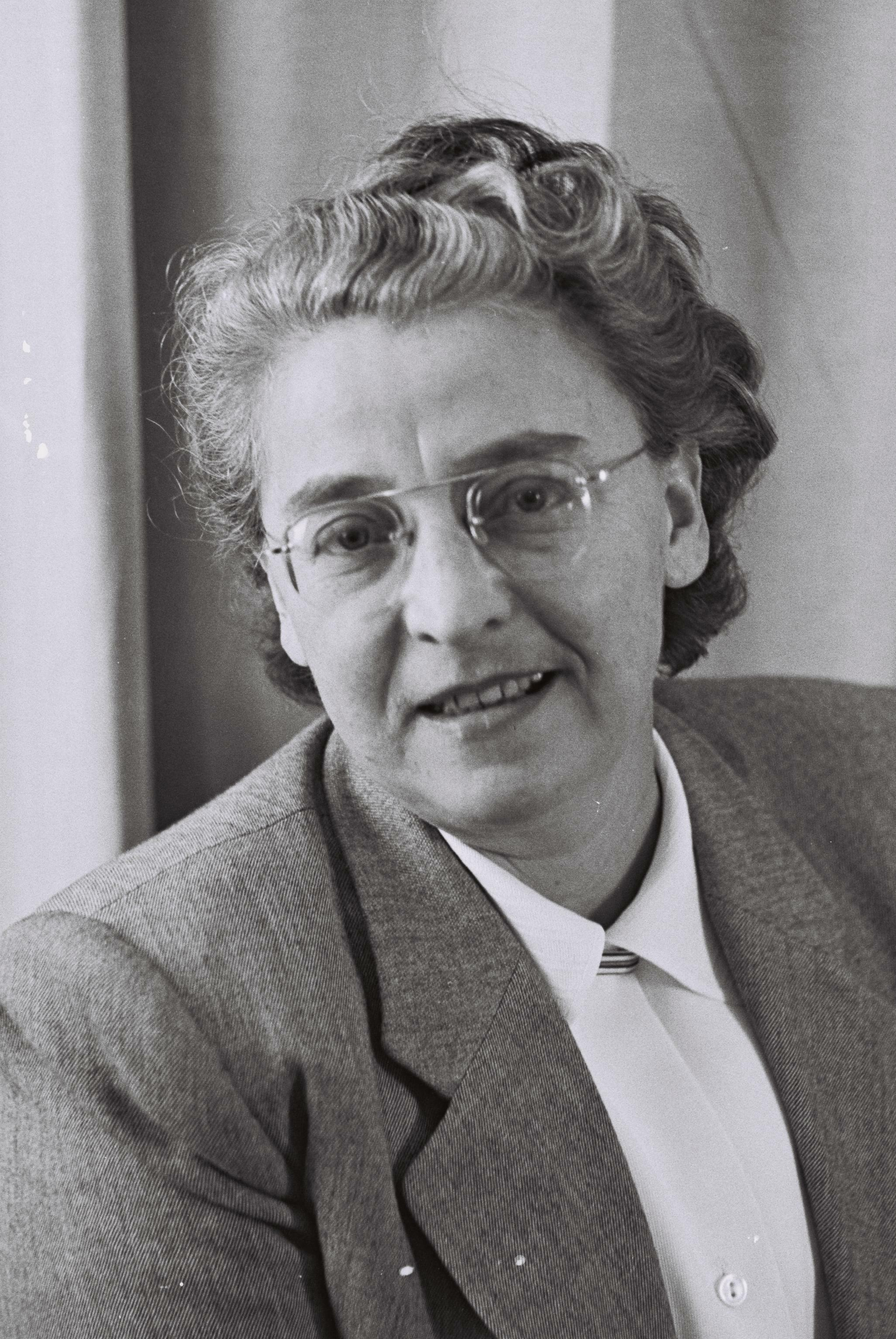
- Tversky in 1951

Faction represented in the Knesset
- 1951–1955: Mapai
- 1959–1961: Mapai
- 1963–1964: Mapai

Personal details
- Born: 16 August 1904 Baranovichi, Russian Empire
- Died: 9 April 1964 (aged 59)

Jenia Tversky (Hebrew: זֶ׳נִיָה טְבֶרְסְקִי; 16 August 1904 – 9 April 1964) was an Israeli politician who served as a member of the Knesset for Mapai.

== Biography ==
Born Genia Gintsburg (Russian: Геня Гинцбург) in 1904 in Baranovichi in the Russian Empire (now in Belarus), Tversky studied at the University of Warsaw and at a Social Work school in Berlin. In 1923, she made aliyah to Mandatory Palestine, where she became a pioneer of social services. Between 1932 and 1942 she served as director of the Jewish community's social services in Haifa, before working as head of the Social Services Department of the Neighbourhood Committee of Jerusalem between 1942 and 1948. She was also a member of the Executive Committee of the Histadrut trade union, and was sent to the Holocaust survivors' camps as an emissary in 1945.

A member of Mapai, she was 53rd on the party's list for the 1949 Knesset elections, but missed out on a seat when the party won 46 seats. However, she entered the Knesset on 5 February 1951 as a replacement for Heshel Frumkin. She was placed 37th on the Mapai list for the July 1951 elections, retaining her seat as the party won 45 seats.

After being placed 49th on the party's list for the 1955 elections, she lost her seat when Mapai won only 40 seats. However, she returned to the Knesset on 6 July 1959 as a replacement for Shlomo Hillel. Placed 47th on the Mapai list for the November 1959 elections, she was re-elected as Mapai won 47 seats. She moved up to 46th place on the party list for the 1961 elections, but left the Knesset as the party won only 42 seats. However, she re-entered the Knesset again on 24 November 1963 after the death of Meir Argov. She died on 6 April the following year, and was replaced by Aharon Yadlin. A street in Haifa is named after her.

She married a Polish Jew, Josef Tversky - a veterinarian. Her son was the psychologist Amos Tversky (1937–1996), co-author (with Daniel Kahneman) of prospect theory.
