= Yitzhak Golan =

Israeli politician (1912–1991)

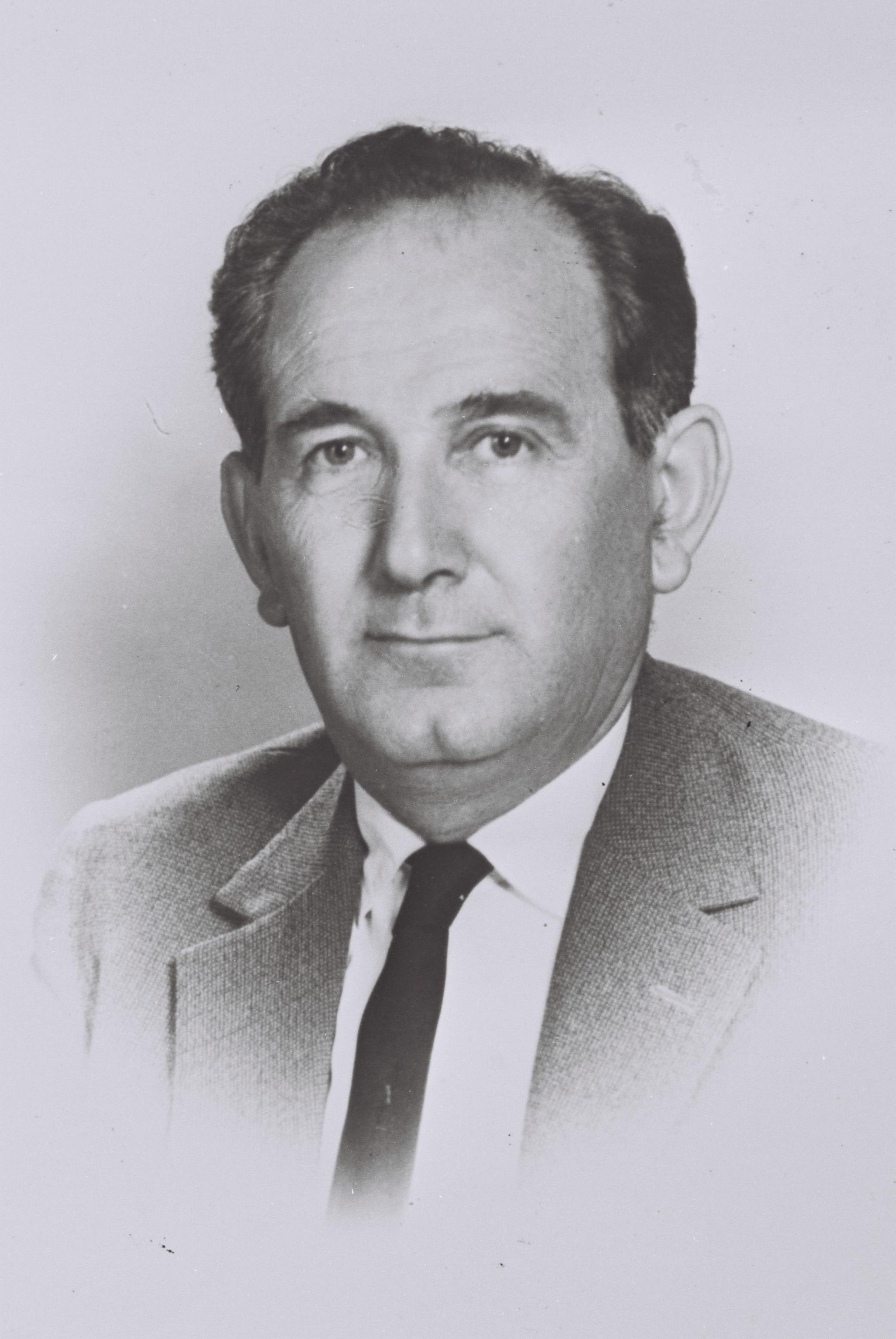
- Golan in 1969

Faction represented in the Knesset
- 1959–1961: Progressive Party
- 1961–1965: Liberal Party
- 1965: Independent Liberals
- 1966–1974: Independent Liberals
- 1974–1977: Independent Liberals

Personal details
- Born: 27 August 1912 Khodoriv, Austria-Hungary
- Died: 14 October 1991 (aged 79)

Yitzhak Golan (Hebrew: יצחק גולן; 27 August 1912 – 14 October 1991) was an Israeli politician who served as a member of the Knesset for the Progressive Party and its successors in three spells between 1959 and 1977.

== Life and politics ==
Born Yitzhak Goldstein in Khodoriv in Austria-Hungary (now in Ukraine), Golan was educated at a Hebrew high school, before studying law at university for two years. During his youth he joined HaNoar HaTzioni, and was amongst its leadership. He later became a member of the Zionist Federation's national council in East Galicia.

He emigrated to Mandatory Palestine in 1936, and was amongst the founders of kibbutz Usha the following year. In 1943 he became a member of HaOved HaTzioni's executive and organising committees, and from 1944 until 1960 was a member of HaMerkaz HaHakla'i.

Golan joined the Progressive Party, and from 1949 until 1960 was a member of its central committee, directorate and secretariat. He was elected to the Knesset on the party's list in 1959. When it merged with the General Zionists to form the Liberal Party in 1961 he became a member of the new party's central institutions, and was re-elected on its list in the elections that year. When most former Progressive Party members left to form the Independent Liberals in 1965, Golan went with them.

Although he lost his seat in the 1965 elections, he returned to the Knesset on 11 January 1966 as a replacement for Moshe Kol, who had vacated his seat after being appointed Minister of Tourism and Minister of Development. Golan retained his seat in the 1969 elections, but lost it again in the 1973 elections. However, he returned to the Knesset again as a replacement for Gideon Hausner on 10 March 1974, after Hausner had been appointed a Minister without Portfolio. He lost his seat for the final time in the 1977 elections.

Golan died in 1991 at the age of 79.
