= Ami Assaf =

Israeli politician (1903–1963)

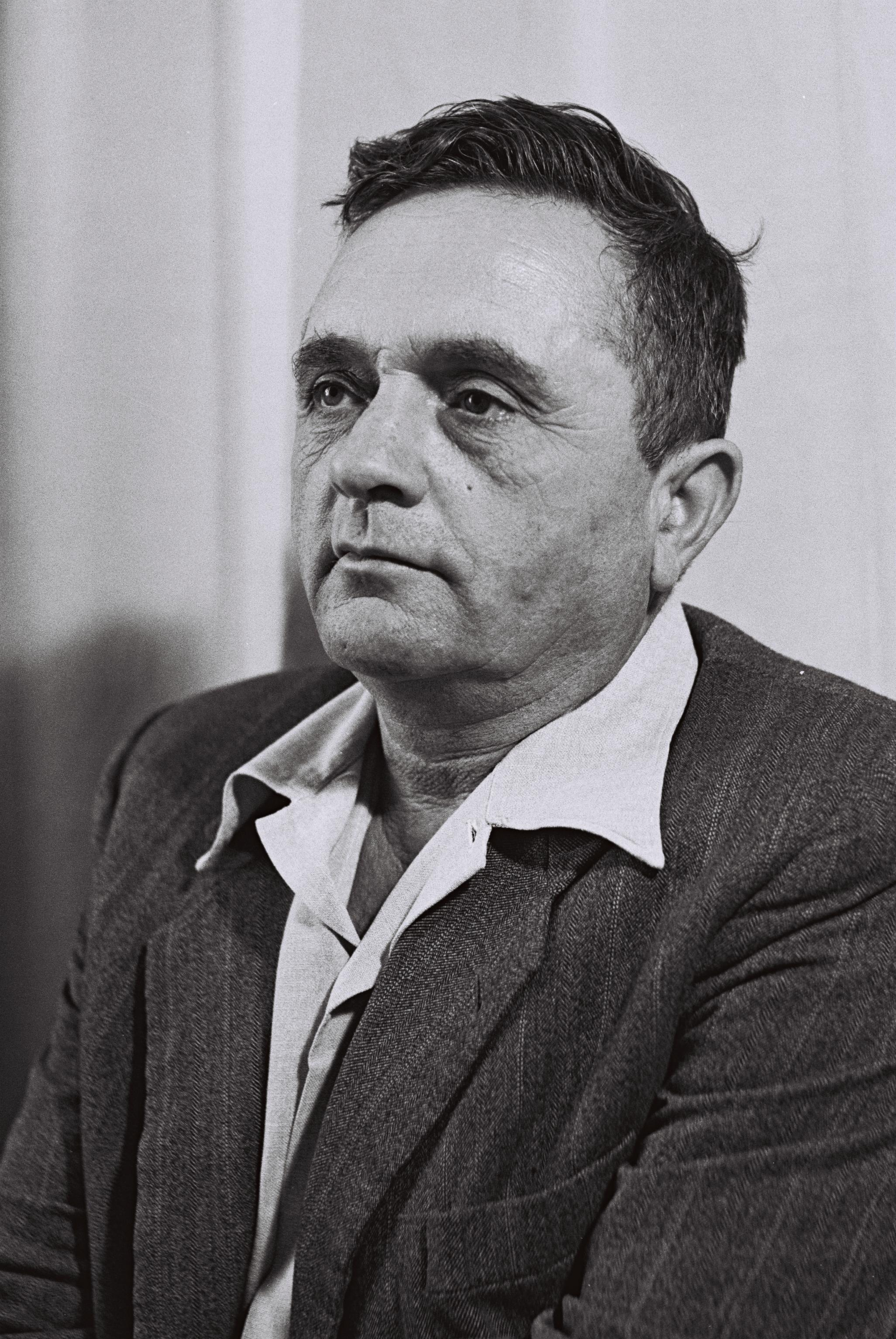
- Assaf in 1959

Faction represented in the Knesset
- 1949–1961: Mapai

Personal details
- Born: 22 July 1903 Rosh Pinna, Ottoman Empire
- Died: 17 May 1963 (aged 59)

Ami Assaf (Hebrew: עַמִּי אָסָף; 22 July 1903 – 17 May 1963) was an Israeli politician who served as a member of the Knesset for Mapai from 1949 until 1961.

== Biography ==
Born Ami Vilkomitz in Rosh Pinna, Assaf attended the Herzliya Gymnasium. After finishing school, he worked in agriculture. One of the founders of the Kfar Yehoshua moshav, in 1936 he became secretary of the Moshavim Movement, and was a member of Mapai's central committee.

In 1949 he was elected to the first Knesset on Mapai's list. He was re-elected in 1951, 1955 and 1959. On 28 December 1959 he was appointed Deputy Minister of Education and Culture. After re-election in 1961 he reprised the role, holding it until his death in 1963. Upon his death, his seat was taken by Mordechai Zar.
