= Mordechai Zar =

Israeli politician (1914–1982)

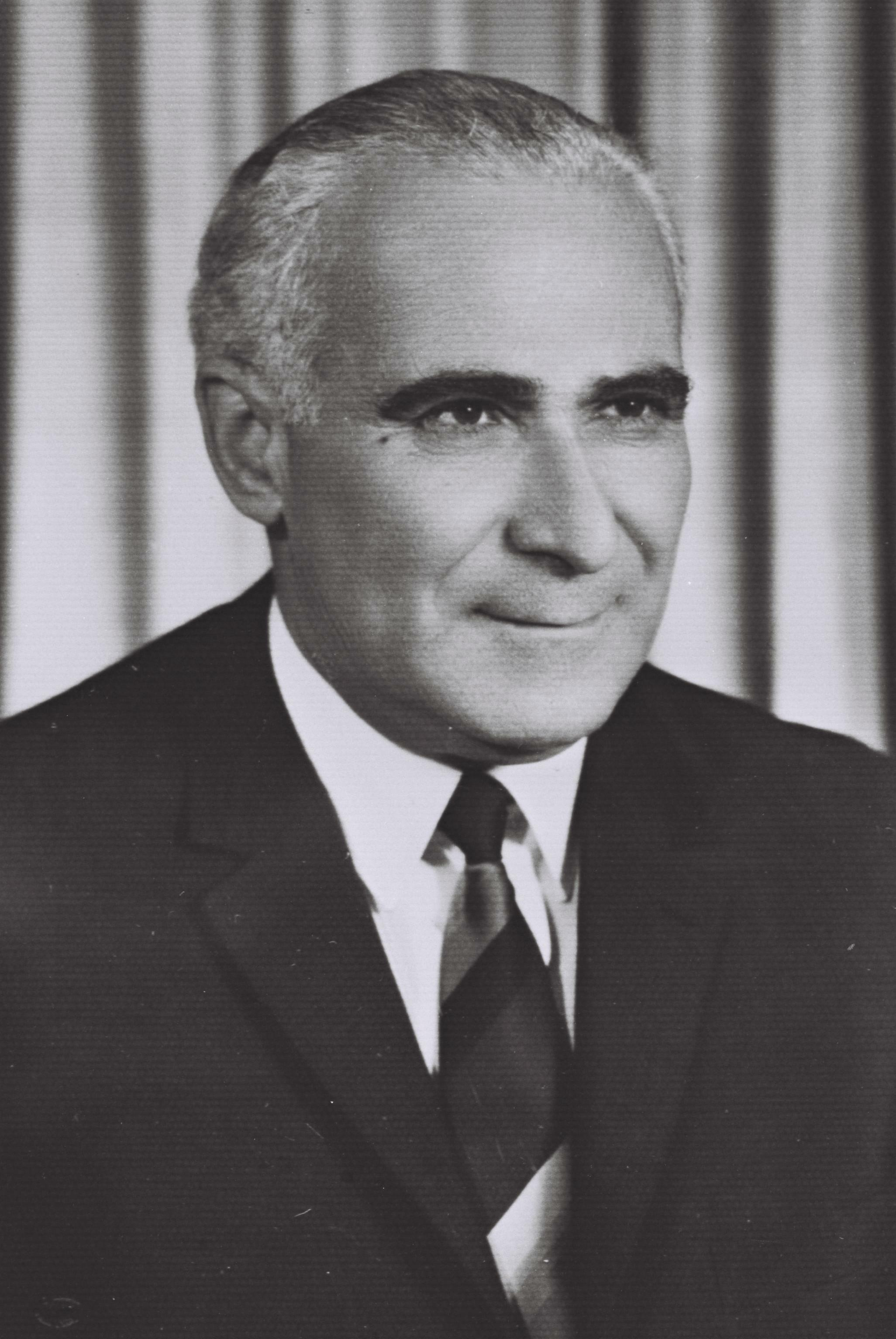
- Zar in 1969

Faction represented in the Knesset
- 1959–1961: Mapai
- 1963–1965: Mapai
- 1965–1968: Alignment
- 1968–1969: Labor Party
- 1969–1974: Alignment

Personal details
- Born: 14 January 1914 Mashhad, Persia
- Died: 15 November 1982 (aged 68)

Mordechai Zar (Hebrew: מרדכי זר; Persian: مُردِخای زر; 14 January 1914 – 15 November 1982) was an Israeli politician who served as a member of the Knesset for Mapai and its successors between 1959 and 1974.

== Biography ==
Zar was born in Mashhad, Iran to Persian Jewish parents. He emigrated to Mandatory Palestine in 1935. He worked in construction and road paving, before starting work for the Employment Bureau in 1942. In 1946 he became director of the Mizrachi Jew department of the Histadrut trade union. He also served as a member of Jerusalem Workers Council, and was director of its Culture Department. In addition, Zar was president of the Association of Iranian Jewish Immigrants, and chairman of the Jerusalem branch of the Sephardi Jewish Committee.

In 1955 he was elected to Jerusalem City Council, on which he served until 1965. In 1959 he was elected to the Knesset on the Mapai list. Although he lost his seat in the 1961 elections, he returned to the Knesset on 17 May 1963 as a replacement for the deceased Ami Assaf. He retained his seat in elections in 1965 and 1969 (by which time Mapai was part of the Alignment alliance), before losing it in the 1973 elections.

Zar died in 1982 at the age of 68. A street in the Pisgat Ze'ev neighbourhood in Jerusalem is named after him.
