= Shmuel Shoresh =

Israeli politician (1913–1981)

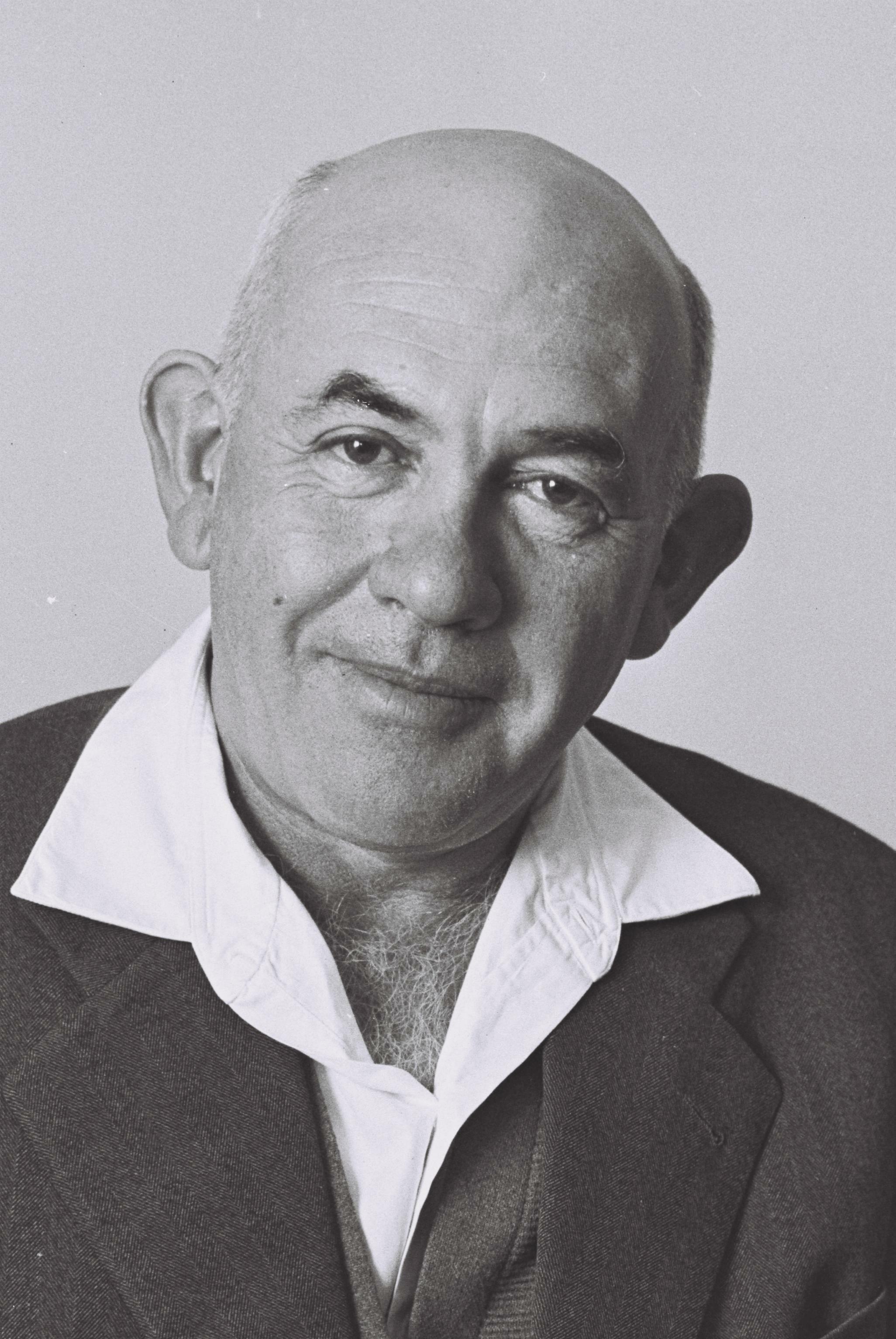
- Shoresh in the 1970s

Faction represented in the Knesset
- 1955–1965: Mapai
- 1965–1968: Alignment
- 1968–1969: Labor Party
- 1969: Alignment

Personal details
- Born: 11 January 1913 Rivne, Russian Empire
- Died: 13 November 1981 (aged 68)

Shmuel Shoresh (Hebrew: שמואל שורש; 11 January 1913 – 13 November 1981) was an Israeli politician who served as a member of the Knesset from 1955 until 1969.

== Biography ==
Born in Rivne in the Russian Empire, Shoresh emigrated to Mandatory Palestine in 1924 and settled in Balfouria. He attended the Hebrew Reali School in Haifa. In 1927 he joined HaNoar HaOved, and in 1934 became a representative of HaMerkaz HaHakla'i in Magdiel. Two years later he was amongst the founders of moshav Beit She'arim (moshav). In 1945 he became chairman of Kishon and Nahalal Joint Regional Council, and in 1948 joined the secretariat of the Moshavim Movement. He was also a member of the Haganah.

In 1953 he was appointed director of the Ministry of Agriculture's Economic Department. Two years later he was elected to the Knesset on the Mapai list. He was re-elected in 1959, 1961 and 1965, by which time Mapai had formed the Alignment alliance. He lost his seat in the 1969 elections.

He died in 1981 at the age of 68.
