= Benno Cohen =

Israeli politician

- Cohen testifying at the Eichmann trial in 1961

Faction represented in the Knesset
- 1961–1965: Liberal Party
- 1965: Independent Liberals

Personal details
- Born: 30 September 1894 Germany
- Died: 24 November 1975 (aged 81)

Benno Cohen (Hebrew: בנו כהן; 30 September 1894 – 24 November 1975) was an Israeli politician who served as a member of the Knesset for the Liberal Party and the Independent Liberals between 1961 and 1965.

== Biography ==
Born in Germany, Cohen was amongst the leadership of the Blue-White youth movement. He studied at the University of Breslau, where he was a member of the Zionist Students Association, and was certified as a lawyer. He also served in the German Army during World War I.

During the 1920s he spent time in Mandatory Palestine working on plans for agricultural settlements. Between 1933 and 1939 he served as general secretary of the German branch of the Zionist Movement. He was arrested by the Gestapo in September 1936.

In 1939 Cohen emigrated to Palestine. He was amongst the founders of the New Aliyah Party, which later merged into the Progressive Party. He served as chairman of the Disciplinary Court for civil servants, and also worked as a lecturer at the School for Jurisprudence and Economics in Tel Aviv. In 1961, he was elected to the Knesset on the Liberal Party list (which had been formed by a merger of the Progressive Party and the General Zionists). In 1965, Cohen was amongst the group of former Progressive Party members that broke away to form the Independent Liberals, before losing his seat in elections later that year.

He died in 1975 at the age of 81.
