= Amos Degani =

Israeli politician (1926–2012)

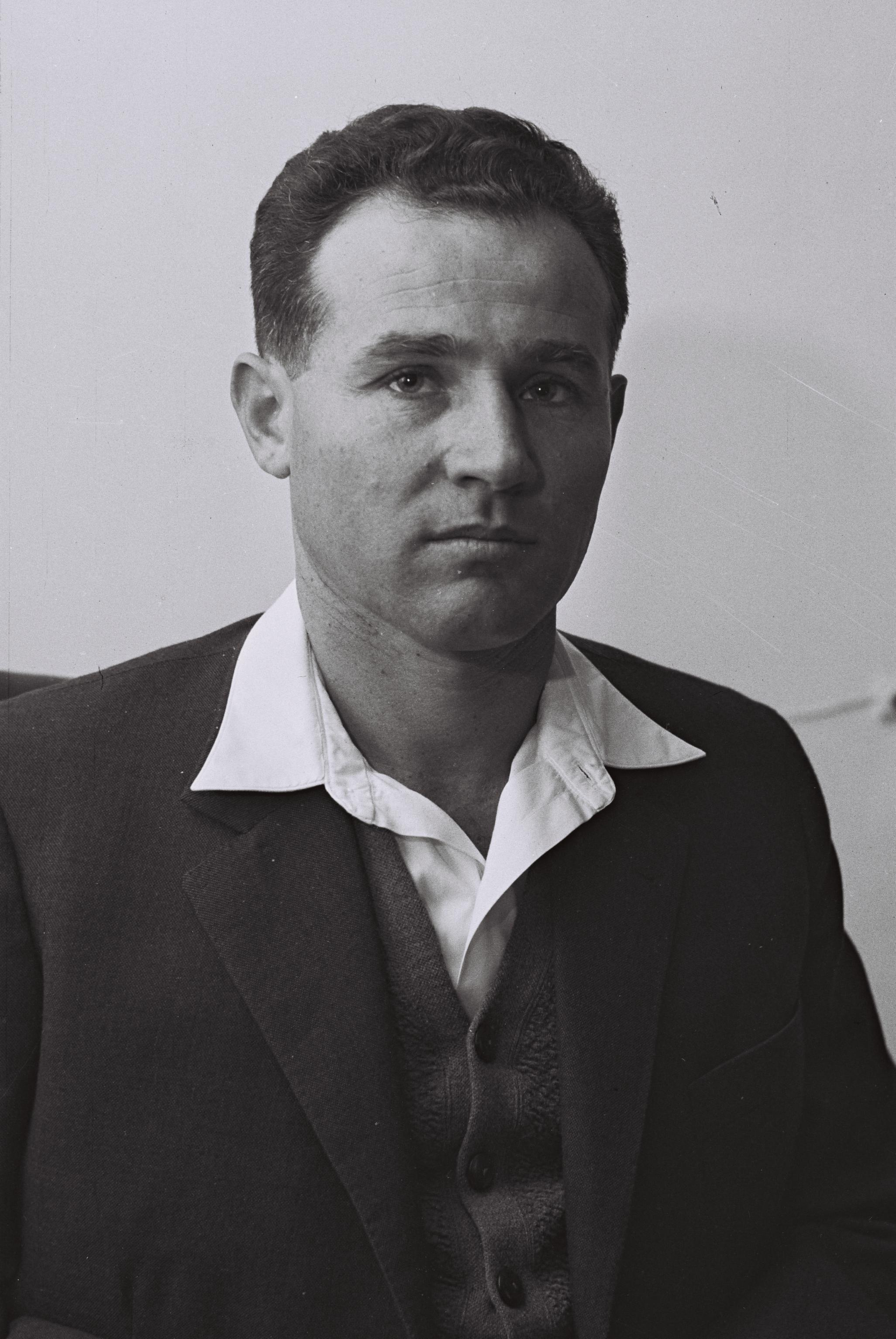
- Degani in 1959

Faction represented in the Knesset
- 1957–1965: Mapai
- 1965–1968: Rafi
- 1968–1969: Labor Party
- 1969: Alignment

Personal details
- Born: 23 May 1926; Tel Aviv, Mandatory Palestine
- Died: 29 July 2012 (aged 86); Kfar Vitkin, Israel

Amos Degani (Hebrew: עמוס דגני; 23 May 1926 – 29 July 2012) was an Israeli politician who served as a member of the Knesset between 1957 and 1969.

== Biography ==
Born in Tel Aviv during the Mandate era, Degani was a member of HaNoar HaOved during his youth, becoming a member of its secretariat in 1942. He studied public administration at the Hebrew University of Jerusalem.

Having been a co-ordinator for the Moshav Youth, he became a member of the Moshavim Movement's secretariat, and served as director of its Department of Youth Settlement and Security. He also worked as a trainer for immigrants in moshavim in the Negev desert.

He joined Mapai in 1944 and was a director of its youth leadership. He was on the party's list for the 1955 elections, and although he failed to win a seat, he entered the Knesset on 19 December 1957 as a replacement for Aharon Remez. He retained his seat in elections in 1959 and 1961. In July 1965 he was amongst the Mapai members that left the party to establish Rafi under the leadership of David Ben-Gurion. Although he lost his seat in the November 1965 elections, he returned to the Knesset on 8 December that year as a replacement for Tzvi Tzur, who resigned his seat shortly after the elections. He lost his seat again in the 1969 elections. As a Knesset member Degani supported the reduction of agricultural subsidies by saying that "a real farmer would not want to be a civil servant", but he asked not to increase agricultural imports by saying that "agricultural products are today exposed to quite a large extent to competition."

Degani was also a member of the Histadrut's co-ordinating committee, and was responsible for co-operatives in Hevrat Ovdim between 1970 and 1975.

Between 1975 and 1995 he served as head of Hefer Valley Regional Council.
