= Yisrael Bar-Yehuda =

Israeli politician (1895–1965)

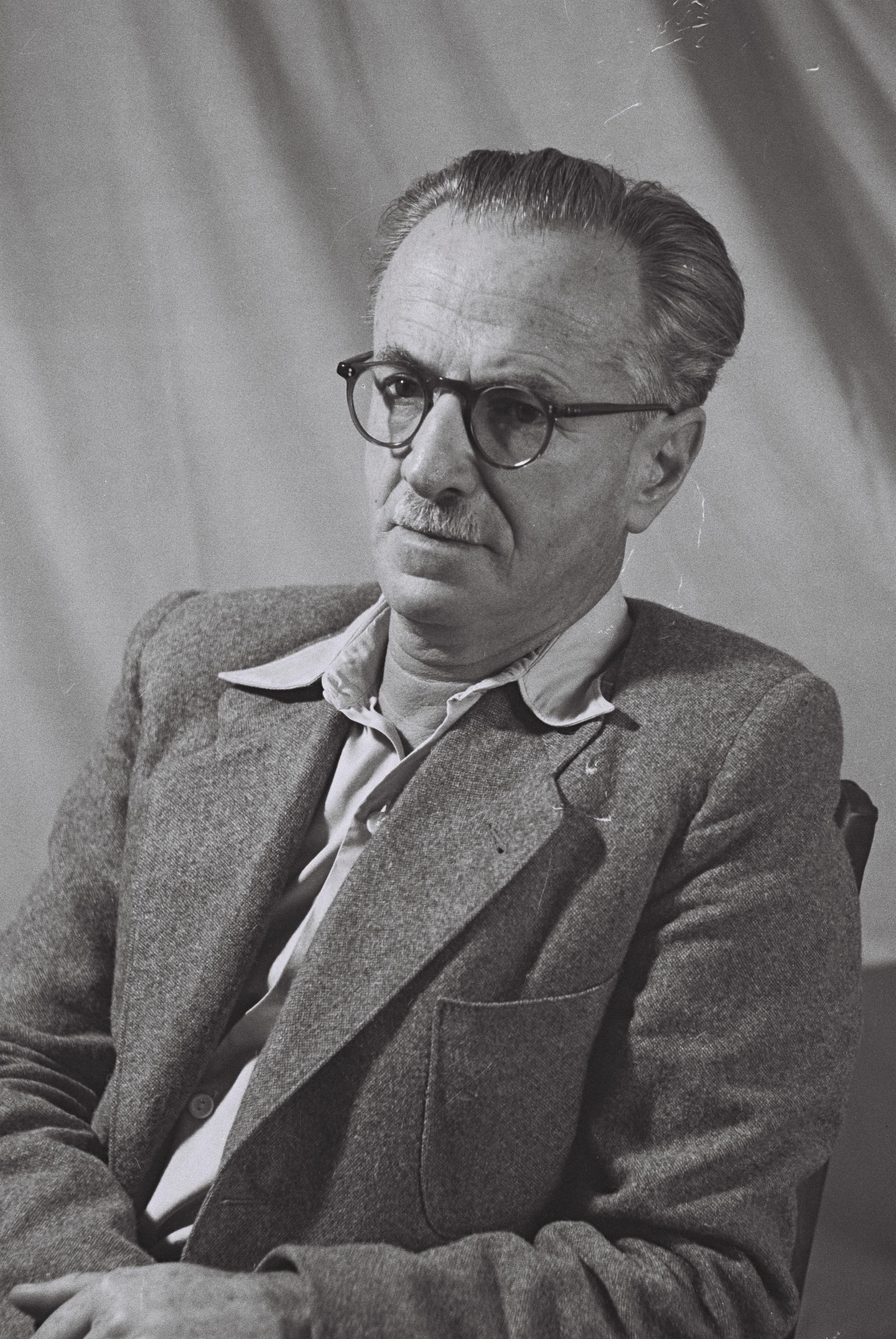

Ministerial roles
- 1955–1959: Minister of Internal Affairs
- 1962–1965: Minister of Transportation

Faction represented in the Knesset
- 1949–1954: Mapam
- 1954–1965: Ahdut HaAvoda

Personal details
- Born: 15 November 1895 Konotop, Russian Empire
- Died: 4 May 1965 (aged 69) Yagur, Israel

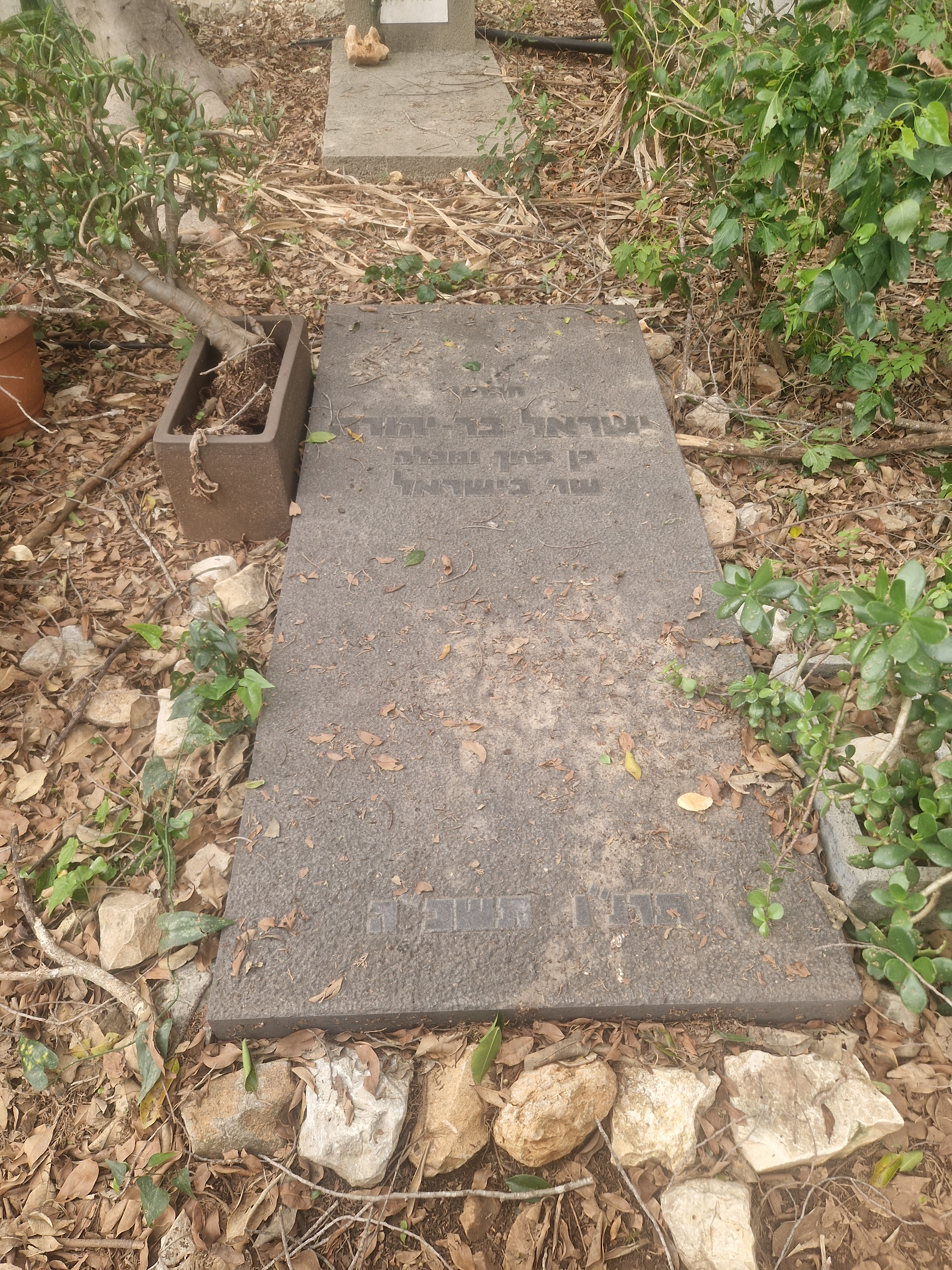
The grave of Yisrael Bar-Yehuda in the cemetery at Kibbutz Yagur

Yisrael Bar-Yehuda (Hebrew: יִשְׂרָאֵל בַּר-יְהוּדָה; 15 November 1895 – 15 May 1965) was a Zionist activist and Israeli politician.

== Biography ==
Born Yisrael Idelson in Konotop, in the Chernigov Governorate of the Russian Empire (present-day Sumy Oblast, Ukraine) in 1895, Bar-Yehuda attended an Academic High School and the Mine Engineering Institute in Ekaterinoslav. During that time he was the mathematics tutor of the future Lubavitcher Rebbe, when the latter was 17 years old. In 1909 he joined Tze'irei Zion (later to be merged into Hashomer Hatzair) and was made a member of its central committee in Russia in 1917. He was Secretary of the Central Committee of the "Socialist Zionists", where he met and married Beba Idelson (whom he would later divorce). In 1922 they were arrested by the Soviet authorities and exiled to Siberia. In 1924, thanks to an intercession by Maxim Gorki's wife, their banishment was converted to deportation to Mandate Palestine. They traveled to Lithuania and from there to Berlin by way of Danzig. For the next two years in Berlin they were active in establishing the World Union of Socialist Zionists and became the Movement's Secretary.

In 1926 he emigrated to Palestine. He was Secretary of the Petah Tikva Workers Council and organized sentries to protect Jewish workers. He also did roadwork on the Tel Aviv-Petah Tikva road. In 1930 he joined kibbutz Yagur, and became its secretary six years later. During the 1936-39 Arab revolt he was among the first to call for "active defense".

He was a delegate to the Assembly of Representatives and a member of the Constituent Assembly. He was one of the leaders of the "B" faction in Mapai and one of the leaders of the Ahdut HaAvoda after the split in 1944. From 1960 to 1962 he was secretary general of Ahdut HaAvoda.

He was elected to the first and second Knessets for Mapam and for Ahdut HaAvoda to the third through fifth. He was a member of the House, Constitution, Law and Justice, Foreign Affairs & Defense, Constitution, Law and Justice, Labor, and Finance Committees, as well as Chairman of the Subcommittee for Basic Laws. Bar-Yehuda was also Deputy Speaker of the third Knesset. He was Minister of Internal Affairs from 1955 to 1962 and then Minister of Transportation until his death in 1965.

The "Bar-Yehuda" neighborhood in Petah Tikva is named after him as well as Bar Yehuda Airfield and the road from Yagur to the Krayot intersection.
