= Meir Argov =

Israeli politician

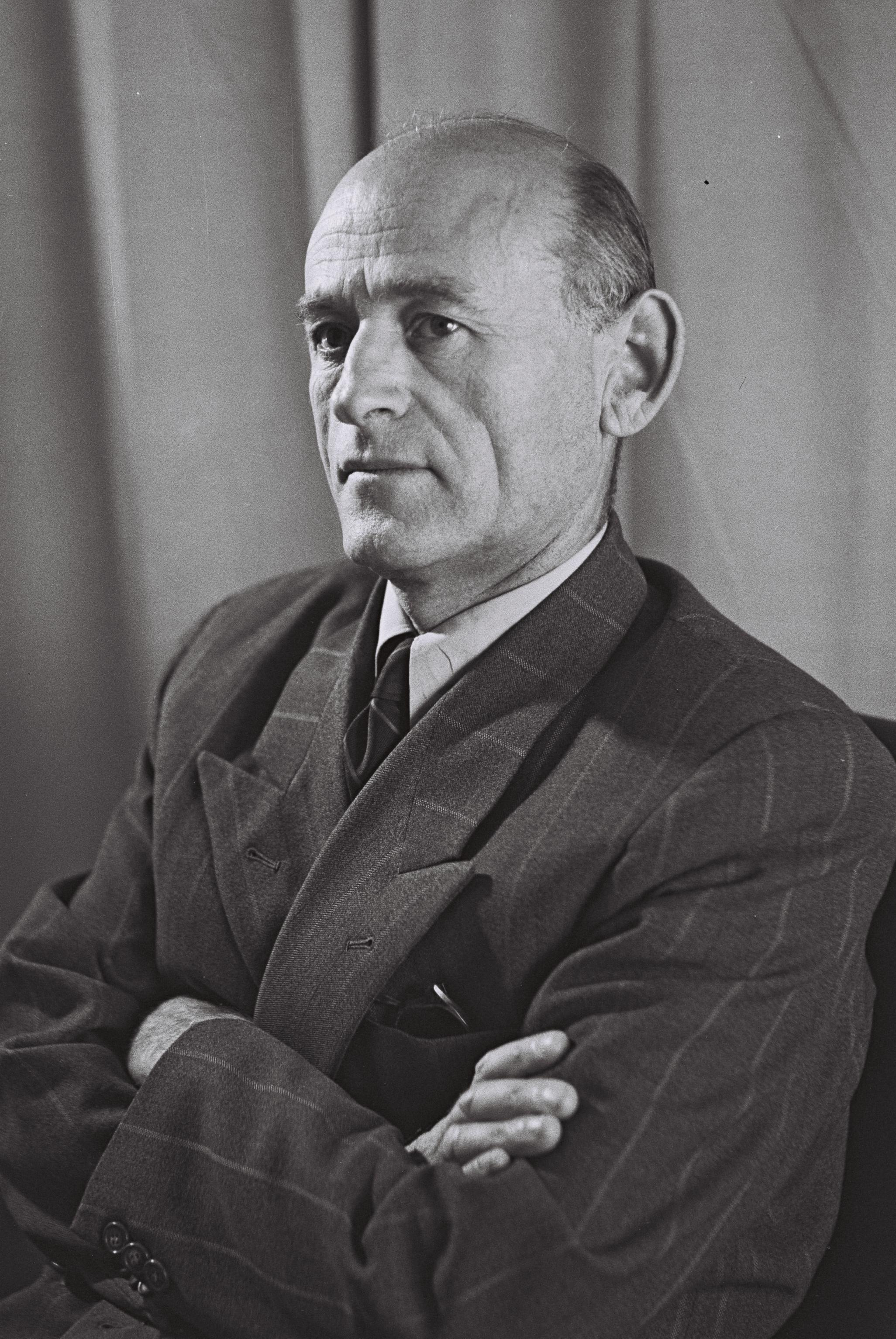
- Argov in 1959

Faction represented in the Knesset
- 1949–1963: Mapai

Personal details
- Born: 1905 Rîbnița, Russian Empire
- Died: 24 November 1963 (aged 57–58)

Meir Argov (Hebrew: מאיר ארגוב; 1905 – 24 November 1963) was a Zionist activist, Israeli politician and a signatory of the Israeli declaration of independence.

== Biography ==
Born Meyer Grabovsky in Rîbnița in the Russian Empire (today in Transnistria, Moldova), Argov studied at a heder and then at Kiev University. He became involved in Zionist activism in his youth, heading the HeHalutz movement in Ukraine, and becoming a member of the Tzeiri Zion central committee in 1917. He was arrested for Zionist activities in 1922, and again in 1924, after which he was expelled from the Soviet Union.

In 1927 he immigrated to Mandate Palestine and worked in agriculture. A secretary of the Petah Tikva Workers council between 1929 and 1939, he became a member of the Jewish National Council in 1930 and was elected onto Petah Tikva's municipal council in 1931. In 1940 he volunteered for the British Army and fought in the Jewish Brigade in Italy.

Argov (still under the name Grabovsky) was one of the signatories of Israel's declaration of independence in 1948, and immediately joined the Provisional State Council, representing Mapai. He was elected to the first Knesset in 1949, and retained his seat in elections in 1951, 1955, 1959 and 1961, serving as chair of the important Foreign Affairs and Defense Committee from 1951 onwards. He died in office in 1963 and was buried in Segula Cemetery. His seat was taken by Jenia Tversky.
