= Talik Gvili =

- טליק גויאלי

Faction represented in the Knesset
- 2026–: Likud

Personal details
- Born: 14 May 1970 (age 56) Beersheba, Israel
- Education: Ono Academic College

Talik Gvili (Hebrew: טליק גויאלי) is an Israeli activist and politician currently serving as a member of the Knesset for Likud. Gvili is also the mother of former Israeli hostage Ran Gvili.

== Biography ==
Gvili worked as a family lawyer, and a lecturer on legal mediations.

Gvili's son, Ran, who served in a Special Police Unit, died in combat during the October 7 attacks, with his body being taken to the Gaza Strip. Following his abduction, Gvili closed her office to focus on camapaigning for her son's return, and was active in the Tikva Forum. Ran's body was returned to Israel 26 January 2026, making him the last hostage returned to Israel during the Gaza war.

In 2026, Gvili was selected to light a Beacon at Israel's annual Torch-lighting Ceremony.

On 8 September 2026, Gvili joined Likud and was assigned the 9th slot on its electoral list for the 2026 Knesset election by party leader Benjamin Netanyahu. She was elected to the Knesset as the party won 27 seats.

== Personal life ==
Gvili resides in Meitar. She is married and has three children, including Ran.
