= Independent Centre =

Independent Centre המרכז העצמאי
- Leader: Eliezer Shostak
- Founded: 1975
- Dissolved: 1976
- Split from: Free Centre
- Merged into: La'am
- Alliance: Likud
- Most MKs: 2 (1975–1976)
- Fewest MKs: 2 (1975–1976)

The Independent Centre (Hebrew: המרכז העצמאי, HaMerkaz HaAtzma'i) was a political faction in Israel between 1975 and 1976.

== History ==
The faction was established by Eliezer Shostak and Ehud Olmert after they broke away from the Free Centre, a member of the Likud alliance, in 1974. The founding conference of the new faction, which remained part of the Likud, was held in February 1975.

In 1976 the Independent Centre merged with two other Likud factions, National List and the Movement for Greater Israel, to form La'am, which became the third largest faction within Likud. It later formally merged with Herut, Likud's largest faction, in 1984. The Free Centre later broke away from Likud and joined the Democratic Movement for Change.
