= La'am =

Defunct Israeli political faction

La'am לע"ם
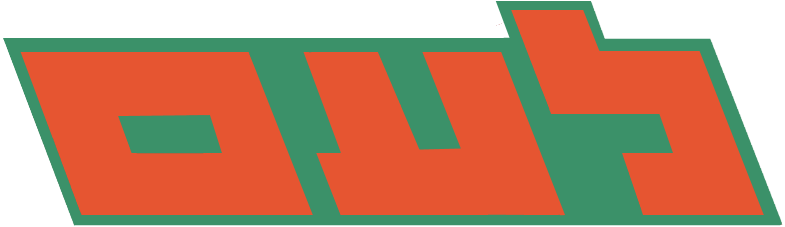
- Leader: Yigal Hurvitz; Eliezer Shostak
- Founded: 1976
- Dissolved: 1985
- Merger of: Independent Centre, the Movement for Greater Israel and the National List
- Merged into: Herut
- Alliance: Likud
- Colours: Green; Orange
- Most MKs: 8 (1976-1981)
- Fewest MKs: 3 (1982-1983)

La'am (Hebrew: לע"ם, lit. 'For the Nation', an abbreviation of Likud Avoda Mamlakhtit) was a political faction in Israel that formed part of Likud between 1976 and 1984.

== History ==
Between its formation in 1973 and formal merger in 1988, Likud consisted of an alliance of several right wing parties. The two largest blocs were Herut and the Liberal Party, which had formed the Gahal alliance between 1965 and 1973. In 1973 the two parties were joined by the Free Centre, the Independent Centre (a breakaway from the Free Centre), the National List and the Movement for Greater Israel.

In 1976, the latter three formed an alliance within the Likud bloc, named La'am, which consisted of eight of Likud's 39 seats. In the 1977 elections La'am remained at eight seats, with Likud growing to 43.

On 15 May 1979, Moshe Shamir, the Movement for Greater Israel representative, left Likud to sit as an independent, later establishing Tehiya with Geula Cohen. On 26 January 1981 three of its members, Yigal Hurvitz, Zalman Shoval and Yitzhak Peretz, left Likud to re-establish the National List as an independent party. Hurvitz and Shoval left to form Telem, whilst Peretz returned to Likud and La'am.

La'am was reduced to five seats from Likud's 48 in the June 1981 elections, following disputes within Likud about the number of seats allocated to each faction in which many Herut members felt the Liberal Party and La'am were over-represented. On 26 October 1982 it was reduced to three seats as Amnon Linn and Peretz defected to the Alignment. However, it gained an extra MK when Avraham Hirschson replaced Liberal faction member Simha Erlich. In 1985, as part of a move to consolidate Likud, La'am merged into Herut. Three years later the Liberal Party and Herut formally merged to leave Likud as a unitary party.

== Knesset members ==
Knesset	Members
8 (1976-1977); 8 seats	Yigal Cohen, Yigal Hurvitz, Amnon Linn, Ehud Olmert, Yitzhak Peretz, Eliezer Shostak, Zalman Shoval, Avraham Yafeh
9 (1977-1981); 8 seats	Yigal Cohen, Yigal Hurvitz, (Note: Left La'am and defected to other parties.) Amnon Linn, Ehud Olmert, Yitzhak Peretz, (Note: Left La'am, but later returned) Moshe Shamir, Eliezer Shostak, Zalman Shoval
10 (1981-1984); 5 seats	Yigal Cohen, Avraham Hirschson, (Note: Entered Knesset as a replacement for Liberal faction member.) Amnon Linn, Ehud Olmert, Yitzhak Peretz, Eliezer Shostak,
11 (1984-1985); 3 seats	Eliezer Shostak, Ehud Olmert, Yigal Cohen
