= Laam =

Laam or LAAM may refer to:

- Lââm, (born 1971), French female singer of Tunisian descent
- La'am, (Hebrew: לע"ם), a former political faction in Israel
- Lamane, the landed gentry as well the title of ancient kings of the Serer people
- Levacetylmethadol, a synthetic opioid similar in structure to methadone
- lām, a letter in the Arabic alphabet
- 3d LAAM Bn, a United States Marine Corps air defense unit
