= Greater Israel Movement =

Greater Israel Movement can refer to either of the following:

- Movement for Greater Israel - a political organisation in Israel during the 1960s and 1970s which subscribed to an ideology of Greater Israel.
- Greater Israel - an expression, with several different Biblical and political meanings over time. It is often used, in an irredentist fashion, to refer to the historic or desired borders of Israel.
