= Ehud Olmert =

Prime Minister of Israel from 2006 to 2009

- אֶהוּד אוֹלְמֶרְט
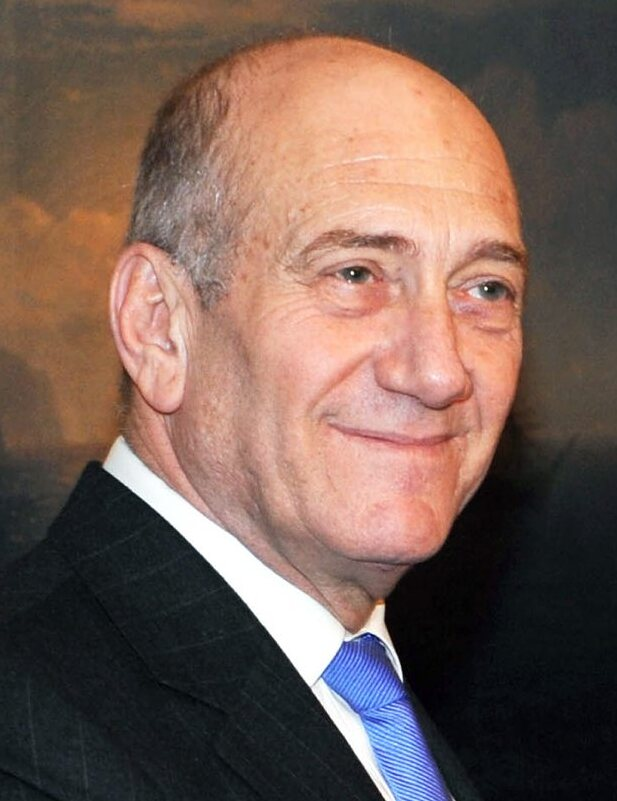
- Olmert in 2008

Prime Minister of Israel
- In office 4 January 2006 – 31 March 2009^{[nb]}
- President: Moshe Katsav; Shimon Peres
- Deputy: Tzipi Livni
- Preceded by: Ariel Sharon
- Succeeded by: Benjamin Netanyahu

Deputy Prime Minister of Israel
- In office 27 February 2003 – 14 April 2006
- Prime Minister: Ariel Sharon
- Preceded by: Yitzhak Mordechai; David Levy
- Succeeded by: Tzipi Livni

Mayor of Jerusalem
- In office 2 November 1993 – 16 February 2003
- Preceded by: Teddy Kollek
- Succeeded by: Uri Lupolianski

Ministerial roles
- 1988–1990: Without portfolio
- 1990–1992: Health
- 2003–2006: Industry, Trade and Labor
- 2003–2005: Communications
- 2005–2006: Finance
- 2006: Welfare

Faction represented in the Knesset
- 1973–1998: Likud
- 2003–2005: Likud
- 2005–2009: Kadima

Personal details
- Born: 30 September 1945 (age 81) Binyamina, Mandatory Palestine
- Party: Likud (1973–2006); Kadima (2006–2015)
- Spouse: Aliza Olmert
- Children: 4 (including Shaul and Dana)
- Education: Hebrew University of Jerusalem
- n.b. Acting: 4 January – 14 April 2006; Interim: 14 April – 4 May 2006

Ehud Olmert (/ˈoʊlmərt, -mɛərt/; Hebrew: אֶהוּד אוֹלְמֶרְט, IPA: [eˈhud ˈolmeʁt]; born 30 September 1945) is an Israeli politician and lawyer who served as the prime minister of Israel from 2006 to 2009.

The son of a former Herut politician, Olmert was first elected to the Knesset for Likud in 1973, at the age of 28. Olmert served as a minister without portfolio from 1988 to 1990, and as Minister of Health from 1990 until 1992. In 1993, he was elected Mayor of Jerusalem. He served two consecutive five-year terms before returning to national politics in 2003 to serve as Designated Acting Prime Minister, Minister of Trade and Minister of Communications. Olmert also served as acting Minister of Finance from 2005 to 2006, following the resignation of incumbent minister Benjamin Netanyahu.

In late 2005, Olmert joined Prime Minister Ariel Sharon in leaving Likud and forming Kadima alongside fellow Likud and Labor Party politicians. In January 2006, Olmert became the acting Prime Minister after Sharon was permanently incapacitated by a stroke. Olmert went on to succeed Sharon as Kadima leader, and formed a government following elections held that March. During Olmert's term, Israel fought the 2006 Lebanon War, which ended inconclusively. Olmert's approval dropped following the war, and he was harshly criticized for his handling of it by the Winograd Commission, whose findings prompted protests calling for his resignation. Olmert engaged in multiple rounds of peace talks with the Palestinians, including the 2007 Annapolis Conference, which ended following the breakout of the 2009 Gaza War.

Olmert resigned as prime minister in 2008 due to low approval ratings and a then-ongoing corruption probe. He remained in office until March 2009 and was succeeded by Benjamin Netanyahu. After leaving office, he was sentenced to six years in prison in 2014 for accepting bribes and for obstruction of justice during his terms as mayor of Jerusalem and as trade minister. He was released on parole in July 2017.

== Early life ==
Ehud Olmert was born in 1945 near Binyamina in the British Mandate of Palestine. According to Olmert, his parents, Bella Wagman and Mordechai Olmert, escaped persecution in Ukraine and Russia, and found sanctuary in Harbin, China. Olmert's paternal family settled in Harbin after fleeing Samara in 1919. His father Mordechai grew up in the city and was a member of its local Betar branch. He and Wagman immigrated to Mandatory Palestine from Harbin in 1933. Mordechai later became a politician and served as a member of the Knesset for Herut from 1955 to 1961. In 2004, Olmert visited China and paid his respects at the tomb of his grandfather in Harbin. Olmert said that his father had never forgotten his Chinese hometown after moving to Palestine. "When he died at the age of 88, he spoke his last words in Mandarin Chinese", he recalled.

Olmert graduated from the Hebrew University of Jerusalem with degrees in psychology, philosophy and law. He opened a successful law partnership in Jerusalem. Olmert served with the Israel Defense Forces in the Golani Brigade. While in service he was injured and temporarily released. He underwent many treatments, and later completed his military duties as a journalist for the IDF magazine BaMahane. During the Yom Kippur War, he joined the headquarters of Ariel Sharon as a military correspondent. Already a member of the Knesset, he decided to go through an officer's course in 1980 at the age of 35.

== Political career ==
In 1966, Olmert, then head of the Gahal (a predecessor to Likud) student group at the Hebrew University of Jerusalem, called for party leader Menachem Begin to step down during a party conference. Olmert was heckled by several attendees, but was applauded by Begin, who threatened to leave the conference if Olmert was not allowed to complete his speech. That year, Olmert left Herut and joined the breakaway party Free Centre. In 1969, he became Free Centre's Knesset Secretary.

Olmert was first elected to the Knesset in 1973 at the age of 28 as a member of Free Centre, now a faction within Likud. (Note: Olmert broke away from the Free Centre in 1974 and established the Independent Centre alongside Eliezer Shostak. The Independent Centre merged into La'am in 1976, and La'am merged into Herut in 1985. In 1988, Likud's factions merged, turning Likud from an alliance into a political party.) Olmert was continuously re-elected to the Knesset as a member of Likud until 1998, when he resigned to avoid holding dual office while serving as Mayor of Jerusalem. In 1988, Olmert was appointed minister without portfolio responsible for minority affairs. Following the dissolution of the twenty-third government, the Cabinet was reshuffled, and Olmert became the Minister of Health, serving until Likud's defeat in the 1992 election.

=== 1993-1999: Mayor of Jerusalem ===
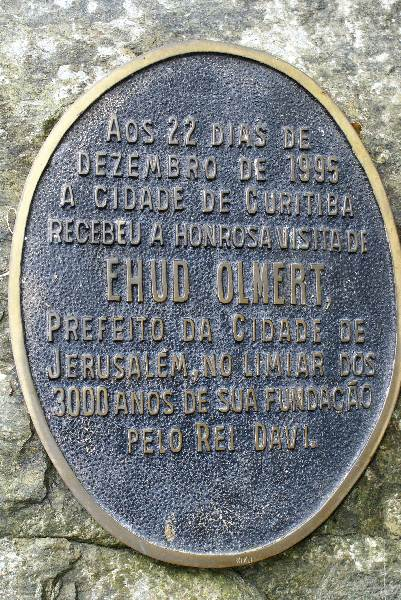
Bronze plate situated in the Wire Opera House in Curitiba, Brazil, commemorating Olmert's visit as mayor of Jerusalem

In 1993, Olmert sought election as Mayor of Jerusalem, challenging longtime incumbent Teddy Kollek. Olmert defeated Kollek by a large margin, becoming the first member of Likud or its precursors to hold the position. He was re-elected to a second term in 1998. He resigned before the end of his term in February 2003, after being elected to another term in the Knesset. During his term as mayor, he devoted himself to the initiation and advancement of major projects in the city, the development and improvement of the education system, and the development of road infrastructure. He also spearheaded the development of the light rail system in Jerusalem, and the investment of millions of shekels in the development of mass transportation options for the city.

While mayor of Jerusalem, Olmert was an invited speaker at an international conflict resolution conference held in Derry, Northern Ireland. In his address, he spoke of how "Political leaders can help change the psychological climate which affects the quality of relationships among people." His speech concluded with reflections on the importance of political process in overcoming differences: "How are fears born? They are born because of differences in tradition and history; they are born because of differences in emotional, political and national circumstances. Because of such differences, people fear they cannot live together. If we are to overcome such fear, a credible and healthy political process must be carefully and painfully developed. A political process that does not aim to change the other or to overcome differences, but that allows each side to live peacefully in spite of their differences."

Olmert ran unsuccessfully for the Leadership of Likud in September 1999, losing to Ariel Sharon.

=== 2003-2006: Deputy prime minister ===
Olmert returned to the Knesset as a member of Likud following the 2003 election. and was the chief negotiator behind the ensuing coalition agreement. Following the elections he was appointed as Designated Acting Prime Minister and Minister of Industry, Trade and Labor. From 2003 to 2005, he also served as Minister of Communications.

On 7 August 2005, Olmert was appointed acting finance minister, replacing Benjamin Netanyahu, who had resigned in protest against the planned Israeli withdrawal from the Gaza Strip. Olmert, who had originally opposed withdrawing from land captured in the Six-Day War, and who had voted against the Camp David Peace Accords in 1978, was a vocal supporter of the Gaza pullout. After his appointment, Olmert said:

I voted against Menachem Begin, I told him it was a historic mistake, how dangerous it would be, and so on and so on. Now I am sorry he is not alive for me to be able to publicly recognize his wisdom and my mistake. He was right and I was wrong. Thank God we pulled out of the Sinai.

Olmert left Likud in November 2005 to join Sharon's newly-formed Kadima party.

=== 2006: Acting prime minister ===
On 4 January 2006, as the designated Acting Prime Minister, Olmert became Acting Prime Minister as a result of the serious stroke suffered by then Prime Minister Ariel Sharon. This occurred after consultations took place between Cabinet Secretary Yisrael Maimon and Attorney General Menachem Mazuz, who declared Sharon "temporarily incapable to carry out the duties of his office", while only officially in office. Then, Olmert and the cabinet reaffirmed in an announcement that the 28 March elections would be held as scheduled. During the days following the stroke, Olmert met with Shimon Peres and other Sharon supporters to try to convince them to stay with Kadima, rather than return to Likud or, in Peres' case, Labor. On 16 January 2006, Olmert was elected chairman of Kadima, and Kadima's candidate for prime minister in the upcoming election.

In his first major policy address on 24 January 2006 after becoming caretaker prime minister, Olmert stated that he backed the creation of a Palestinian state, and that Israel would have to relinquish parts of the West Bank to maintain its Jewish majority. At the same time, he said, "We firmly stand by the historic right of the people of Israel to the entire Land of Israel." In a number of interviews, he also introduced his Realignment plan, which would see Israel unilaterally withdraw from most of the West Bank and redraw its borders to incorporate major settlement blocs into Israel. The plan was shelved following the 2006 Lebanon War.

In the 2006 election, Kadima won 29 seats, making it the largest party. On 6 April, Olmert was officially asked by President Moshe Katsav to form a government. Olmert had an initial period of 28 days to form a governing coalition, with a possible two-week extension. On 11 April, the Israeli Cabinet deemed that Sharon was incapacitated. The 100-day replacement deadline was extended due to the Jewish festival of Passover, and a provision was made that, should Sharon's condition improve between 11 and 14 April, the declaration would not take effect. Therefore, the official declaration took effect on 14 April, formally ending Sharon's term as prime minister and making Olmert the country's new Interim Prime Minister in office (he would not become the official prime minister until he formed a government).

=== 2006-2008: Prime minister of Israel ===
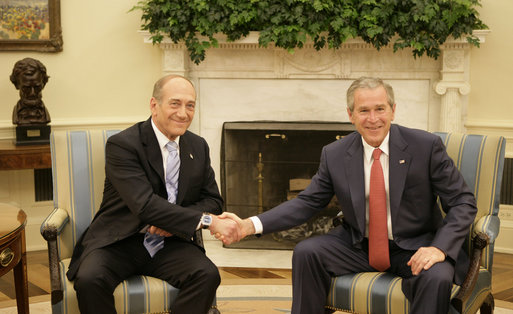
Ehud Olmert and George W. Bush

On 4 May 2006, Olmert presented his new government to the Knesset. Olmert became prime minister and minister for welfare. Control over the Welfare Ministry was expected to be given to United Torah Judaism if it would join the government. The post was later given to Labor's Isaac Herzog. Olmert took over as acting prime minister of Israel after Ariel Sharon suffered a stroke.

On 24 May 2006, Olmert was invited to address a joint session of the U.S. Congress. He stated that his government would proceed with the disengagement plan if it could not come to agreement with the Palestinians. Olmert was the third Israeli prime minister to have been invited to speak at a joint session of Congress.

Following the 2006 Lebanon War, Olmert's popularity ratings fell and, on 15 September 2006, former chief of staff Moshe Ya'alon publicly stated that Olmert should resign. In May 2007, Olmert's approval rating fell to 3%, and he became the subject of a Google Bomb for the Hebrew for "miserable failure".

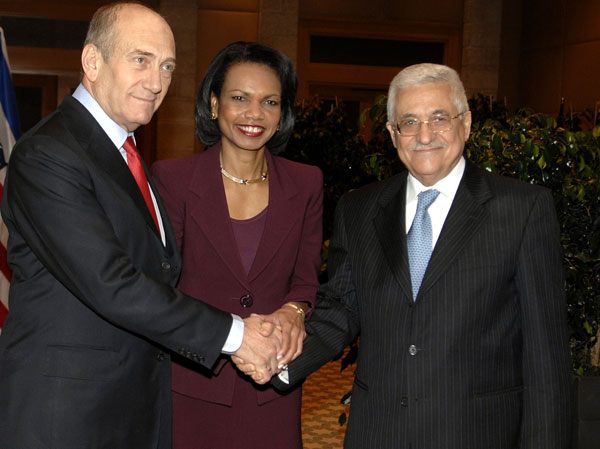
Ehud Olmert meets with Condoleezza Rice and Mahmoud Abbas.

On 9 December 2006, Olmert stated that he could not rule out the possibility of a military attack against Iran, and called for the international community to step up action against that country. He called Iranian President Mahmoud Ahmadinejad's repeated threats to destroy Israel "absolutely criminal", and said that he expected "more dramatic steps to be taken". In an interview with German TV network Sat.1 on 11 December 2006, Olmert included Israel in a list of nuclear powers, saying: "Iran, openly, explicitly and publicly, threatens to wipe Israel off the map. Can you say that this is the same level, when they are aspiring to have nuclear weapons, as America, France, Israel and Russia?" He immediately attempted to backtrack, insisting that Israel's doggedly held position of nuclear weapons ambiguity had not changed. He nonetheless came under harsh criticism from both ends of the Israeli political spectrum due to the perceived threat to Israel's policy of ambiguity regarding its nuclear status. On 2 May 2007, the Winograd Commission accused Olmert of failing to properly manage the 2006 Lebanese War, which prompted a mass rally of over 100,000 people calling for his resignation.

Olmert welcomed the Arab League's 2007 re-endorsement of the Arab Peace Initiative. Olmert wrote in The Guardian newspaper that Israel was ready to make "painful concessions" to achieve peace with the Palestinians.

"I take the offer of full normalization of relations between Israel and the Arab world seriously; and I am ready to discuss the Arab peace initiative in an open and sincere manner. Working with our Jordanian and Egyptian partners, and hopefully other Arab states, we must pursue a comprehensive peace with energy and vision.... But the talks must be a discussion, not an ultimatum."

On 4 November 2007, he declared Israel's intention to negotiate with the Palestinians about all issues, stating, "Annapolis will be the jumping-off point for continued serious and in-depth negotiations, which will not avoid any issue or ignore any division that has clouded our relations with the Palestinian people for many years." On 29 November 2007, he warned of the end of Israel in case a two-state solution is not eventually found for the Israeli-Palestinian dispute. "If the day comes when the two-state solution collapses, and we face a South African-style struggle for equal voting rights (also for the Palestinians in the territories), then, as soon as that happens, the State of Israel is finished", Olmert said on the last day of the Annapolis Conference. "The Jewish organizations, which were our power base in America, will be the first to come out against us", Olmert said, "because they will say they cannot support a state that does not support democracy and equal voting rights for all its residents".

During the talks, Olmert agreed that Israel would share Jerusalem as the joint capital of Israel and a Palestinian state and hand over its holy sites to a multinational committee, land swaps that would allow Israel to keep its major settlement blocs in the West Bank, the construction of a tunnel connecting the West Bank and the Gaza Strip, and a demilitarized Palestinian state with an American-led international security force stationed on the Palestinian–Jordanian border. Both sides disagreed over how much land would be exchanged in the swaps, with Olmert demanding at least 6.3–6.8% of the West Bank and Abbas insisting a swap would not exceed 1.9%. In his memoirs, Olmert wrote that he agreed Israel would generously compensate the remaining refugees. Olmert later stated that U.S. President George W. Bush offered to accept another 100,000 refugees as American citizens if a peace agreement was signed. U.S. Secretary of State Condoleezza Rice wrote in her memoirs that the Palestinians demanded they be allowed to negotiate additional "returns" to Israel following the peace deal, insisting that the right of return was a matter of individual choice that would ultimately have to apply to every refugee. In his memoirs, Olmert claimed that he and Abbas were very close to an agreement, but Abbas' hesitation, Olmert's legal troubles, and the 2008-2009 Gaza War caused the talks to end. President Bush wrote in his memoirs that the talks broke down when Olmert announced that he would resign from office, and Abbas then broke off the talks and refused to finalize an agreement on the grounds that he did not want to sign a peace deal with a prime minister on his way out of office.

During at least two meetings, Olmert made a secret promise to Abbas: Once a prisoner exchange deal for captive Israeli soldier Gilad Shalit was finalized with Hamas, Israel would bolster Abbas' government by releasing Fatah prisoners. After a prisoner exchange deal was agreed upon in 2011 under Prime Minister Benjamin Netanyahu, Olmert's successor, Palestinian officials demanded that Netanyahu live up to Olmert's promise and release Fatah prisoners.

On 6 September 2007, Israel launched Operation Orchard, an airstrike against a suspected nuclear reactor in Syria, allegedly being built with North Korean and Iranian assistance. The strike was preceded by years of covert operations by Israeli special forces and the Mossad. Details of the strike were censored in Israel, and the attack was not confirmed to have taken place until 2 October. Following the attack, Olmert's approval rating rose to 35%.

President Bush wrote in his memoirs that Olmert had first asked him to bomb the facility, but ordered the attack after Bush refused and told him that he would prefer diplomatic action and sanctions. Following the strike, Bush claimed to have suggested to Olmert to hide the strike for a while and then make it public as a way to isolate the Syrian government, but Olmert asked for total secrecy, wanting to avoid anything that could force Syria to retaliate. However, Israeli columnist Caroline Glick wrote that Israel had bowed to US demands in concealing the airstrike.

In May 2008, Israel opened Turkish-brokered indirect peace talks with Syria. Olmert stated that the resumption of peace talks with Syria was a national obligation that must be tried. However, Syria broke off the talks several months later in response to the Gaza War.

Rocket and mortar attacks by Palestinian militants from the Hamas-controlled Gaza Strip on Israel occurred frequently throughout the spring and summer of 2008, until a ceasefire was agreed between Hamas and Israel in June. Rocket attacks increased sharply in November after an Israeli raid on a Hamas-built smuggling tunnel. The ceasefire expired in December 2008 and negotiations stalled between the two parties to renew the ceasefire. On 24 December, the Negev was hit by more than 60 mortar shells and Katyusha and Qassam rockets, and the IDF was given a green light to operate. Hamas claimed to have fired a total of 87 rockets and mortar rounds that day at Israel, code-naming the firing "Operation Oil Stain".

On 25 December 2008, Olmert delivered a "last minute" warning to Gaza in direct appeal to Gaza's people via the Arabic language satellite channel al-Arabiya, to pressure their leaders to stop the rocket barrages. "I am telling them now, it may be the last minute, I'm telling them stop it. We are stronger", he said. The attacks did not stop and Israel launched its military operation, codenamed Operation Cast Lead, on the morning of 27 December, when more than 50 fighter jets and attack helicopters began to bomb strategic targets. Air and naval strikes continued for days, when on 3 January 2009 the IDF began a ground invasion of the Gaza Strip. The fighting lasted 22 days until a ceasefire came into effect. Israel subsequently withdrew from Gaza.

On 1 February 2009, Olmert stated:

We've said that if there is rocket fire against the south of the country, there will be a severe and disproportionate Israeli response to the fire on the citizens of Israel and its security forces.

The UN Security Council passed a resolution on 8 January 2009 calling for an immediate ceasefire to the hostilities in the Gaza Strip. It passed 14–0–1, with one abstention from the United States. Olmert told reporters, "[U.S. Secretary of State Condoleezza Rice] was left shamed. A resolution that she prepared and arranged, and in the end she did not vote in favor. In the night between Thursday and Friday, when the Secretary of State wanted to lead the vote on a ceasefire at the Security Council, we did not want her to vote in favor. I said 'get me President Bush on the phone'. They said he was in the middle of giving a speech in Philadelphia. I said I didn't care. 'I need to talk to him now'. He got off the podium and spoke to me. I told him the United States could not vote in favor. It cannot vote in favor of such a resolution. He immediately called the Secretary of State and told her not to vote in favor." When asked about the comments, a White House spokesman said that Olmert's version of events was "inaccurate".

The war ended on 18 January 2009. A day before, Israeli officials announced a unilateral ceasefire, without an agreement with Hamas. In a press conference, Olmert declared the ceasefire effective that night, at 00:00 GMT.

=== 2008: Resignation as prime minister ===
On 30 July 2008, Olmert announced that he would not contest the Kadima party leadership election in September and would resign from office once his party elects a new leader. In his resignation speech, he said he was "proud to be a citizen of a country in which a Prime Minister can be investigated like any other citizen", but also stated he "was forced to defend [himself] from ceaseless attacks by the self-appointed soldiers of justice, who sought to oust [him] from [his] position". The move was interpreted as signaling the end of Olmert's political career.

Many politicians across the political spectrum praised Olmert's decision to resign. Foreign Minister Tzipi Livni said "the personal decision was not simple, but it was a correct one. Kadima must continue to act in a way that will preserve its unity and ability to lead." Defense minister and Labor party leader Ehud Barak called Olmert's announcement "a proper and responsible decision made at the right time". Opposition leaders called for the resignation to be followed by general elections. The Likud party leader, Benjamin Netanyahu, called for snap elections: "It doesn't matter who heads Kadima. They are all partners in this government's total failure. National responsibility requires a return to the people and new elections."

After Tzipi Livni won the leadership election, Olmert officially resigned but remained prime minister, according to the dictates of the law. Even after an official resignation, he remained in power until a new prime minister was sworn in, in order to prevent a government void. Livni tried unsuccessfully to form a new coalition government. After Livni announced she could not form the new government, new parliamentary elections were set for 10 February 2009, and Olmert remained in power until after the elections, just as the law dictates.

== Post-premiership ==
In 2009, Olmert spoke at various colleges throughout the United States to mixed receptions. In October 2009, he visited Magnolia, Arkansas, and spoke about Israeli farming, technology and Israel's view on Iran. The speech was given at Southern Arkansas University, where he also invited the rural university to form a partnership with Israel's Hebrew University of Jerusalem.

In 2012, Olmert expressed opposition to a military strike on Iran. In July 2019, he canceled a visit to Switzerland after being notified that he would face questioning for his role in Operation Cast Lead. In February 2020, Olmert held a joint press conference with Palestinian President Mahmoud Abbas, calling for direct negotiations with the Palestinian Authority as part of the Trump peace plan.

In 2013 it was revealed in the Snowden disclosures that Olmert was a target of espionage by the National Security Agency.

Olmert endorsed Blue and White in the September 2019 and 2020 elections and the Israeli Labor Party In the 2021 and 2022 elections. He also became a Haaretz columnist alongside former Meretz leader Zehava Galon and former Prime Minister Ehud Barak.

In 2025, Olmert opined in a Haaretz article that Israel was committing war crimes against Palestinians amid the Gaza War. He criticized the large Palestinian death toll in the conflict, and questioned the goals of the IDF and its ability to win the war. He labeled the Israeli government under Prime Minister Benjamin Netanyahu a "criminal gang" and suggested that the war was being intentionally prolonged for Netanyahu's political benefit. Olmert said that while he believed Israel was not violating the laws of war when dealing with Gaza in the past, he was now "no longer able to do so," citing indiscriminate targeting of civilians "knowingly, evilly, maliciously, irresponsibly" committed by Israel.

== Corruption and bribery investigations ==
Beginning in the mid-1980s, Olmert was subjected to a string of corruption allegations that resulted in multiple police investigations. According to Israeli journalist Yossi Melman, the repeated investigations led some to believe that Olmert was corrupt but a master at covering his tracks, while others believed that the authorities were simply obsessed with harassing him.

In 1996, Olmert was investigated on suspicions of breaking party finance laws while serving as Treasurer of Likud, but was acquitted of all charges.

On 7 March 2006, it was disclosed that an inquiry was being carried out on the 1999 sale and lease-back of a Jerusalem property purchased by Olmert in 2004, which allegedly was done on financial terms very favorable to Olmert, in what would amount to an illegal campaign contribution and/or bribe. Olmert was alleged to have paid $325,000 below market value. A criminal investigation regarding the matter was formally launched on 24 September 2007. The investigation closed in August 2009 due to lack of evidence.

On 16 January 2007, a criminal investigation was initiated against Olmert on suspicion that during his tenure as finance minister, he tried to steer the tender for the sale of Bank Leumi in order to help Slovak-born Australian real estate baron Frank Lowy, a close personal associate. Israeli Finance Ministry Accountant General Dr. Yaron Zelekha was as a key witness, according to the State Comptroller's office. The state comptroller testified against Olmert. Israeli Police who investigated the case eventually concluded that the evidence that was collected was insufficient for indictment, and no recommendations were made to press charges. In October 2007, he was questioned for five hours by three officers from the National Fraud Investigations Unit in his Jerusalem residence. State Prosecutor Moshe Lador closed the case in December 2008 due to lack of evidence.

In April 2007, it was further alleged that while Olmert was Minister of Trade, Industry and Labor, he may have been guilty of criminal behavior by taking an active part in an investment center. Prosecutors said that Olmert placed himself in a conflict of interest by personally dealing with issues involving business figures represented by his friend and former business partner, lawyer Uri Messer. Olmert was alleged to have changed some decisions made by his ministry in their favor. During a parliamentary inquest in July 2007, Olmert flatly denied these accusations.

In October 2007, Attorney General Mazuz ordered a police investigation into allegations that Olmert, when he held the positions of trade minister, communications minister and finance minister, had improperly appointed associates from the Likud party to posts on government bodies. Police completed their investigation in 2009, and concluded that there was a basis to indict Olmert and others for fraud and breach of trust.

In July 2008, Haaretz reported that in 1992, Olmert took a loan from U.S. businessman Joe Almaliah but never repaid it and concealed the size of the loan from the State Comptroller. In March 2003, State Comptroller Eliezer Goldberg asked Olmert to submit the wealth-declaration statement required of all cabinet ministers. Olmert disclosed that he had taken a loan from Almaliah, but did not say when it was due. In 2004, Olmert conceded that he had taken $75,000, and stressed that Almaliah had not asked for repayment of the loan. At Goldberg's insistence, Olmert signed a contract with Almaliah undertaking to repay the loan in January 2009. According to an indictment, Olmert had actually taken another $100,000 from Almaliah, which was deposited into his personal bank account. The State Prosecutor's office said that it was not aware of Olmert's repayment of either loan.

=== Bribery investigation ===
In May 2008, Olmert was the subject of another police investigation on allegations of bribery. Olmert said that he took campaign contributions from Jewish-American businessman Morris Talansky when he was running for mayor of Jerusalem, leadership of the Likud and candidacy in the Likud list for the Knesset. It was alleged that Olmert unlawfully received millions of shekels in illegal campaign funding from Talansky over a 15-year period. Olmert resisted calls to resign, and stated: "I never took bribes, I never took a penny for myself. I was elected by you, citizens of Israel, to be the Prime Minister and I don't intend to shirk this responsibility. If Attorney General Meni Mazuz, decides to file an indictment, I will resign from my position, even though the law does not oblige me to do so." On 2 May, head of the National Fraud Investigations Unit Brigadier-General Shlomi Ayalon and two investigators questioned Olmert for 90 minutes in his Jerusalem residence. On 23 May, National Fraud Investigations Unit officers interrogated Olmert for an hour in his Jerusalem residence. On 27 May, Talansky testified in court that over the last 15 years he gave Olmert more than $150,000 in cash in envelopes to fund political campaigns, and hinted that Olmert also used the money for fine hotels, cigars, pens and watches. On 6 September 2008, the Israel Police recommended that criminal charges should be brought against Olmert. In their indictment, prosecutors claimed that Olmert had received some $600,000 from Talansky in either cash or bank transfers, and that $350,000 of this was held in a "secret cache" managed by Olmert's close associate Uri Messer. The prosecution also claimed that Olmert used his official capacity as minister of trade and industry to facilitate introductions with hotel managers for Talansky, a partner in a firm providing mini-bars for hotels. It was alleged that Olmert sometimes used official letterheads. The charge sheet said that Olmert was aware he was in an "acute conflict of interest".

On 26 November 2008, Attorney General Menachem Mazuz informed Olmert that he would be indicted in the so-called "Rishon Tours" affair, pending a hearing before Mazuz. The scheme allegedly worked as follows: Olmert would speak abroad on behalf of groups such as the Yad Vashem Holocaust memorial, a support group for the Israel Defense Forces or a charity for mentally disabled Israeli children. Rishon Tours then billed each group for the same trip as if they alone were paying, and placed the money in a special bank account allegedly for Olmert's personal use. Prosecutors charged that Olmert had gained $92,164.

On 1 March 2009, Attorney General Mazuz announced that he would file an indictment against him in what is known as the "cash envelopes" affair, pending a hearing before the attorney general.

In 2010, the National Fraud Investigations Unit accused Olmert of involvement in the "Holyland Affair", where officials took bribes in exchange for promoting real estate projects, especially the Holyland real estate development project in southwest Jerusalem, which was allowed to grow 1,200% beyond the limit authorized. As Mayor of Jerusalem, Olmert allegedly took thousands of shekels in bribe money from businessmen, entrepreneurs, and stakeholders.

=== Indictments, trials and criminal convictions ===
On 30 August 2009, an indictment against Olmert was served at the Jerusalem District Court. The indictment includes the following counts: obtaining by fraud under aggravating circumstances, fraud, breach of trust, falsifying corporate documents, and tax evasion. The indictment refers to three out of the four corruption-related cases standing against him: "Rishon Tours", "Talansky" (also known as the "money envelopes" affair), and the "Investment Center". This was the first indictment of someone who has ever held the office of Israeli Prime Minister. On 25 September 2009, Olmert's trial opened. The court began hearing testimonies on 22 February 2010, with three discussions per week. The prosecution began arguing its case at the beginning of the trial, and the prosecution phase ended on 30 March 2011. The defense phase began on 31 May, and they began with Olmert testifying in his own defense. On 30 June, the prosecution began a cross-examination on the various charges.

In January 2012, Olmert was indicted for taking bribes over the Holyland affair. The indictment was filed in the Tel Aviv District Court. After Olmert began accusing his secretary, Shula Zaken, of committing the crimes he was charged with, Zaken began negotiating a plea bargain with prosecutors. In late March 2014, prosecutors signed a plea bargain with Zaken, under which she would plead guilty, and prosecutors would not request a prison term longer than 11 months. As part of the plea bargain, Zaken agreed to provide evidence and testify against Olmert as a state's witness.

On 10 July 2012, Olmert was convicted on one count of breach of trust over the investment center case, but exonerated over the Talansky and Rishon Tours affairs. In September 2012, he was given a one-year suspended sentence and a fine of ₪75,000 ($21,000).

On 31 March 2014, five years to the day after he was replaced by Benjamin Netanyahu as prime minister, Olmert was convicted of two counts of bribery over the Holyland affair by Tel Aviv District Court Judge David Rosen, who ruled that he had accepted ₪560,000 ($160,000) while serving as mayor of Jerusalem, and had lied about it in court. He was acquitted on two other corruption charges. Olmert and eight other defendants, including former Jerusalem mayor Uri Lupolianski and former Bank Hapoalim chairman Dan Dankner, were convicted of accepting bribes in exchange for helping land developers receive municipality licenses for the Holyland Park residential project in the city.

Olmert's sentencing hearing began on 28 April 2014. On 13 May 2014, he was sentenced to 6 years in prison and fined ₪1.5 million ($430,000). He was ordered to report to prison on 1 September to begin serving his sentence.

In addition to the Holyland affair, Zaken provided new evidence against Olmert in the Talansky and Rishon tours affairs. Olmert and his lawyers were subsequently questioned by police on suspicion of obstruction of justice and witness tampering. Following an investigation, police announced that there was sufficient evidence to indict Olmert for obstruction of justice. On 7 August 2014, following Zaken's testimony, the Israeli Supreme Court ordered a retrial of Olmert in the Talansky case.

In September 2014, the Supreme Court ruled that Olmert could stay out of prison pending an appeal. Oral arguments would have to take place within three months, but together with the delay in the final verdict he could potentially stay out of prison for over a year. He began serving a 19-month sentence on 15 February 2016 in Maasiyahu Prison.

In December 2014, Zaken again provided new evidence, revealing that Olmert had offered her $10,000 for every month she would serve in jail for taking the blame in the Holyland case, to be paid in a foreign bank account. In one of the eight recordings revealed, Olmert can also be heard talking about buying Sheldon Adelson's, a Jewish-American billionaire's, testimony, and how he told U.S. President George W. Bush about Olmert's traitorship: "Adelson – this dog, son of a dog – went to President Bush and said that I’m a traitor. Bush told me."

In March 2015, Olmert was convicted in Jerusalem District Court of fraud, breach of trust, and tax evasion in his retrial on corruption charges over the Talansky case. The judges ruled that he had taken bribes and used the funds for personal reasons without reporting it. Sentencing was set for May, and his lawyers advised he would appeal.

Olmert was sentenced to eight months in prison in connection with the Talansky case on 25 May 2015, as well as fined ₪100,000 ($25,000) and given an additional suspended sentence of eight months. The prison sentence was stayed for 45 days to allow Olmert's legal team time to appeal the ruling. The verdict acknowledged Olmert's public service, and he was given a weaker sentence than prosecutors sought. Olmert filed an appeal of his conviction to the Supreme Court of Israel in July 2015; the court agreed that Olmert's sentence would be suspended until after the outcome of the appeal.

Olmert eventually served 16 months of a 27-month prison sentence before being released on parole in early July 2017.

== Personal life ==
Olmert is married to Aliza, an author, playwright and artist. The couple has four biological children and an adopted daughter. The oldest daughter, Michal, holds a master's in psychology and leads workshops in creative thinking. Another daughter Dana is a lecturer in literature at the Tel Aviv University, the editor of a literature series, and a member of the Israeli human rights organization Machsom Watch. She is a lesbian and lives with her partner in Tel Aviv. Her parents are accepting of her sexual orientation and partner.

In October 2007, Olmert was diagnosed with prostate cancer.

== Notes ==
Political offices
Preceded by Ariel Sharon	Prime Minister of Israel; 2006–2009	Succeeded by Benjamin Netanyahu
Party political offices
Preceded by Ariel Sharon	Leader of Kadima; 2006–2008	Succeeded by Tzipi Livni
