= January 1999 Likud leadership election =

Likud leadership election

← 1993	25 January 1999	1999 (Sep) →
- Turnout: 31.3%
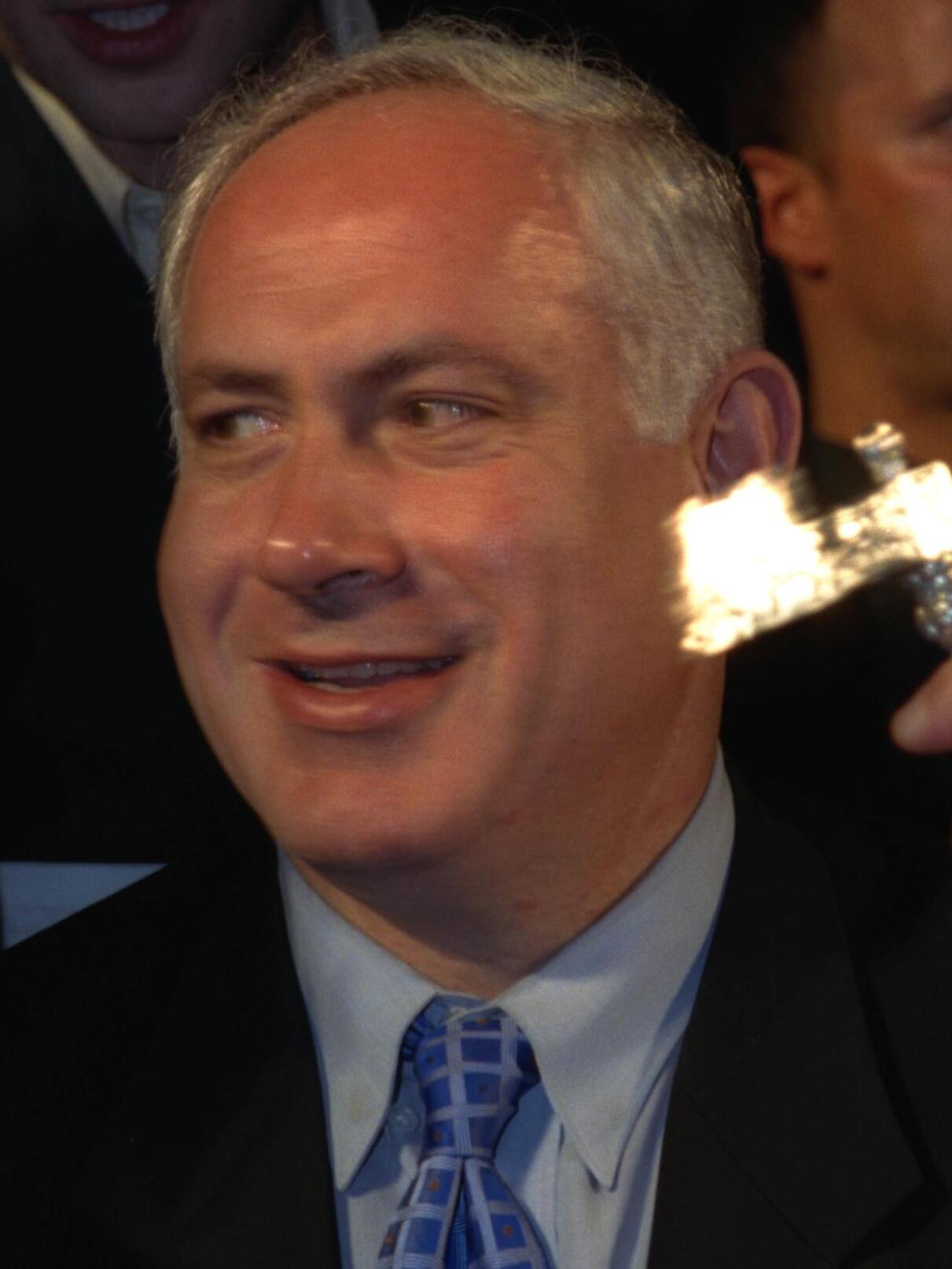

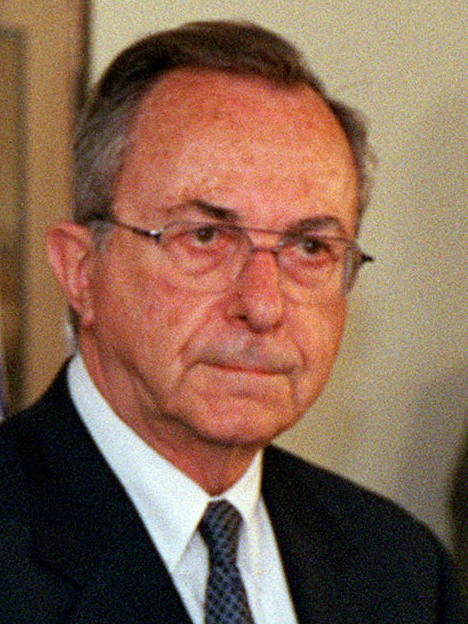
Candidate	Benjamin Netanyahu	Moshe Arens
Percentage	81.7%	18.3%
Leader before election
Benjamin Netanyahu
Elected Leader
Benjamin Netanyahu

The January 1999 Likud leadership election was held on 25 January 1999 to elect the leader of the Likud party. Incumbent party leader and prime minister Benjamin Netanyahu handily defended a challenge by former minister of defense Moshe Arens.

The election coincided with the primary to select the party's electoral list for the 1999 Israeli general election.

== Candidates ==
=== Running ===
- Moshe Arens, former member of the Knesset (1973–1992); former minister of defense (1984–1988 and 1990–1992), former minister of foreign affairs (1988–1990); former minister without portfolio (1988–1990)
- Benjamin Netanyahu, prime minister since 1996, Likud party leader since 1993, member of the Knesset since 1988

=== Withdrew ===
- Uzi Landau, member of the Knesset since 1984

== Background ==
The vote took part ahead of the 1999 Israeli general election, held after Netanyahu's governing coalition collapsed. There had been several defections from the party leading up to the leadership race, including Benny Begin and Dan Meridor, who both defected to lead their own parties in the 1999 general election.

Moshe Arens was a veteran of the Likud party that had formerly been a mentor to Netanyahu and had fully supported Netanyahu's candidacy in the 1993 Likud leadership election. However, Arens had broken away from Netanyahu after Netanyahu became prime minister in 1996. Arens, and several other veterans of Likud, began to distrust Netanyahu after he became prime minister, disapproving of many of the choices Netanyahu had made for political appointees. Arens ended six years of political retirement to challenge Netanyahu for the leadership of Likud. He declared that he was the only one that could, "stop the internal hemorrhaging in the Likud." Political analysts saw Arens' chances of unseating Netanyahu as being unlikely.

== Electorate ==
The leadership election was open to the party's general membership, which, at the time, numbered at 168,127.

== Result ==
January 1999 Likud leadership election
Candidate	Votes	%
Benjamin Netanyahu (incumbent)		81.7
Moshe Arens		18.3
Voter turnout	31.3%	

== Aftermath ==
Shortly after the election, Netanyahu appointed Arens minister of defense. In May, Netanyahu was defeated by Ehud Barak in the general election, and subsequently resigned as party leader.
