= Likud =

Israeli right-wing political party

Likud – National Liberal Movement הליכוד – תנועה לאומית ליברלית
- Chairperson: Benjamin Netanyahu
- Founder: Menachem Begin
- Founded: 1973 (alliance); 25 August 1988 (unified party)
- Merger of: Gahal (Herut and Liberal Party), Free Centre, National List and Movement for Greater Israel
- Headquarters: Metzudat Ze'ev, 38 King George Street, Tel Aviv
- Youth wing: Likud Youth
- LGBT wing: Likud Pride
- Membership (2022): 137,000
- Ideology: Conservatism (Israeli); National conservatism; Economic liberalism; Right-wing populism; Zionism; Historical: Revisionist Zionism; Liberal conservatism
- Political position: Right-wing to far-right
- European affiliation: ECR Party (global partner); Patriots.eu (observer)
- International affiliation: International Democracy Union
- Colours: Blue
- Knesset: 27 / 120

Election symbol
- מחל م‌ح‌ل

Party flag

Website
- www.likud.org.il/en/

Likud (Note: Hebrew pronunciation: [li'kud]) (Hebrew: הַלִּיכּוּד, romanized: HaLikud, lit. 'The Consolidation'), officially known as Likud – National Liberal Movement (Hebrew: הַלִּיכּוּד – תנועה לאומית ליברלית, romanized: HaLikud – Tnu'ah Leumit Liberalit), also known as The Likud, is a major right-wing to far-right political party in Israel. It was founded in 1973 by Menachem Begin and Ariel Sharon in an alliance with several right-wing parties. Likud's landslide victory in the 1977 elections was a major turning point in the country's political history, marking the first time the left had lost power. In addition, it was the first time in Israel that a right-wing party received the most votes. After ruling the country for most of the 1980s, the party lost the Knesset election in 1992. Likud's candidate Benjamin Netanyahu won the vote for prime minister in 1996 and was given the task of forming a government after the 1996 elections following Yitzak Rabin's assassination. Netanyahu's government fell apart after a vote of no confidence, which led to elections being called in 1999 and Likud losing power to the One Israel coalition led by Ehud Barak.

In 2001 Likud's Ariel Sharon, who replaced Netanyahu following the 1999 election, defeated Barak in an election called by the prime minister following his resignation. After the party recorded a convincing win in the 2003 elections, Likud saw a major split in 2005 when Sharon left to form the Kadima party. This resulted in Likud slumping to fourth place in the 2006 elections and losing 28 seats in the Knesset. Following the 2009 elections, Likud was able to gain 15 seats, and, with Netanyahu back in control of the party, formed a coalition with fellow right-wing parties Yisrael Beiteinu and Shas to take control of the government from Kadima, which earned a plurality, but not a majority. Netanyahu served as prime minister from then until 2021. Likud had been the leading vote-getter in each subsequent election until April 2019, when Likud tied with Blue and White and September 2019, when Blue and White won one more seat than the Likud. Likud won the most seats in the 2020 and 2021 elections, but Netanyahu was removed from power in June 2021 by an unprecedented coalition led by Yair Lapid and Naftali Bennett. He subsequently returned to the office of prime minister after winning the 2022 election. The party won the most seats in the 2026 Israeli legislative election, with 27.

A member of the party is called a Likudnik (Hebrew: לִכּוּדְנִיק) and the party's election symbol is מחל (Arabic: م‌ح‌ل), reflecting the party's origins as an electoral list of several pre-existing parties, including those who used the symbols מ, ח, and ל.

== History ==
=== Formation and leadership of Begin ===
The Likud was formed on 13 September 1973 as a secular party by an alliance of several right-wing parties prior to that year's legislative election—Herut, the Liberal Party, the Free Centre, the National List, and the Movement for Greater Israel. Herut had been the nation's largest right-wing party since growing out of the Irgun in 1948. It had already been in coalition with the Liberals since 1965 as Gahal, with Herut as the senior partner. Herut remained the senior partner in the new grouping, which was given the name Likud, meaning "Consolidation", as it represented the consolidation of the Israeli right. It worked as a coalition under Herut's leadership until 25 August 1988, when the member parties merged into a single party under the Likud name. From its establishment in 1973, Likud enjoyed great support from blue-collar Sephardim.

In its first election Likud won 39 seats, reducing the Alignment's lead to 12. The party went on to win the 1977 election with 43 seats, finishing 11 seats ahead of the Alignment. Menachem Begin formed a government with the support of the religious parties, consigning the left wing to opposition for the first time since independence. A former leader of the hard-line paramilitary Irgun, Begin signed the 1978 Camp David Accords and the 1979 Egypt–Israel peace treaty. In the 1981 election, the Likud won 48 seats, but formed a narrower government than in 1977.

Likud has long been a loose alliance between politicians committed to different and sometimes opposing policy preferences and ideologies. The 1981 election highlighted divisions that existed between the populist wing of Likud, headed by David Levy of Herut, and the Liberal wing, who represented a policy agenda of the secular bourgeoisie.

=== Shamir and Netanyahu's first term ===
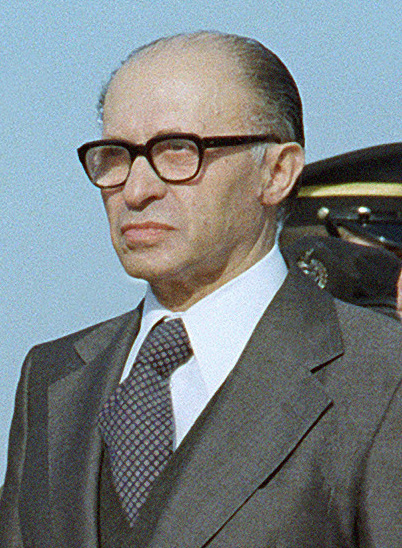
Menachem Begin, the founder of Likud

On 28 August 1983 Begin announced his intention to resign as prime minister. He was replaced by Yitzhak Shamir, a former commander of the Lehi underground, who defeated Deputy Prime Minister David Levy in a leadership election held by Herut's central committee. Shamir was seen as a hard-liner, who opposed the Camp David accords and Israel's withdrawal from Southern Lebanon. The party won 41 seats in the 1984 election, less than the Alignment's 44. The Alignment was unable to form a government on its own, leading to the formation of a rotation government, led jointly by the Alignment and Likud. Shimon Peres became the prime minister, with Shamir becoming the foreign minister. In October 1986, the two switched posts. The Likud won the 1988 election, defeating the Alignment by a one-seat Margin. The two parties formed another government, in which Shamir served as prime minister without a rotation. In 1990 Peres withdrew from the government and led a successful vote of no confidence against it, in what became known as the dirty trick. Shamir formed a new government with right-wing parties, which served until the 1992 election, in which the Likud was defeated by Yitzhak Rabin's Labor Party.

Shamir stepped down as Likud leader after losing the election in March 1993. To replace him, the party held its first primary election, in which former United Nations Ambassador Benjamin Netanyahu defeated David Levy, Benny Begin and Moshe Katsav, becoming the Leader of the Opposition. In 1995, following the assassination of Yitzhak Rabin, Shimon Peres, his temporary successor, decided to call early elections in order to give the government a mandate to advance the peace process. The election was held in May 1996, and included a direct vote for the prime minister in which Netanyahu narrowly defeated Peres, becoming the new prime minister.

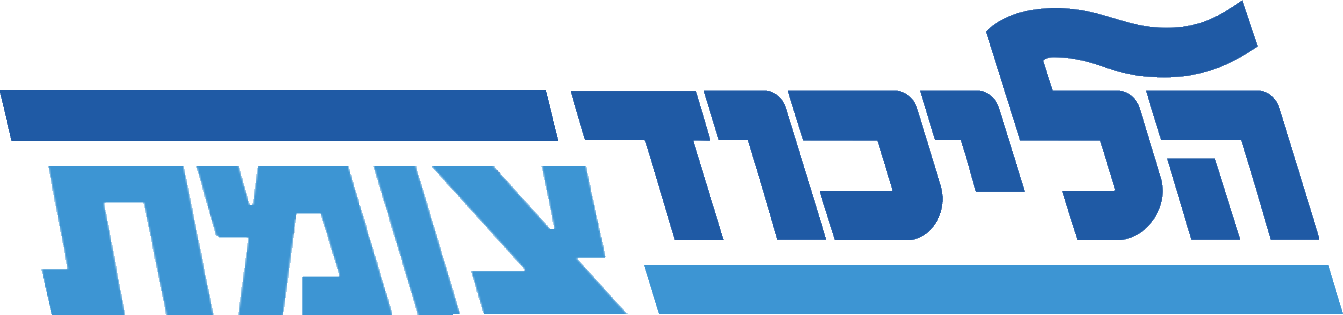
Logo of the Likud-Tzomet List from the 1996 election

In 1998 Netanyahu agreed to cede territory in the Wye River Memorandum, which led some Likud MKs, led by Benny Begin (Menachem Begin's son), Michael Kleiner and David Re'em, to break away and form a new party, named Herut – The National Movement. The new party was endorsed by Yitzhak Shamir, who expressed disappointment in Netanyahu's leadership. Following the withdrawal of his remaining partners, Netanyahu's coalition collapsed in December 1998, resulting in the 1999 election, where Labor's Ehud Barak defeated Netanyahu on a platform promoting the settlement of final status issues. Following his defeat, Netanyahu stepped down as leader of Likud. That September, former Defense Minister Ariel Sharon won a leadership election to replace Netanyahu, defeating Jerusalem Mayor Ehud Olmert and former Finance Minister Meir Sheetrit.

Barak's government collapsed in December 2000, several months after the Camp David Summit ended without an agreement, and early elections for Prime Minister were called for February 2001, in which Sharon decisively defeated Barak. In 2002 Netanyahu challenged Sharon in a leadership election, but was defeated. During Sharon's tenure, Likud faced an internal split due to Sharon's policy of unilateral disengagement from Gaza and parts of the West Bank, which proved extremely divisive within the party.

=== Sharon and Kadima split ===
Sharon's Disengagement Plan alienated him from some Likud supporters and fragmented the party. He faced several serious challenges to his authority shortly before his departure. The first was in March 2005, when he and Netanyahu, then his finance minister, proposed a budget plan that met fierce opposition from the opposition and parties to the Likud's right. The plan passed the Knesset's finance committee by a one-vote margin, before being approved by the Knesset by a wider margin later that month. The second was in September 2005, when Sharon's critics in the Likud, led by Netanyahu, forced a vote in the Likud's central committee on a proposal for an early leadership election, which was defeated by 52% to 48%. In November, Sharon's opponents within the Likud joined with the opposition to prevent the appointment of three of his associates to the Cabinet, successfully preventing the appointment of two.

On 20 November 2005 Labor announced its withdrawal from Sharon's governing coalition following the election of the left-wing Amir Peretz as its leader. On 21 November 2005, Sharon announced he would be leaving the Likud and forming a new centrist party, Kadima. The new party included both Likud and Labor supporters of unilateral disengagement. Sharon also announced that an election would take place in early 2006. Seven candidates had declared themselves as contenders to replace Sharon as leader: Netanyahu, Uzi Landau, Shaul Mofaz, Yisrael Katz, Silvan Shalom and Moshe Feiglin. Landau and Mofaz later withdrew, the former in favour of Netanyahu and the latter to join Kadima.

=== Netanyahu's second term ===
Netanyahu went on to win a leadership election to replace Sharon in December, obtaining 44.4% of the vote. Silvan Shalom came in second with 33%, while far-right candidate Moshe Feiglin achieved 12.4% of the vote. Due to Shalom's performance, Netanyahu guaranteed him the second place on the party's list of Knesset candidates. Polls before the 2006 election showed a substantial reduction in the Likud's support, with Kadima achieving a dominant polling lead.

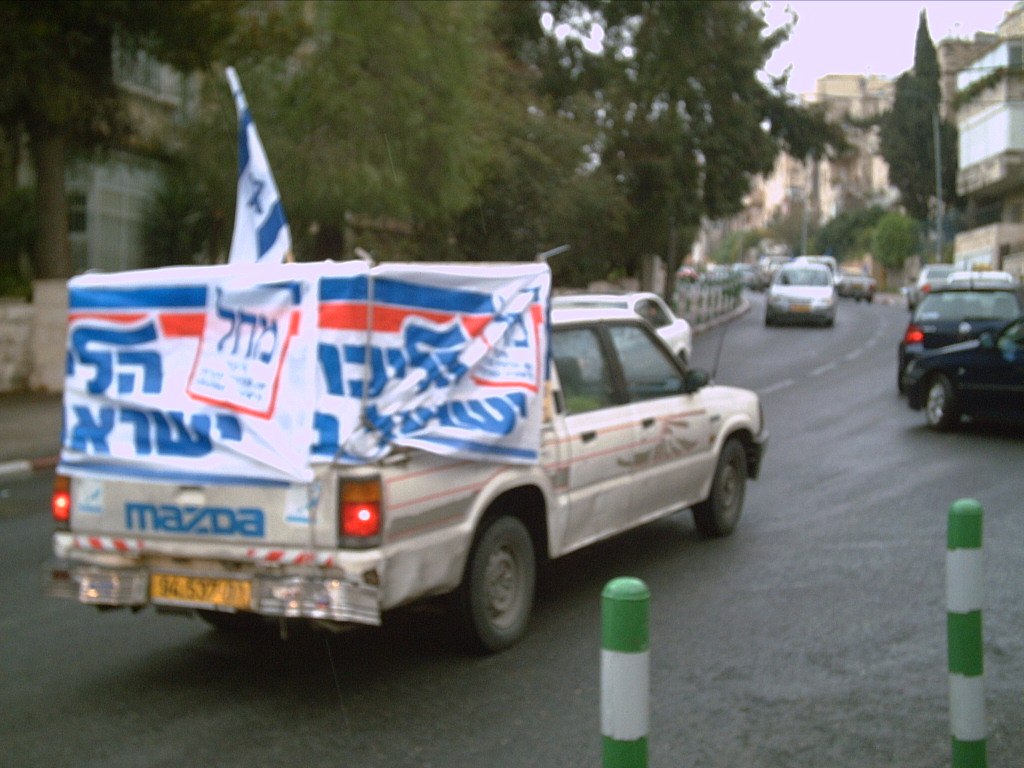
A truck canvassing for Likud in Jerusalem in advance of the 2006 election

In January 2006 Sharon suffered a stroke that left him in a vegetative state, leading to his replacement as Kadima leader by Ehud Olmert, who led Kadima to victory in the election, winning 29 seats. The Likud experienced a substantial loss in support, coming in fourth place and winning only 12, while other right-wing nationalist parties such as Yisrael Beiteinu, which came within 116 votes of overtaking Likud, gained votes. After the election, Netanyahu was re-elected Likud Leader in 2007, defeating Feiglin and World Likud Chairman Danny Danon.

Following the opening of several criminal investigations against Olmert, he resigned as prime minister on 21 September 2008 and retired from politics. In the ensuing snap election, held in 2009, Likud won 27 seats, the second-largest number of seats and one seat less than Kadima, now led by Tzipi Livni. However, Likud's allies won enough seats to allow Netanyahu to form a government, which included Likud, Yisrael Beiteinu, Shas, United Torah Judaism, The Jewish Home, and Labor. Labor left the coalition in 2011 after party leader Ehud Barak left to form his own party, Independence, that remained a member of Netanyahu's government. The next year, Netanyahu was re-elected as Likud leader, defeating Moshe Feiglin. Kadima then joined the coalition in May 2012 before leaving in July. Following Kadima's withdrawal from the government and amid disagreements related to the 2013 budget, the Knesset was dissolved in October 2012 and a snap election was called for January 2013.

==== Partnership with Yisrael Beitenu and 2015 election ====
Several days after the election was called on 25 October 2012, Netanyahu and Yisrael Beitenu leader Avigdor Lieberman announced that their respective political parties would run together on a single ballot in the election under the name Likud Yisrael Beiteinu. The move led to speculation that Lieberman would eventually seek the leadership of Likud after he stated that he "wanted to become the Prime Minister". Several days before the election, Lieberman said the parties would not merge, and that their direct partnership would end after the election. The partnership ultimately lasted until July 2014, when it officially dissolved.

In the 2013 elections the Likud–Yisrael Beiteinu alliance won 31 seats, 20 of which were Likud members. The second largest party, Yair Lapid's Yesh Atid, won 19. Netanyahu continued as prime minister after forming a coalition with Yesh Atid, the Jewish Home, and Hatnuah. The government collapsed in December 2014 due to disagreements over the budget and the proposed Nation-state bill, triggering a snap election the next year.

Likud won the 2015 election, defeating the Zionist Union, an alliance of Labor and Hatnuah, winning 30 seats to the Zionist Union's 24. The party subsequently formed a government with United Torah Judaism, Shas, Kulanu, and the Jewish Home. In May 2016, Yisrael Beitenu joined the government, before leaving in December 2018, causing Netanyahu to call a snap election for April 2019.

=== 2019–2022 elections ===
During the course of the April 2019 Israeli legislative election campaign, Likud facilitated the formation of the Union of Right-Wing Parties between the Jewish Home, Tkuma and Otzma Yehudit by providing a slot on its own electoral list to Jewish Home candidate Eli Ben-Dahan. In the aftermath of the election, Kulanu merged into Likud.

During the September 2019 Israeli legislative election campaign, Likud agreed to a deal with Zehut, whereby the latter party would drop out of the election and endorse Likud in exchange for a ministerial post for its leader, Moshe Feiglin, as well as policy concessions.

Prior to the 2020 Israeli legislative election Gideon Sa'ar unsuccessfully challenged Netanyahu for the Likud leadership. In December of that year, Sa'ar left Likud, along with four other Likud MKs, to form New Hope.

Prior to the 2021 Israeli legislative election, Gesher merged into Likud, receiving a slot on its electoral list. 2021 marked the first time that Likud put a Muslim on its slate, choosing Muslim school principal Nail Zoabi for 39th on its slate.

Likud also facilitated the formation of a joint list between the Religious Zionist Party, Otzma Yehudit and Noam by providing the Religious Zionist Party a slot on the Likud list. On 14 June, after the swearing-in of the 36th government, Ofir Sofer who held the slot, split from the Likud faction and returned to the Religious Zionist Party, decreasing the Likud faction by one to 29 seats in the Knesset.

Likud won the most seats in the 2022 Israeli legislative election.

=== 2026 election ===
The party won 27 seats in the 2026 Israeli legislative election.

== Ideological positions ==
Likud emphasizes national security policy based on a strong military force when threatened with continued enmity against Israel. It has shown reluctance to negotiate with its neighbors whom it believes continue to seek the destruction of the Jewish state, that based on the principle of the party founder Menachem Begin concerning the preventive policy to any potential attacks on State of Israel. Its suspicion of neighboring Arab nations' intentions, however, has not prevented the party from reaching agreements with Israel's neighbors, such as the 1979 peace treaty with Egypt. Likud's willingness to enter mutually accepted agreements with neighboring countries over the years is related to the formation of other right-wing parties. Like other right-wing parties in Israel, Likud politicians have sometimes criticized particular Supreme Court decisions, but it remains committed to rule of law principles that it hopes to entrench in a written constitution.

As of 2014, the party remains divided between moderates and hard-liners.

Likud is considered to be the leading party in the national camp in Israeli politics.

=== Territory ===
The original 1977 party platform stated that "between the Sea and the Jordan there will only be Israeli sovereignty."

The 1999 Likud Party platform emphasized the right of settlement:

The Jewish communities in Judea, Samaria, and Gaza are the realization of Zionist values. Settlement of the land is a clear expression of the unassailable right of the Jewish people to the Land of Israel and constitutes an important asset in the defense of the vital interests of the State of Israel. The Likud will continue to strengthen and develop these communities and will prevent their uprooting.

Similarly, they claim the Jordan River as the permanent eastern border to Israel and it also claims Jerusalem as belonging to Israel.

The 'Peace & Security' chapter of the 1999 Likud Party platform rejects a Palestinian state:

The Government of Israel flatly rejects the establishment of a Palestinian Arab state west of the Jordan river. The Palestinians can run their lives freely in the framework of self-rule, but not as an independent and sovereign state. Thus, for example, in matters of foreign affairs, security, immigration, and ecology, their activity shall be limited in accordance with imperatives of Israel's existence, security and national needs.

With Likud back in power, starting in 2009, Israeli foreign policy is still under review. Likud leader Benjamin Netanyahu, in his "National Security" platform, neither endorsed nor ruled out the idea of a Palestinian state. According to Time, "Netanyahu has hinted that he does not oppose the creation of a Palestinian state, but aides say he must move cautiously because his religious-nationalist coalition partners refuse to give away land."

On 14 June 2009, Netanyahu delivered a speech at Bar-Ilan University (also known as "Bar-Ilan Speech"), at Begin-Sadat Center for Strategic Studies, that was broadcast live in Israel and across parts of the Arab world, on the topic of the Middle East peace process. He endorsed for the first time the creation of a Palestinian state alongside Israel, with several conditions.

However, on 16 March 2015, Netanyahu stated in the affirmative, that if he were elected, a Palestinian state would not be created. Netanyahu argued, "anyone who goes to create today a Palestinian state and turns over land, is turning over land that will be used as a launching ground for attacks by Islamist extremists against the State of Israel." Some take these statements to mean that Netanyahu and Likud oppose a Palestinian state. After having been criticised by U.S. White House Spokesperson Josh Earnest for the "divisive rhetoric" of his election campaign, on 19 March 2015, Netanyahu retreated to "I don't want a one-state solution. I want a peaceful, sustainable two-state solution. I have not changed my policy."

The Likud Constitution of May 2014 is more vague and ambiguous. Though it contains commitments to the strengthening of Jewish settlement in the West Bank, it does not explicitly rule out the establishment of a Palestinian state.

=== Economy ===
The Likud party claims to support a free market capitalist and liberal agenda, though, in practice, it has mostly adopted mixed economic policies. Under the guidance of finance minister and current party leader Benjamin Netanyahu, Likud pushed through legislation reducing value added tax (VAT), income and corporate taxes significantly, as well as customs duty. Likewise, it has instituted free trade (especially with the European Union and the United States) and dismantled certain monopolies (Bezeq and the seaports). Additionally, it has privatized numerous government-owned companies (e.g. El Al and Bank Leumi), and has moved to privatize land in Israel, which until now has been held symbolically by the state in the name of the Jewish people. Netanyahu was the most ardent free-market Israeli finance minister to date. He argued that Israel's largest labor union, the Histadrut, has so much power as to be capable of paralyzing the Israeli economy, and claimed that the main causes of unemployment are laziness and excessive benefits to the unemployed. Under Netanyahu, Likud has and is likely to maintain a comparatively fiscally conservative economic stance. However, the party's economic policies vary widely among members, with some Likud MKs supporting more leftist economic positions that are more in line with popular preferences.

=== Palestinians ===
Likud has historically espoused opposition to Palestinian statehood and support of Israeli settlements in the West Bank and Gaza Strip. However, it has also been the party that carried out the first peace agreements with Arab states. For instance, in 1979, Likud prime minister Menachem Begin signed the Camp David Accords with Egyptian President Anwar al-Sadat, which returned the Sinai Peninsula (occupied by Israel in the Six-Day War of 1967) to Egypt in return for peace between the two countries. Yitzhak Shamir was the first Israeli prime minister to meet Palestinian leaders at the Madrid Conference following the Persian Gulf War in 1991. However, Shamir refused to concede the idea of a Palestinian state, and as a result was blamed by some (including James Baker, then United States Secretary of State) for the failure of the summit. On 14 June 2009, as Prime Minister Netanyahu gave a speech at Bar-Ilan University in which he endorsed a "Demilitarized Palestinian State", though said that Jerusalem must remain the unified capital of Israel.

In 2002, during the Second Intifada, Israel's Likud-led government reoccupied Palestinian towns and refugee camps in the West Bank. In 2005 Ariel Sharon defied the recent tendencies of Likud and abandoned the policy of seeking to settle in the West Bank and Gaza. Though re-elected Prime Minister on a platform of no unilateral withdrawals, Sharon carried out the Gaza disengagement plan, withdrawing from the Gaza Strip, as well as four settlements in the northern West Bank. Though losing a referendum among Likud registered voters, Sharon achieved government approval of this policy by firing most of the cabinet members who opposed the plan before the vote.

Sharon and the faction who supported his disengagement proposals left the Likud party after the disengagement and created the new Kadima party. This new party supported unilateral disengagement from most of the West Bank and the fixing of borders by the Israeli West Bank barrier. The basic premise of the policy was that the Israelis have no viable negotiating partner on the Palestinian side, and since they cannot remain in indefinite occupation of the West Bank and Gaza, Israel should unilaterally withdraw.

Netanyahu, who was elected as the new leader of Likud after Kadima's creation, and Silvan Shalom, the runner-up, both supported the disengagement plan; however, Netanyahu resigned his ministerial post before the plan was executed. As of 2018, most Likud members supported the Jewish settlements in the West Bank and opposed Palestinian statehood and the disengagement from Gaza.

Anyone who wants to thwart the establishment of a Palestinian state has to support bolstering Hamas and transferring money to Hamas. This is part of our strategy – to isolate the Palestinians in Gaza from the Palestinians in the West Bank.

— Benjamin Netanyahu, 2019

Although settlement activity has continued under recent Likud governments, much of the activity outside the major settlement blocs has been to accommodate the Jewish Home, a coalition partner; support within Likud to build outside the blocs is not particularly strong.

Likud, under Netanyahu, is alleged to have intentionally propped up the rule of Hamas in Gaza as a means of dividing the Palestinians politically and using Palestinian extremism drawing the peace process away from a two-state solution.

In the 2019 elections Likud was widely criticized as a "racist party" after scaremongering anti-Arab rhetoric by its members as well as Netanyahu who claimed minority Arabs and Palestinians in Israel as "threats" and "enemies".

=== Culture ===
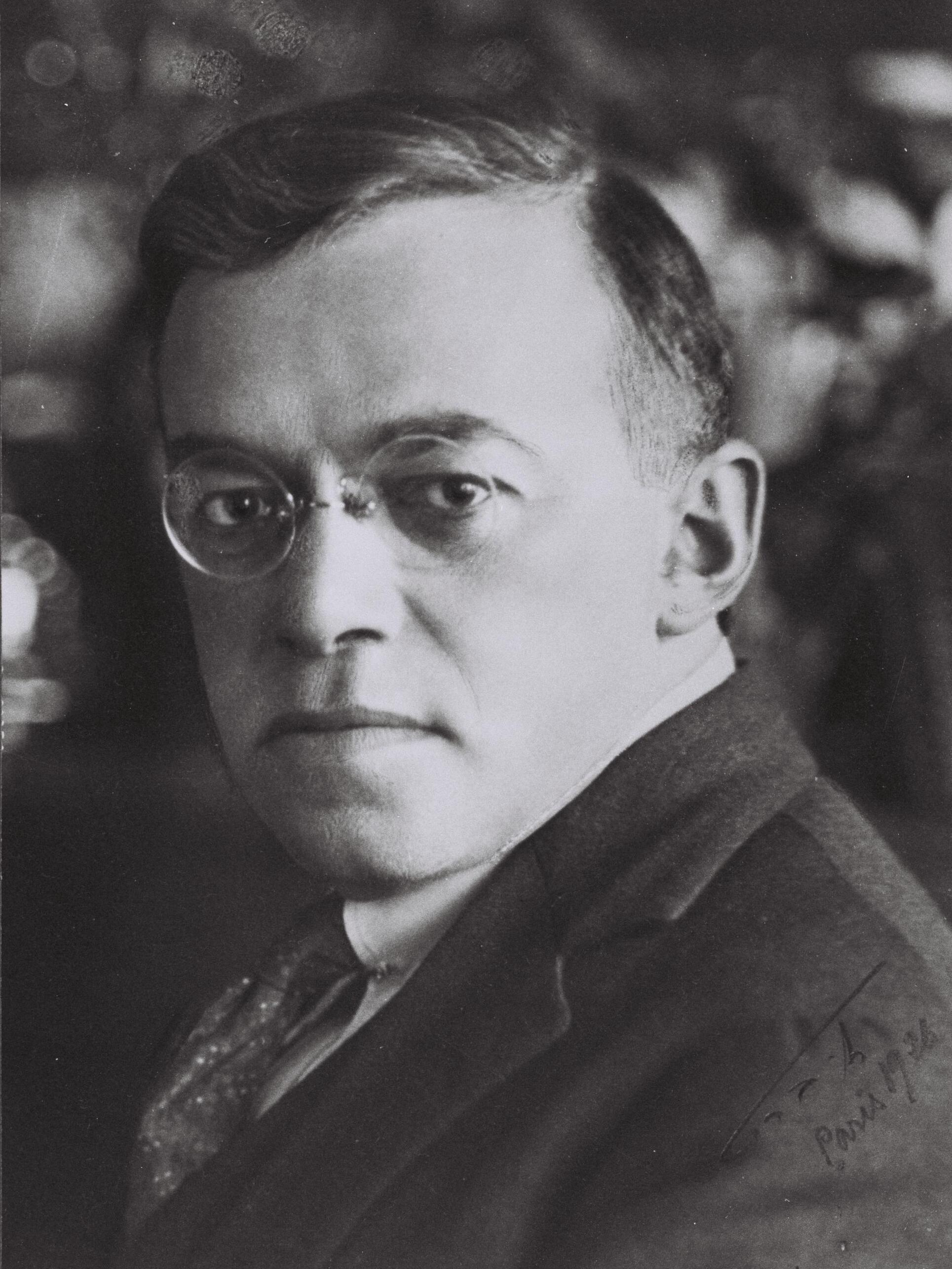
Ze'ev Jabotinsky, a Revisionist Zionist leader

Likud generally advocates free enterprise and nationalism, but it has sometimes compromised these ideals in practice, especially as its constituency has changed. Its support for populist economic programs are at odds with its free enterprise tradition, but are meant to serve its largely nationalistic, lower-income voters in small towns and urban neighborhoods.

On religion and state, Likud has a moderate stance, and supports the preservation of status quo. With time, the party has played into the traditional sympathies of its voter base, though the origins and ideology of Likud are secular. Religious parties have come to view it as a more comfortable coalition partner than Labor.

Likud promotes a revival of Jewish culture, in keeping with the principles of Revisionist Zionism. Likud emphasizes such Israeli nationalist themes as the use of the Israeli flag and the victory in the 1948 Arab–Israeli War. In July 2018, Likud lawmakers voted a controversial Nation-State bill into law which declares Israel as the "nation-state of the Jewish people".

Likud publicly endorses press freedom and promotion of private sector media, which has grown markedly under governments Likud has led. A Likud government headed by Ariel Sharon, however, closed the popular right-wing pirate radio station Arutz Sheva ("Channel 7"). Arutz Sheva was popular with the Jewish settler movement and often criticised the government from a right-wing perspective.

Historically, the Likud and its pre-1948 predecessor, the Revisionist movement advocated secular nationalism. However, the Likud's first prime minister and long-time leader Menachem Begin, though secular himself, cultivated a warm attitude to Jewish tradition and appreciation for traditionally religious Jews—especially from North Africa and the Middle East. This segment of the Israeli population first brought the Likud to power in 1977. Many Orthodox Israelis find the Likud a more congenial party than any other mainstream party, and in recent years also a large group of Haredim, mostly modern Haredim, joined the party and established the Haredi faction in the Likud.

=== Foreign policy ===
Since the 1990s, Likud has advocated a hardline stance against Iran and its proxy militias such as the Lebanese Hezbollah.

Likud prime ministers Ariel Sharon and Benjamin Netanyahu have typically pursued improved relations with Russia, with Likud using posters of Netanyahu meeting Russian president Vladimir Putin during its September 2019 Israeli legislative election campaign. However, since the 2022 Russian invasion of Ukraine, Likud has been divided, with party leader Netanyahu seeking to maintain working relations with Russia and avoid involvement in the conflict, while some MKs, such as Nir Barkat and Yuli Edelstein, have advocated closer alignment with the West against Russia and support for Ukraine in the Russo-Ukrainian war.

The Likud government during the 2010s advocated closer ties with Japan, China and India, in order to reduce Israel's dependency on Western Europe. In 2017 Netanyahu described closer Israeli alignment with China as a "marriage made in heaven". Likud has also maintained connections with the ruling political party in India, the Bharatiya Janata Party.

Likud governments have pursued close ties with the Republican Party in the United States, leading to a perception of preference for the Republicans over the rival Democratic Party. In 2015 Netanyahu delivered an address to the Republican-held United States Congress without consulting the Democratic presidential administration at the time.

The NATO bombing of Yugoslavia in 1999 drew criticism from the Likud foreign minister Ariel Sharon, who described it as "brutal interventionism". Relations between Serbia and Israel improved during the Netanyahu-led Likud government of the 2010s. Likud has had long-term political ties to the Hungarian ruling party Fidesz, which has led to warm diplomatic relations between Netanyahu's Likud governments and the Hungarian governments of Viktor Orbán.

In recent years, Likud has cultivated ties with European right-wing populist political parties, including the Spanish Vox, the Italian Lega, the Portuguese Chega, the Dutch Party for Freedom, the French National Rally, the Sweden Democrats, the Danish People's Party, the Alliance for the Union of Romanians and the Belgian Vlaams Belang.

== Composition (1973–1988) ==
Name	Ideology	Position	Leader
Herut (1973–1988)	Revisionist Zionism; National conservatism	Right-wing to far-right	Menachem Begin (1949–1983); Yitzhak Shamir (1983–1988)
Liberal (1973–1988)	Liberalism (Israeli); Liberal Zionism	Centre-right	Elimelekh Rimalt (1972–1975); Simcha Erlich (1976–1983); Pinchas Goldstein (1983–1988)
National List (1973–1976; 1981)	Zionism; Social liberalism	Centre	Yigal Hurvitz (1970–1976); Yitzhak Peretz (1981)
Free Centre (1973–1977)	Zionism; Liberal conservatism	Right-wing	Shmuel Tamir (1967–1977)
Independent Centre (1975–76)	Zionism; Liberal conservatism	Right-wing	Eliezer Shostak (1975–76)
Movement for Greater Israel (1973–1976)	Neo-Zionism; Greater Israel	Far-right	Avraham Yoffe (1967–1976)
La'am (1976–1984)	Zionism; Conservatism	Right-wing	Yigal Hurvitz (1976–1984); Eliezer Shostak (1976–1984)

== Leaders ==
Leader		Took office	Left office	Prime Ministerial tenure	Knesset elections	Elected/reelected as leader
1	Menachem Begin	1973	1983	1977–1983	1977, 1981	
2	Yitzhak Shamir	1983	1993	1983–1984, 1986–1992	1984, 1988, 1992	1983, 1984, and 1992
3	Benjamin Netanyahu	1993	1999	1996–1999	1996, 1999	1993, and 1999 (Jan)
4	Ariel Sharon	1999	2005	2001–2006	2001, 2003	1999 (Sep) and 2002
(3)	Benjamin Netanyahu	2005	Incumbent	2009–2021, 2022–	2006, 2009, 2013, 2015, Apr 2019, Sep 2019, 2020, 2021, 2022	2005 2007 2012, 2014, and 2019

=== Leader election process ===
During Begin's tenure as leader of Herut/Likud, his leadership was effectively unchallenged. From 1983 through 1992, Herut/Likud elected its party leaders through votes held in party agencies. The 1983 and 1984 Herut leadership elections were undertaken through a vote of Herut's Central Committee. The day after Yitzhak Shamir won the 1983 secret ballot vote of the Herut Central Committee to obtain Herut's party leadership, the party leaders of the other Likud coalition member parties announced that they agreed to have Shamir lead the Likud coalition.

The 1992 Likud leadership election was the first held after Likud became a unified party. The 1992 leadership election was held as a vote of the Likud Central Committee. After 1992, the party moved to electing its leaders through votes of its general membership, with the first such vote taking place in 1993.

=== Party list selection process ===
Prior to the 2006 election, the Likud's Central Committee relinquished control of selecting the Knesset list to the "rank and file" members at Netanyahu's behest. The aim was to improve the party's reputation, as the central committee had gained a reputation for corruption.

== Current MKs ==
Likud currently has 27 Knesset members. They are listed below in the order that they appeared on the party's list for the 2026 elections.

1. Benjamin Netanyahu
2. Eli Cohen
3. Amir Ohana
4. Yariv Levin
5. Miri Regev
6. Israel Katz
7. Gideon Sa'ar
8. Ofir Katz
9. Tali Gvili
10. Yoav Kisch
11. Yaakov Bardugo
12. Miki Zohar
13. Almog Cohen
14. Amichai Chikli
15. Elisha Medan
16. David Peter
17. Moshe Saada
18. Haim Katz
19. Dudi Amsalem
20. Eti Atiya
21. Boaz Bismuth
22. David Bitan
23. Shlomo Karhi
24. Nir Barkat
25. Gila Gamliel
26. Eli Goldschmidt
27. Erez Tadmor

== Party organs ==
=== Likud Executive ===
- Director General of the Likud: Zuri Siso
- Deputy DG, head of the Municipal Division, head of the Computer Division: Zuri Siso
- Manager of the Likud Chairman's Office: Hanni Blaivais
- Director of Foreign Affairs and Likud spokesperson: Eli Hazan

=== Likud Central Committee ===
The Central Committee decides on all matters between party conferences, with the exceptions of matters designated to another organ. As of 2022, the chairman of the Central Committee is Haim Katz.

The Central Committee has a considerable number of members. For example, in one vote, 3,050 members took part in 2005.

=== Likud Secretariat ===
The secretariat is the body that elects the director general of the part and the heads various departments. It defines their powers and supervises their activities. As of 2022 the chairman of the secretariat is Haim Katz.

=== Likud Court ===
The Court is the supreme judicial organ in all matters of the party.

=== Legal Advisor ===
The Legal Advisor advises the party and its bodies in the matters of the state law and the Party constitution and represents the party before external authorities. The Legal Advisor has a significant power and may overturn the decisions of most of the party bodies, including the Central Committee. As of 2022 the Legal Advisor of the Likud Movement is Avi Halevy.

=== Likud Youth Movement ===
The Likud Youth Movement (Noar HaLikud, lit. 'Likud Youth', sometimes called 'Young Likud'), is the official body in charge of all young members of Likud. It is a member group of the International Young Democrat Union.

== Election results ==
=== Knesset ===
Election	Leader	Votes	%	Seats	+/−	Status
1973	Menachem Begin	473,309	30.2 (#2)	39 / 120	▲7	Opposition
1977 (Note: Both members of Shlomtzion joined the party, giving it 45 seats.)	Menachem Begin	583,968	33.4 (#1)	43 / 120	▲4	Coalition
1981	Menachem Begin	718,941	37.1 (#1)	48 / 120	▲3	Coalition (1981–1983)
1981	Menachem Begin	718,941	37.1 (#1)	48 / 120	▲3	Coalition (1983–1984)
1984	Yitzhak Shamir	661,302	31.9 (#2)	41 / 120	▼7	Coalition (1984–1986)
1984	Yitzhak Shamir	661,302	31.9 (#2)	41 / 120	▼7	Coalition (1986–1988)
1988	Yitzhak Shamir	709,305	31.1 (#1)	40 / 120	▼1	Coalition (1988–1990)
1988	Yitzhak Shamir	709,305	31.1 (#1)	40 / 120	▼1	Coalition (1990–1992)
1992	Yitzhak Shamir	651,229	24.9 (#2)	32 / 120	▼8	Opposition (1992–1995)
1992	Yitzhak Shamir	651,229	24.9 (#2)	32 / 120	▼8	Opposition (1995–1996)
1996 (Note: Run in coalition with Gesher and Tzomet.)	Benjamin Netanyahu	767,401	25.1 (#2)	24 / 120	▼10	Coalition (2001–2003)
1999	Benjamin Netanyahu	468,103	14.1 (#2)	19 / 120	▼3	Opposition (1999–2001)
1999	Benjamin Netanyahu	468,103	14.1 (#2)	19 / 120	▼3	Coalition (1996–1999)
2003	Ariel Sharon	925,279	29.4 (#1)	38 / 120	▲19	Coalition (2003–2006)
2003	Ariel Sharon	925,279	29.4 (#1)	38 / 120	▲19	Opposition (2006)
2006	Benjamin Netanyahu	281,996	9.0 (#4)	12 / 120	▼26	Opposition
2009	Benjamin Netanyahu	729,054	21.6 (#2)	27 / 120	▲15	Coalition
2013 (Note: Run in coalition with Yisrael Beiteinu.)	Benjamin Netanyahu	884,631	23.3 (#1)	20 / 120	▼7	Coalition
2015	Benjamin Netanyahu	984,966	23.4 (#1)	30 / 120	▲12	Coalition
Apr 2019	Benjamin Netanyahu	1,138,772	26.5 (#1)	35 / 120	▲5	Caretaker
Sep 2019	Benjamin Netanyahu	1,113,617	25.1 (#2)	32 / 120	▼4	Caretaker
2020	Benjamin Netanyahu	1,349,171	29.5 (#1)	36 / 120	▲4	Coalition
2021	Benjamin Netanyahu	1,066,892	24.2 (#1)	30 / 120	▼6	Opposition
2022	Benjamin Netanyahu	1,115,049	23.4 (#1)	32 / 120	▲2	Coalition
2026	Benjamin Netanyahu	1,167,591	20.5 (#1)	27 / 120	▼5	TBA

=== Prime minister ===
Election	Candidate	Votes	%	Result
1996	Benjamin Netanyahu	1,501,023	50.5 (#1)	Won
1999	Benjamin Netanyahu	1,402,474	43.9 (#2)	Lost
2001	Ariel Sharon	1,698,077	62.4 (#1)	Won

== See also ==
- List of Likud Knesset Members
