= Free Centre =

Free Centre המרכז החופשי
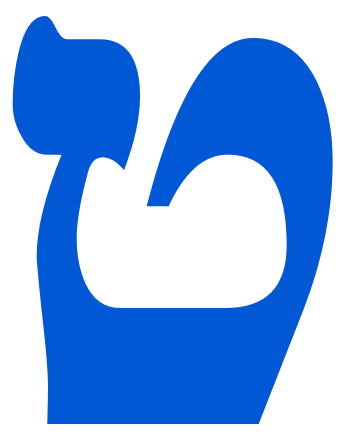
- Leader: Shmuel Tamir
- Founded: 29 March 1967
- Dissolved: 1977
- Split from: Herut
- Merged into: Democratic Movement for Change
- Alliance: Likud (1973–1976)
- Most MKs: 4 (1969, 1973–1974)
- Fewest MKs: 2 (1969–1973, 1974–1977)

Election symbol
- ט

The Free Centre (Hebrew: המרכז החופשי, HaMerkaz HaHofshi) was a political party in Israel. It is one of the forerunners of the modern-day Likud.

== History ==
The party was created on 29 March 1967 during the sixth Knesset when Shmuel Tamir led a breakaway of three Herut members (the other two being Eliezer Shostak and Avraham Tiar) after a leadership dispute with Menachem Begin. Before the next election they were joined by Shlomo Cohen-Tzidon who had also left Gahal and failed in an attempt to create a one-man parliamentary group named the Popular Faction.

In the 1969 elections the Free Centre only just passed the electoral threshold of 1%, receiving 1.2% of the vote and winning two seats, which were taken by Tamir and Shostak.

Before the 1973 elections it joined the Likud alliance formed by Herut, the Liberal Party (which had formerly been allied as Gahal), the National List and the Movement for Greater Israel. The new alliance won 39 seats, with four taken by the Free Centre; Tamir and Shostak were joined by Ehud Olmert and Akiva Nof.

In 1974 internal conflict led to Shostak and Ehud Olmert leaving the Free Centre to establish the Independent Centre, which later merged into the La'am faction. Another dispute led to Tamir and Nof leaving Likud and re-establishing the party as an independent faction on 26 October 1976 during the eighth Knesset. Both resigned from the Knesset on 25 January 1977 and joined the Democratic Movement for Change. They were both elected to the ninth Knesset as members of the new party, though Nof later defected back to Likud after a spell in Ahva.

== Knesset members ==
Knesset	Members
6 (1967–1969); 4 seats	Shlomo Cohen-Tzidon, Eliezer Shostak, Shmuel Tamir, Avraham Tiar
7 (1969–1974); 2 seats	Eliezer Shostak, Shmuel Tamir
8 (1974–1977); 4 seats	Akiva Nof, Ehud Olmert, Eliezer Shostak, Shmuel Tamir
