= Shlomo Cohen-Tzidon =

Israeli politician

Faction represented in the Knesset
- 1966-1969: Gahal
- 1969: Free Centre

Personal details
- Born: 15 February 1923 Alexandria, Egypt
- Died: 16 February 2012 (aged 89)

Shlomo Cohen-Tzidon (Hebrew: שלמה כהן־צידון; 15 February 1923 – 16 February 2012) was an Israeli politician who served as a member of the Knesset for Gahal and the Free Centre between 1966 and 1969.

== Biography ==
Born in Alexandria in Egypt, Cohen-Tzidon attended the Upper Trade school in his home city, and was an activist in the Egyptian branch of the Zionist movement. In 1949 he made aliyah to Israel, where he studied at the School for Jurisprudence and Economics in Tel Aviv, and was certified as a lawyer.

An activist amongst Mizrahi Jews, he published a magazine entitled HaMizrah HaHadash. A one-time member of Mapai, in 1961 he was amongst the founders of the Liberal Party. He was on the Gahal list (an alliance of the Liberal Party and Herut) for the 1965 elections, and although he failed to win a seat, he entered the Knesset on 16 October 1966 as a replacement for the deceased Eliyahu Meridor. On 11 February 1969 he left Gahal, and after trying to establish his own single-member faction named the Popular Faction, joined the Free Centre, which had left Gahal in 1967. He lost his seat in the October 1969 elections when the party was reduced from four to two seats.
