= Neo-Zionism =

Right-wing nationalist and religious ideology

Neo-Zionism (Hebrew: ניאו־ציונות) is a right-wing to far-right, ultranationalist, and religious ideology that appeared in Israel following the Six-Day War in 1967 and the capture of the West Bank and Gaza Strip. Neo-Zionists consider these lands part of Israel and advocate their unlimited settlement by Israeli Jews. Many also support the prohibition of non-Jewish immigration to Israel. Some advocate the transfer of Arabs not only from these areas but also from within the Green Line. Neo-Zionist beliefs are considered settler colonialism.

The term "post-Zionism" entered Israeli discourse following the publishing of a book by Uri Ram in 1993. In the same volume, Gershom Shafir contrasted post-Zionism with what he termed neo-Zionism. In a widely cited 1996 essay, sociologist Uri Ram used the term neo-Zionism to describe a political and religious ideology that developed in Israel following the 1967 Six-Day War. He considers it as an "exclusionary, nationalist, even racist, and antidemocratic political-cultural trend" in Israel, and that it evolved in parallel with, and in opposition to, the left-wing politics of post-Zionism and Labor Zionism.

== Ideology ==
Uri Ram contends that neo-Zionism is not a new phenomenon, instead arguing that it emerged from the Six-Day War in 1967 and the conquest of Jerusalem. Ram contends that Jerusalem is the symbolic capital of neo-Zionism, while post-Zionism is orientated around Tel Aviv. It rose with the anxiety following the near loss of the Yom Kippur War in 1973.

Neo-Zionists consider "secular Zionism", particularly the labor version, as too weak on nationalism and that it never understood the impossibility of Arabs and Jews living together in peace. Neo-Zionists claim that the Arab attitude to Israel is inherently rooted in antisemitism and that it is a Zionist illusion to think living in peace and together with them is possible. They consider Arabs in Israel to be a fifth column and to pose a demographic threat to the Jewish majority in Israel. From their point of view, the only solution for achieving peace is through "deterrence and retaliation" or preferably "transfer by agreement" of the Israeli Arabs and the Palestinian population of the occupied Palestinian territories to neighboring Arab states.

Uri Ram characterizes both neo-Zionism and post-Zionism as reactions to the post-nationalist environment. For neo-Zionism, "the weakness of Israeli Nationalism derives from his alienation of Jewish sources and culture (...). Only a new national-religious and orthodox coalition [could] cure Zionism of this moral bankruptcy". Neo-Zionists consider all areas under Israeli military control to be part of "the biblical Land of Israel". Neo-Zionists assert that the goal of Jewish statehood is not only about creating a safe refuge for Jews but also about the national-historic destiny of the people of Israel in the land of Israel.

For Uri Ram, neo-Zionism is a reinterpretation of Zionism that is religious rather than secular. Judaism, instead of being a peripheral cultural tradition, is a core element in his definition. In Ram's formulation, Post-Zionism is globalist and liberal, while neo-Zionism is local and ethno-religious. Asima Ghazi-Bouillon challenges Ram's classification of neo-Zionism as anti-globalist. He instead sees some strains of neo-Zionism as globalist, similar to neoconservatism and neo-nationalism. Whereas post-Zionism was a largely unsuccessful direct challenge to Zionism, neo-Zionism is instead a challenge to Labor Zionism. Asima Ghazi-Bouillon argues that neo-Zionism is not entirely an ethno-religious movement but also incorporates a national security discourse.

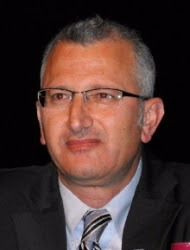
Amal Jamal, a professor of political science at Tel Aviv University, is a leading researcher on neo-Zionism.

Amal Jamal argues that rather than being a distinct movement, neo-Zionism simply represents the exposure of previously veiled or obscured sentiments in classical mainstream Zionism, who have attempted to retain favor with Western democracies by distancing themselves from neo-Zionism, and that neo-Zionism provides an outlet for sentiments too confrontational for centrists to previously openly support. These sentiments include a broad spectrum ranging from purely messianic views of Jewish redemption and a Third Temple to purely strategic views, but broadly include Jewish supremacism as a more advanced and moral culture than other peoples, a sole biblical right to the Land of Israel based on the Torah,, a Volkisch connection within the Jewish race and land of Israel, the view of the territories occupied in 1967 as part of and indistinguishable from the State of Israel created in 1948, and advocacy for settler colonialism seeking to entirely replace Palestinian populations inside Israel and the West Bank with Israeli settlers. He argues that all these sentiments are shared in statements by prominent Zionists, and that disagreement between the Zionist mainstream and neo-Zionism can be interpreted as "quarrels within a family".

Ilan Pappé sees four currents which have contributed to neo-Zionism's rise: The conversion of the Haredim to Zionism; the settler movement combined with the state funding of Yeshivas; the culturally insular and economically deprived Mizrahi community; and finally the integration of Israel into the global capitalist system.

== Representation ==
Uri Ram uses the Movement for Greater Israel and the Gush Emunim settler movement founded in 1974 as examples of neo-Zionism and its precursors, Gush Emunim being a hybrid of religion and nationalism. Ram also labels parts of Likud and the National Religious Party, as well as other, smaller, splinter parties including Yisrael BaAliyah, Moledet, Tehiya and Tzomet as neo-Zionist.

In the media neo-Zionism is associated with Arutz Sheva. According to Yishai Fleisher, Arutz Sheva director of programming and founder of the Kumah neo-Zionist lobby, "Zionism is the yearning of the Jewish people to come back to the land of Israel with the creation of the Jewish commonwealth and the era of the third Temple. It's a renewal of lost values, and an answer to post-Zionism. If post-Zionism is the theory that Israel was created and the project is now finished, then neo-Zionism states that we are far from done with the project. The Jewish people are not yet back home, and we have yet to educate Jews to the concept of living a Torah life in the land of Israel."

Some associations in Israel, such as Im Tirtzu, defend neo-Zionist ideology. Ronen Shoval, founder of the association states that "We need every Jewish heart and Zionist soul. Coordinators and activists of Im Tirtzu are hereby called to the flag. (...) [W]e will turn the Hebrew University into a Zionist society, and continue the second Zionist revolution!" His aims are "to restore Zionism to the center—for poets to poetize Zionism, for the writers to write Zionism, for academia to support Zionism and for the Ari Folmans (...) to make films about our ethos. Just as there are movies about gladiators, we will have movies about Judah Maccabee. What's wrong with that?"

== Critics ==
According to Uri Ram, "Neo-Zionism (...) is an exclusionary, nationalist, even racist, and antidemocratic political-cultural trend, striving to heighten the fence encasing Israeli identity"; a point of view also reported by Gilbert Achcar.

According to Dana Eyal, "[her] country is hijacked by a group of racist religious Jews, who are much more of a threat to Israel than any Arab or Muslim country, including Iran". She gives the example of children of illegal immigrants born and living in Israel for years and that neo-Zionist groups want to see expelled because their presence is un-Zionistic. She thinks that "[t]his very narrow definition of Zionism dictates that Israel is and will remain a racist Jewish state" but also "that in Israel itself there is a (lazy) majority that is far from this. Zionism for us equals patriotism much like it does to Americans; wanting the best for your country, believing in its principals (sic) and defending it when necessary. Only we don't believe in many of the neo-orthodox principals (sic) popping out like mushrooms in the rain. For that matter, we no longer feel very Zionistic in an environment that embraces totality and purity of race (a calamitous similarity to things that should not be named)".

Post-Zionists have argued that Israel must choose between a post-Zionist future and a neo-Zionist future. Today, Israeli centrists have come to view both "Post-Zionism" and "Neo-Zionism" positions as threats to their position.

== See also ==
- New antisemitism
- Political ideology
- Self hating Jew
- Kahanism
- Religious Zionism
- Christian Zionism
- Chardal
- Revisionist Zionism
- Zionist political violence
