= Avraham Yoffe =

Israeli politician and general (1913–1983)

Abraham Yoffe
- אברהם יפה
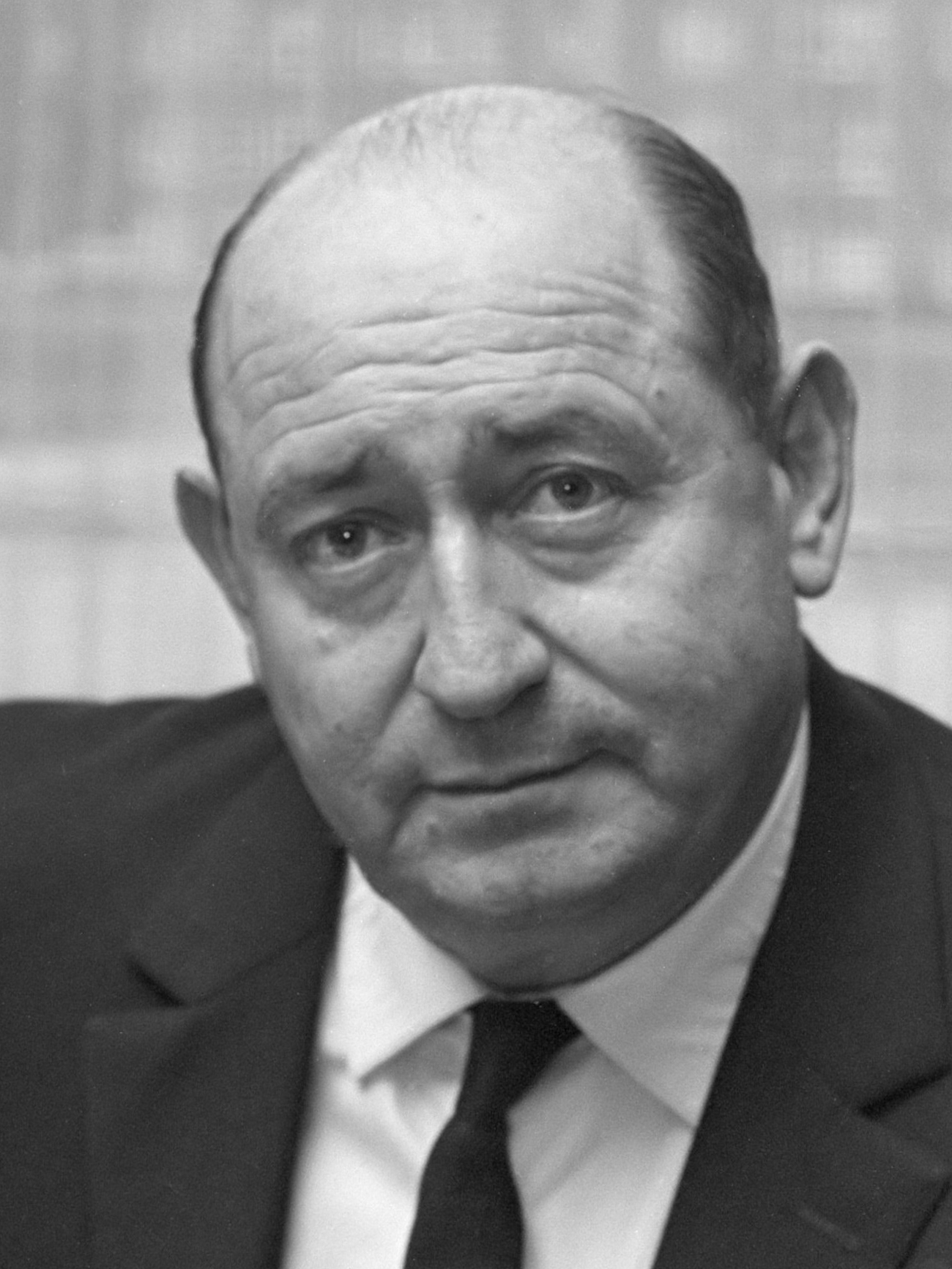
- Yoffe in 1967

Faction represented in the Knesset
- 1974–1977: Likud

Personal details
- Born: October 25, 1913 Yavne'el, Ottoman Empire
- Died: April 11, 1983 (aged 69) Israel

Abraham Yoffe (Hebrew: אברהם יפה, romanized: Avraham Yoffe, October 25, 1913 – April 11, 1983) was an Israeli general during the Six-Day War. He later entered politics and served as a member of the Knesset for Likud between 1974 and 1977.

== Biography ==
Yoffe was born in Yavne'el in 1913, when the Ottoman Empire still controlled Palestine. He was one of four children born to Chaim and Miriam Yoffe. His father was a member of the Yoffe family, and in his early years Avraham Yoffe attended the Mikveh Yisrael agricultural school.

=== Military career ===
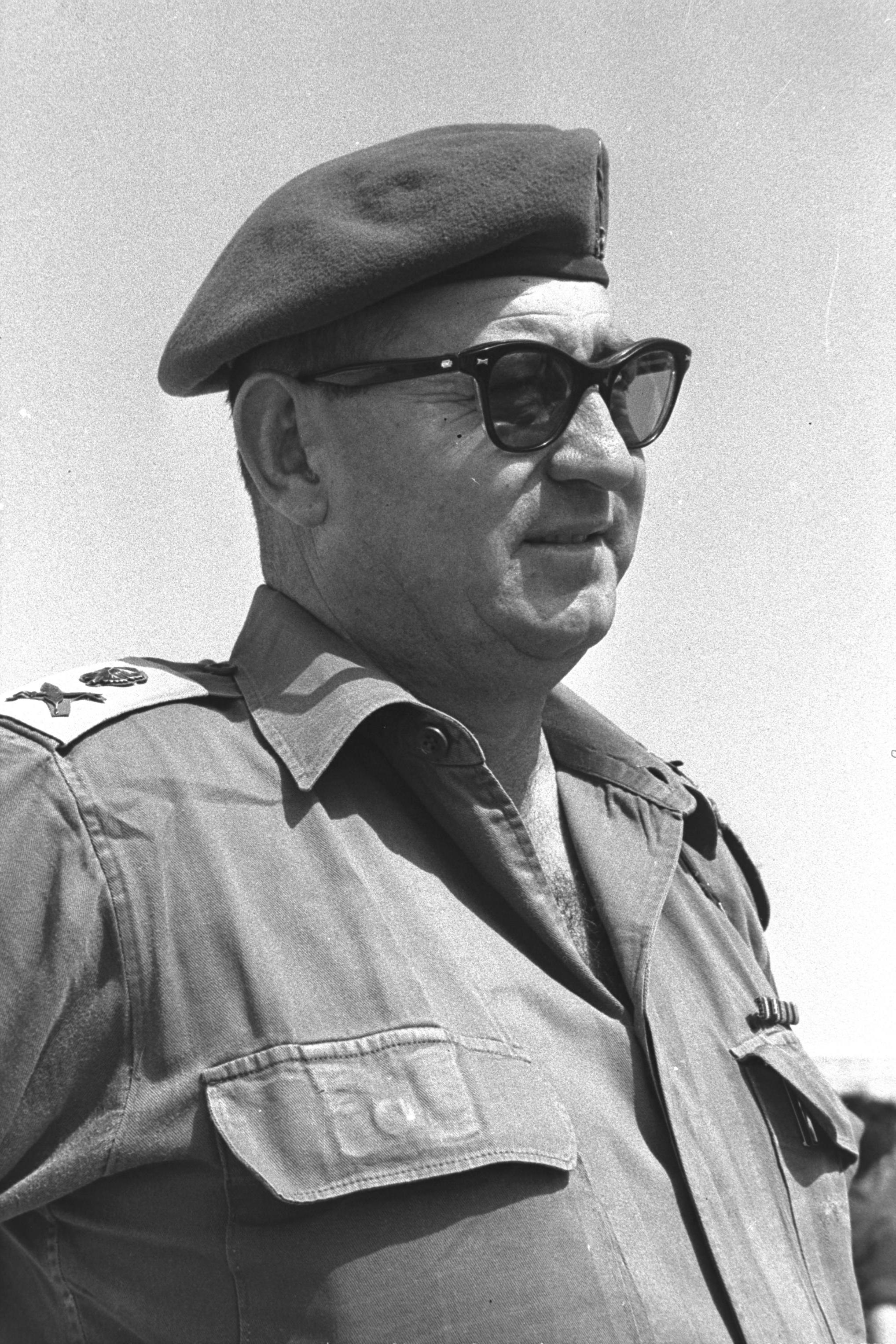
General Avraham Yoffe while being commander of the IDF's Southern Command, 1960

At the age of 16 he joined the Haganah. In 1936, Yoffe joined the Special Night Squads, a joint British-Jewish counter-insurgency unit established by Orde Wingate to combat the 1936–1939 Arab revolt in Palestine. Yoffe served as a squad leader in one of the squads, acting as Lt. Michael Grove's second in command.

During World War II, he served in British Army. He enlisted in 1940, joining an artillery unit, and served in Mandatory Palestine and Cyprus before being assigned to a transport unit in Benghazi. During his service in Palestine and Cyprus, he engaged in arms theft for the Haganah. Yoffe was discharged from the British Army in 1947 with the rank of Captain. He then went to Europe to take part in Mossad LeAliyah Bet operations before returning to his kibbutz to raise geese. In November 1947, he returned to Haganah service.

Yoffe took part in the 1947–1948 civil war in Mandatory Palestine and 1948 Arab–Israeli War, becoming a battalion commander in the Golani Brigade. On May 12, his battalion captured Beisan during Operation Gideon. He was wounded in combat while taking part in Operation Hiram. He remained in the Israel Defense Forces as an officer following the war, becoming a battalion commander in the 8th Armored Brigade before being appointed commander of the Golani Brigade in 1950 and subsequently commander of the Oded Brigade in 1953. Upon the formation of the 36th Division in 1954, Yoffe became its first commander.

During the Suez Crisis, Yoffe led the Oded Brigade on a march into Egypt's southern Sinai to capture Sharm el-Sheikh on November 5, 1956. Between 1957 and 1958, he headed the training department and was commander of the officers' school. In 1958 he was appointed commander of the Southern Command, and in 1962 switched to the Northern Command.

=== Six-Day War ===
After being demobilized in 1964, he was recalled to service during the Six-Day War to command a division (ugdah in Hebrew) in the Southern Command, along with the much younger generals Israel Tal and Ariel Sharon.

According to Michael Oren: "Though fifty-three years old and paunchy, the director of Israel's Nature Protection Society, Avraham Yoffe, was a seasoned fighter in Sinai. In 1956, he had led an infantry column down the peninsula's eastern coast to capture Sharm al-Sheikh. Later, as head of the Southern Command, he developed contingency plans for moving tanks over desert wastes that were widely believed insurmountable. Summoned a few weeks before the war by Gen. Gavish, Yoffe had arrived at camp in civilian clothes, thinking he was making a courtesy call. He returned in a brigadier general's uniform and took charge of the 31st Ugdah with its two reserve brigades, each with 100 tanks. His assignment was to penetrate Sinai south of Tal's forces and north of Sharon's, dividing the two fronts and preventing enemy reinforcements from reaching either. Then, dashing eastward, he would attack Egypt's second line of defence while its first was still busy fighting."

He thus commanded a troop division in Egypt during the attack on the Sinai Peninsula through Wadi Haroudin, a sand dunes area thought to be impassable to the Israeli tanks. His army captured the Bir-Lafhan junction, effectively preventing the Egyptians from calling in reinforcements.

Avraham Yoffe and his four brigades on the Egyptian front avoided any areas of heavy enemy concentration and rushed to the passes; in fact, he traversed unguarded terrain because the Egyptians believed that tanks could not cross over dunes. Then, General Israel Tal's elite tank division and General Sharon would follow behind, forcing the Egyptians back into a deathtrap that was guaranteed to wipe out the third of their army that resided in the Sinai. The basis of the plan was for Yoffe to attack the Egyptians from the flank and drive them to retreat into the Mitla Pass, where Sharon and Tal would wipe them out.

As was seen through the first four days of the war, when Israel and Egypt were locked in combat, this plan succeeded beyond expectations, forcing the Egyptian retreat. On the eve of the first day of fighting, after intense battles, Tal's forces reached El-Arish and Sharon's division prevailed in the most important encounter in north Sinai in the Battle of Abu-Ageila. Meanwhile, Yoffe's division advanced on the Egyptian defences and captured the Bir-Lafhan junction. By the end of the first day, part of Tal's division headed north to the Gaza Strip, and by June 7, the IDF captured Gaza City.

On the fourth day of the war, June 8, 1967, the Egyptian forces were defeated. General Tal's division conquered Qantara on the banks of the Suez Canal, continuing south along the canal to join up with the main force of the division, which continued from Bir Gifgafa to the Suez Canal in the Ismailiya sector. South of them, General Yoffe's division also continued towards the canal along two axes in the Suez sector. Meanwhile, another force of his division continued on another route to Ras-Sudar on the Gulf of Suez, south of the canal. From there, the force continued south along the Gulf of Suez and reached Abu-Zenima, where it met up with the paratroopers coming from Et-Tur.

=== Scientific activities ===
General Yoffe had an important role in the discovery of a Bar Kokhba letter in a cave in the Judaean Desert. He participated in the archaeological exploration with Yigael Yadin in a cave earlier plundered by Bedouin and researched by another archaeological team. Yoffe suggested using advanced military equipment, which resulted in buried artifacts being discovered. That find is among the most important for the study of the Bar Kokhba revolt against the Romans.

In 1963, while on military duty, Avraham Yoffe was permitted to serve as a chairman of the newly created Nature Reserves Authority Council. In November 1964, he retired from the military, and in May 1965, he was appointed director of the Nature Reserves Authority, where he served for 14 years, before being replaced by Adir Shapira in 1978.

=== Political career ===
Yoffe was one of the founders of the Movement for Greater Israel, and as the organization merged into the Likud, he subsequently joined that party. He was elected to the Knesset on the Likud list in 1973 and was a member of the influential Foreign Affairs and Defense Committee and Finance Committee. During the 1977 Israeli legislative election, he announced he would not run for the seat.
