= Movement for Greater Israel =

Movement for Greater Israel התנועה למען ארץ ישראל השלמה
- Leader: Avraham Yoffe
- Founded: July 1967; 59 years ago
- Dissolved: 1976; 50 years ago
- Merged into: La'am
- Ideology: Greater Israel; Neo-Zionism; Anti-Arabism; Ethnocracy; Jewish supremacy
- Political position: Far-right
- Alliance: Likud (1973–1976)
- Most MKs: 1 (1973–1976)
- Fewest MKs: 0 (1969–1973)

Election symbol
- כן

The Movement for Greater Israel (Hebrew: התנועה למען ארץ ישראל השלמה, romanized: HaTnu'a Lema'an Eretz Yisrael HaSheleima), also known as the Land of Israel Movement, was a ultranationalist political organisation in Israel during the 1960s and 1970s which subscribed to an ideology of Greater Israel.

The organisation was formed in July 1967, a month after Israel captured the Gaza Strip, the Sinai Peninsula, the West Bank, and the Golan Heights in the Six-Day War. It called on the Israeli government to keep the captured areas and to settle them with Jewish populations. Its founders were a mixture of Labor Zionists, Revisionists, writers and poets, including Nathan Alterman, Aharon Amir, Haim Gouri, Rachel Yanait Ben-Zvi, Yitzhak Tabenkin, Yitzhak Zuckerman, Zivia Lubetkin, Eliezer Livneh, Moshe Shamir, Shmuel Katz, Zev Vilnay, Uri Zvi Greenberg, Shmuel Yosef Agnon, Isser Harel, Israel Eldad, Dan Tolkovsky and Avraham Yoffe.

In the 1969 Knesset elections it ran as the "List for the Land of Israel", but earned only 7,561 votes (0.6%), and failed to cross the electoral threshold of 1%. Prior to the 1973 elections, it joined the Likud, an alliance of Herut, the Liberal Party, the Free Centre and the National List. Likud won 39 seats, of which one was allocated to the Movement for Greater Israel, and taken by Avraham Yoffe.

In 1976 it merged with the National List and the Independent Centre (a breakaway from the Free Centre) to form La'am, which remained a faction within Likud until its merger into Herut in 1984. Two of its members, Moshe Shamir and Zvi Shiloah, later became Knesset members for Likud and Tehiya.
