= September 1999 Likud leadership election =

Likud leadership election

- 2 September 1999
- Turnout: 34.8%
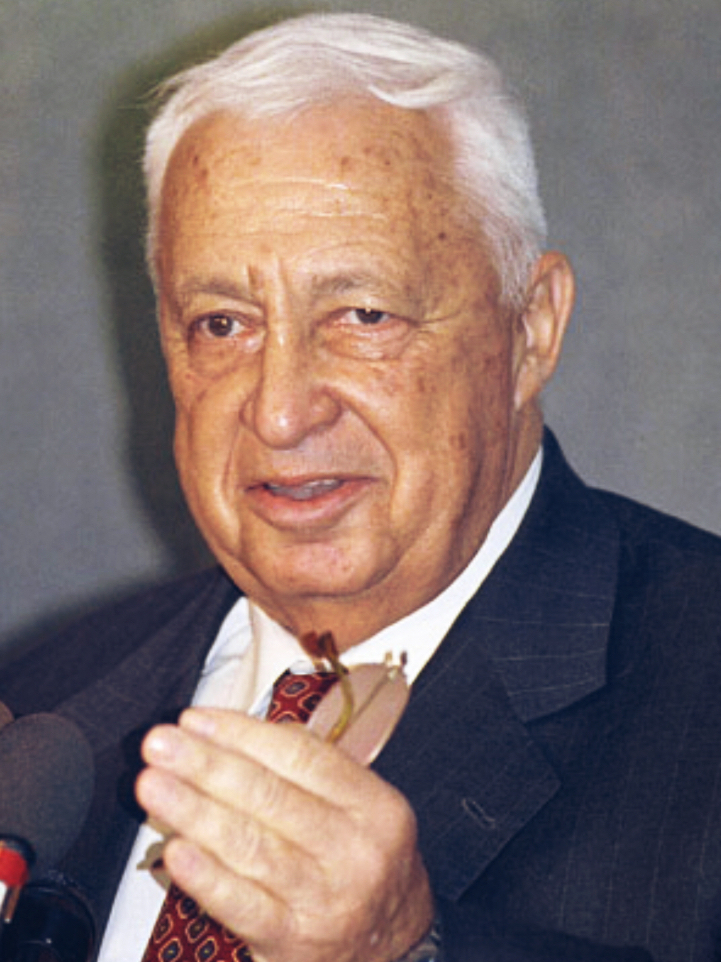

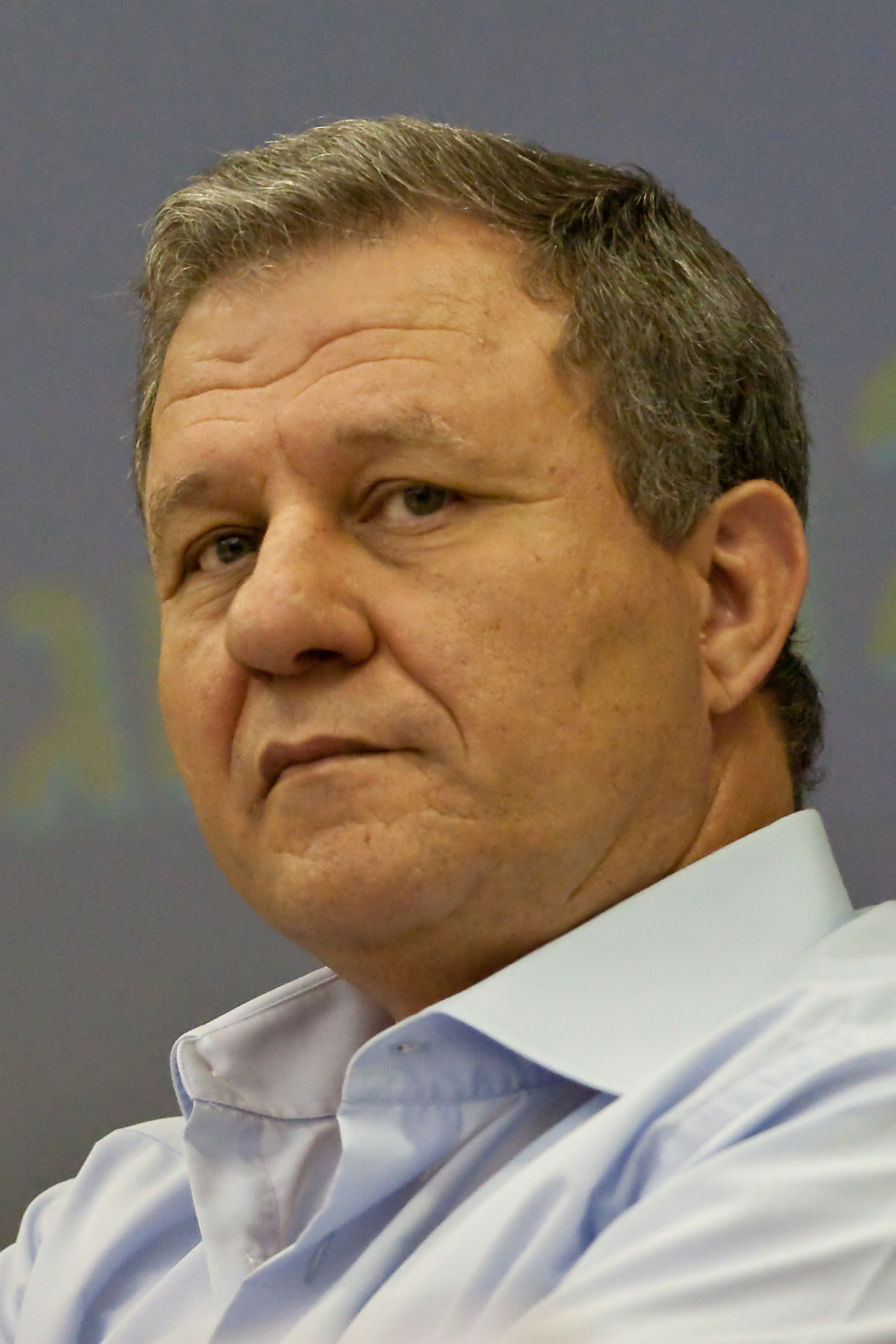
Candidate	Ariel Sharon	Ehud Olmert	Meir Shitrit
Percentage	53%	24%	24%
Leader before election
Ariel Sharon (interim)
Elected Leader
Ariel Sharon

The September 1999 Likud leadership election was held on 2 September 1999 to elect the leader of the Likud party. Ariel Sharon was elected to permanently replace former leader Benjamin Netanyahu. Sharon had been serving as interim leader since Netanyahu resigned following the party's defeat in the 1999 Israeli general election.

== Background ==
The leadership election to elect a new Likud leader took place after Israeli Labor Party leader Ehud Barak heavily defeated Likud leader Benjamin Netanyahu in the 1999 Israeli general election. After the election defeat, Netanyahu resigned as party leader and Ariel Sharon acted as interim party leader.

== Candidates ==
- Ehud Olmert, mayor of Jerusalem since 1993
- Ariel Sharon, former minister of defense (1981–1983), former minister of energy (1996–1999), former minister of industry and trade (1984–1990), former minister of housing and construction (1990–1993), former Minister of Agriculture and Rural Development (1977–1981), member of the Knesset since 1974, former general
- Meir Sheetrit, minister of finance since 1998; member of the Knesset (1981–1988, and since 1992)

== Electorate ==
The leadership election was open to the party's general membership, which, at the time, numbered at 143,871. Only roughly one-third of the eligible electorate participated in the vote.

== Result ==
Sharon won the election, becoming the party's new leader and the new leader of the opposition in the Knesset. Due to his advanced age, some saw Sharon as a likely transitional leader, likely to serve only for a short time before stepping aside. But Sharon gave no indication of this being the case.

September 1999 Likud leadership election
Candidate	Votes	%
Ariel Sharon		53
Ehud Olmert		24
Meir Shitrit		22
Turnout		34.8%

== Spending violation inquiries into Sharon ==
Sharon would face three official inquiries into potential violations of campaign spending limits in his 1999 leadership campaign.
