= Ran Gvili =

Israeli soldier (1999–2023)

- Born: 11 February 1999
- Died: 7 October 2023 (aged 24)
- Burial place: Meitar Cemetery, Israel
- Military career
- Branch: Israel police
- Rank: First Sergeant / Master Sergeant (police commended rank)
- Commands: • Combat soldier, Golani brigade • Combat officer, Negev Yesam unit
- Known for: the Gaza war hostage crisis

Ran (Rani) Gvili (Hebrew: רן גואילי) was a combat officer in the Negev Yesam unit of the Israel Police. He was killed in battle near Kibbutz Alumim during the 7 October attacks, and his body was abducted to the Gaza Strip by Hamas militants during the Hamas-led assault.

In January 2026, his body was located in Gaza during IDF Operation “Brave Heart” and returned to Israel. He was the last hostage to be returned during the Gaza War.

== Early life ==
Gvili was born in 1999 as the middle of three children to Itzik and Talik Gvili. He enlisted in the Golani Brigade and later joined the Israel Police, serving as a combat officer in the Negev Yesam unit.

== Abduction and death ==
On 7 October 2023, during the Hamas attack on southern Israel, Gvili was at his home in Meitar on medical leave, recovering from a broken shoulder sustained in an off-road motorcycle accident two weeks earlier. Despite being scheduled for surgery only two days later, following reports of the Hamas-led attack, he put on his military uniform and protective vest, citing a commitment not to leave his fellow personnel to fight without him. He was reported to have drove towards the Beersheba police station to equip himself before continuing toward the Gaza border communities. Upon reaching the area, Gvily joined Lt. Col. Guy Madar, and together they engaged in combat near Kibbutz Alumim. The two operated at a gas station at the Sa'ad Junction, where they worked under heavy fire to rescue and evacuate dozens of survivors fleeing the Nova Music Festival. During the battle near Alumim, Gvili encountered a heavy ambush that included RPG fire and was seriously wounded in his arm and leg. Despite his injuries, he reportedly applied a tourniquet to himself, took cover, and eliminated 14 terrorists before his ammunition ran out. Gvili was eventually killed while defending against the infiltrating militants. He was among approximately 251 hostages taken to Gaza by militants on October 7, and his body was abducted to the Strip to be used as a bargaining chip.

== Efforts to recover his body ==
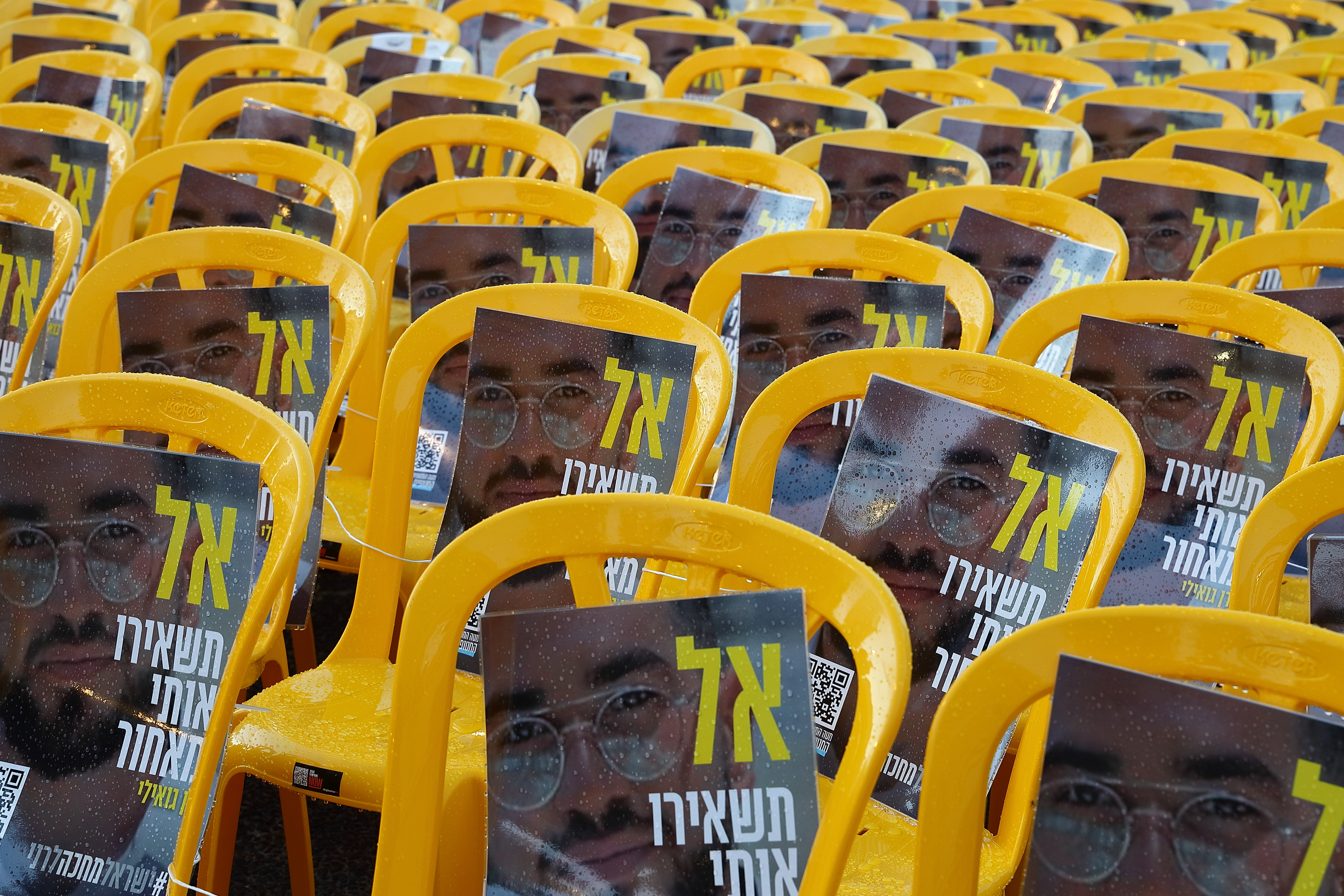
kidnapped square, TLV, waiting for the return of Gvili, the last hostage to be held in Gaza by Hamas

On 30 January 2024, after 117 days of uncertainty, an expert committee of security and health officials determined that Gvili was no longer alive. His parents initially refused to accept the finding, citing contradictions in the intelligence and holding hope that his physical strength had allowed him to survive with medical care in Gaza.

As members of the Tikva Forum, his parents advocated for continued military pressure rather than partial deals, fearing that declaring him a fallen soldier would place him at the "bottom of the priority list" and turn him into a long-term missing person similar to Hadar Goldin or Ron Arad.His mother, Talik, closed her law practice to dedicate herself fully to his return

Following the return of other remains, Gvili became the last of the 251 hostages, taken on October 7 still held in Gaza. The Israeli government set his return as a firm precondition for advancing to "Phase 2" of the regional peace plan.

== Operation Brave Heart ==
In late January 2026, the IDF launched Operation "Brave Heart" (also referred to as Courageous Heart) to locate his remains. Led by the Alexandroni Brigade and the Military Rabbinate, the search was focused on a cemetery in northern Gaza's Shuja'iyya/Tuffah area, where Israeli forces had intelligence indicating the approximate location of his grave. The mission involved combing through hundreds of graves with military personnel, forensic experts, rabbinate representatives, and dentists scanning bodies to match dental records. After exhuming and examining over 250 bodies, the IDF reported on 26 January 2026 that Gvili’s remains had been located and identified, using forensic dental mapping.

== Funeral ==
Gvili was buried on 28 January 2026 at the Meitar Cemetery, in a funeral attended by senior Israeli leaders, including Prime Minister Benjamin Netanyahu and President Isaac Herzog.

== Commemoration ==
Following his abduction, and as a tribute to his courage, the residents of Kibbutz Alumim gave him the honorary title "Rani, Shield of Alumim". A sign bearing this title was erected in the kibbutz, stating that Guaily waged a battle of supreme heroism, thereby saving the lives of the community members. This title reflects his choice to fight alone against superior enemy forces, continuing to return fire even after being wounded, until his ammunition was exhausted.

The phrase "First to leave, last to return" (Hebrew: ראשון לצאת, אחרון לחזור; Rishon la'tzet, acharon lachzor) became synonymous with Gvili, referring to his immediate deployment to the front lines as soon as the battles broke out on October 7, and the way his journey came full circle with his return as the final hostage to be brought back to Israel.

== See also ==
- List of Gaza war hostages
