= Eliezer Shostak =

Israeli politician (1911–2001)

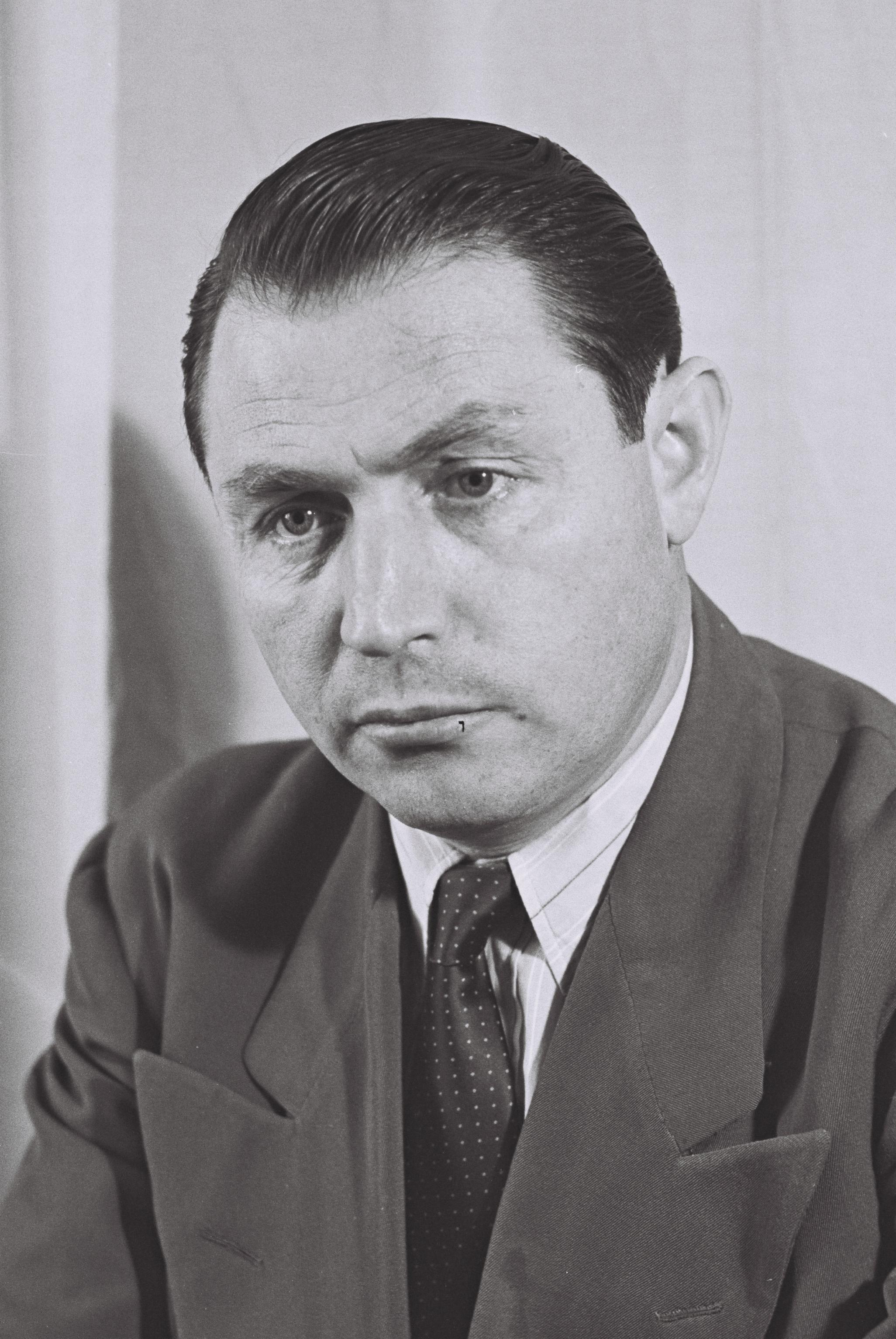
- Shostak in 1951

Ministerial roles
- 1977–1984: Minister of Health

Faction represented in the Knesset
- 1951–1965: Herut
- 1965–1967: Gahal
- 1967–1974: Free Centre
- 1974–1988: Likud

Personal details
- Born: 16 December 1911 Volodymyrets, Russian Empire
- Died: 20 August 2001 (aged 89)

Eliezer Shostak (Hebrew: אליעזר שוסטק; 16 December 1911 – 20 August 2001) was an Israeli politician who served as Minister of Health from 1977 until 1984 and as a member of the Knesset from 1951 until 1988.

== Biography ==
Shostak as born in Volodymyrets in the Russian Empire (today in Ukraine). He joined the Betar movement in 1930 and emigrated to Mandatory Palestine in 1935, joining the Betar work battalion in Herzliya.

In 1936 he was elected secretary of the National Workers Labour Federation. He became a member of the central committee of Hatzohar and sat on the movement's national executive. He was placed third on the Hatzohar list for the 1949 elections, but the party failed to win a seat.

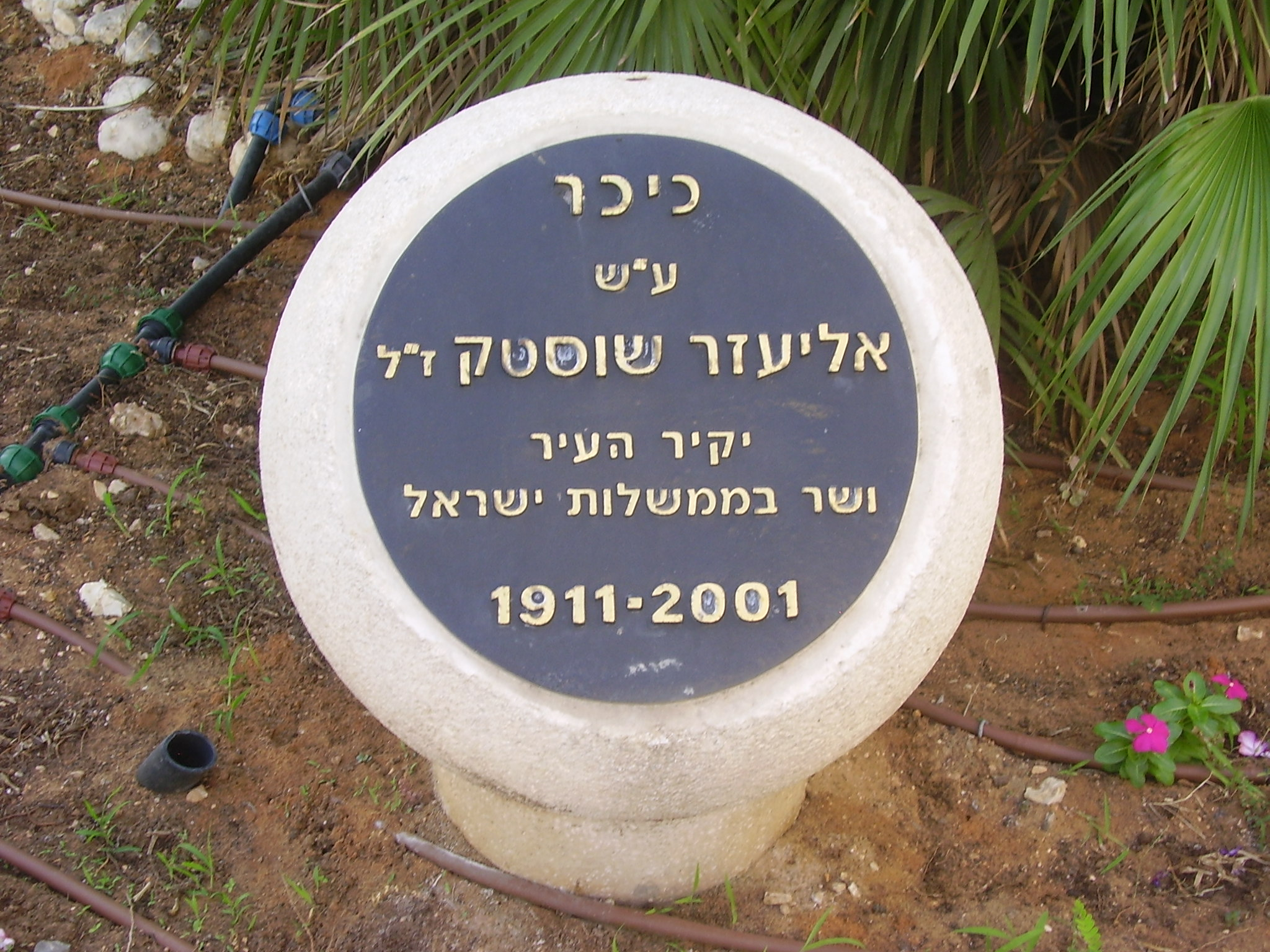
Shostak Square, Ramat Gan

Shostak later joined Menachem Begin's Herut movement, and was placed ninth on the Herut list for the 1951 elections, but missed out on a seat when the party won only eight seats. However, he entered the Knesset as a replacement for Ya'akov Meridor in November 1951. He was re-elected in 1955, 1959, 1961 and 1965. During the Herut convention in 1966 he and Shmuel Tamir constituted the major opposition to Begin's leadership of the party, and the following year he and three other Herut MKs left the party to form the Free Centre. He was re-elected again in 1969, and in 1973 the Free Centre allied with Herut and the Liberal Party to form Likud, for whom he was elected to the Knesset in the elections that year. In 1975, the Free Centre split and Shostak became chairman of the Independent Centre faction.

He was re-elected again in 1977 and was appointed Minister of Health in Begin's government. He retained the role following the 1981 elections, but was left out of the cabinet after the 1984 elections, instead becoming Deputy Speaker of the Knesset. He lost his seat in 1988, having served in the Knesset for just over 37 years.
