= Palestinian casualties of war =

This is a list of casualties suffered by Palestinians in war.

Note: Article is not comprehensive. Some records of Palestinian casualties are under dispute. The criteria used for this article: Casualties inflicted by war or combat. Casualties considered to be "unnecessary deaths" not included. Graph only includes casualties of Palestinian Arabs and not other actors. Bold indicates major actors.

== 1920–1948 ==
Conflicts prior to Israel's independence	Actors involved	Combatant deaths	Civilian deaths	Total deaths	Combatant and/or Civilian wounded	Total casualties
1920 Palestine riots	**British Empire**, Arab rioters.	Not applicable	4	**4**	23	31
Jaffa riots	Jewish civilians Arab civilians	unknown	unknown	**48**	73	121
1929 Palestine riots	(British Empire) , **British Army** **Palestine Police Force**, Betar. Arab rioters.	116 rioters	unknown	**116** Arabs; 133 Jews	232 Arabs; 198 Jews	679
1936–1939 Arab revolt in Palestine	United Kingdom: British Army; Palestine Police Force; Jewish Settlement Police; Jewish Supernumerary Police; Special Night Squads; NDF (from 1937): Arab "peace bands"; Jewish National Council: Haganah; Fosh; Peulot Meyuhadot; Irgun; Arab Higher Committee (1936–October 1937): Local rebel factions (fasa'il); Volunteers from Arab world; Central Committee of National Jihad in Palestine (October 1937 – 1939): Bureau of the Arab Revolt in Palestine (late 1938 – 1939); Society for the Defense of Palestine	British and Jewish forces 562; Palestinian Arabs ca.5,000		**5,000**	15,550 of which,15,000 Arab Palestinians.	18,000–24,000+
1947–1948 civil war in Mandatory Palestine	(Israel) **Jewish National Council**; Haganah; Palmach; Irgun; Lehi; Foreign volunteers; Allied Bedouin tribes; **Arab Higher Committee**; (All-Palestine Protectorate) Army of the Holy War; Arab Liberation Army; Jordan; Arab Legion; **United Kingdom**; Mandatory Palestine	400–600	200–300	At least **720**	1,171	1,800

Total casualties for this period 20,631, including 6,092 fatalities.

== 1948–present ==
Conflicts	Actors involved	Combatant deaths	Civilian deaths	Total deaths	Combatant and/or Civilian wounded	Total casualties
1948 Palestine war, also known as the Nakba	**Yishuv** (before 14 May 1948); **Israel** (after 14 May 1948) Before 26 May 1948: Haganah; Palmach; Hish Corps; HIM Corps; Irgun; Lehi; Druze militants; Allied Bedouin tribes; After 26 May 1948: Israel Defense Forces; Sword Battalion; Foreign volunteers: Mahal; **Arab Higher Committee** (before 15 May 1948); **Arab League** (after 15 May 1948): Arab Liberation Army; Holy War Army; Al-Najjada; Egypt; All-Palestine Protectorate (after 22 Sep 1948); Transjordan; Syria; Iraq; Lebanon; Saudi Arabia; Yemen; **United Kingdom**; Mandatory Palestine (before 15 May 1948)	3,700 foreign Arab troops; 1,953 Palestinians died during battles.	11,047 Palestinians missing presumed dead though not known to have died in combat situations	3,000-13 000 (The higher figure indicate missing and presumed death, though not known to have died in combat situation)		c. 3,000?
Palestinian Fedayeen insurgency	Israel Palestinian Fedayeen Supported by: All-Palestine Protectorate; Kingdom of Egypt (until 1953); Republic of Egypt (from 1953); Syria; Jordan	2,700–5,000	unknown	**2,800–5,000**+	500 (at least)	3,200–5,000
Qibya massacre	Israel Defense Forces: Unit 101; Ariel Sharon	unknown	42	**42**	unknown	42
Battle of Karameh	Israel: Jordan; Palestine Liberation Organization; Fatah; PLA	156	0	**156**	100	256
War of Attrition	Israel: Egypt; Soviet Union; Kuwait; PLO; Jordan; Syria; Cuba	100 (at least)	unknown	**100**	unknown	100+
Black September	PLO: Fatah; Popular Front for the Liberation of Palestine (PFLP); Democratic Front for the Liberation of Palestine (DFLP); Syria (until November 1970): Syrian Armed Forces; Palestine Liberation Army (PLA); Supported by: Organization of Iranian People's Fedai Guerrillas (OIPFG); People's Mojahedin Organization of Iran (MEK); Jordan: Jordanian Armed Forces	3,400	unknown	**3,400**	unknown	3,400
1973 Israeli raid in Lebanon	Israel PLO: PFLP	100+	0	**100+**	unknown	100+
Lebanese Civil War	Lebanese Front: Kataeb Party; Lebanese Forces; Marada Brigades (until 1978) Guardians of the Cedars Al-Tanzim Lebanese Youth Movement (MKG) Tyous Team of Commandos Zahliote Group Shuraya Party Vanguard of the Maani Army (MDJ) (Other minor organizations); Army of Free Lebanon (until 1977); SLA (from 1976); Israel (from 1978) Tigers Militia (until 1980) Lebanese National Movement (1975–1982) Jammoul (1982–1990): Al-Mourabitoun; Progressive Socialist Party (PSP); Lebanese Communist Party (LCP); Syrian Social Nationalist Party in Lebanon (SSNP); Communist Action Organization in Lebanon (OCAL); Lebanese Movement in Support of Fatah (LMSF); Arab Socialist Ba'ath Party – Lebanon Region; Revolutionary Communist Group; Sixth of February Movement; Socialist Arab Lebanon Vanguard Party (SALVP) Popular Nasserist Organization (PNO) Lebanese Arab Army (LAA) Other minor organizations; PLO (1975–1983); ASALA Hezbollah (1985–1990); Iran (from 1980, mainly IRGC and Army paramilitary units) Islamic Unification Movement (from 1982) Syria (1976, 1983–1991); Amal Movement; PNSF; Marada Brigades (left LF in 1978; aligned with Syria) Lebanese Armed Forces UNIFIL (from 1978); Multinational Force in Lebanon (1982–1984): United States; UK; France; Italy; Arab Deterrent Force (1976–1982) List: Saudi Arabia (1976–1979); Sudan (1976–1979); UAE (1976–1979); Libya (1976 only); South Yemen (1976–1977)	1,000's. Unknown	5,000+	**5,000** (at least). Unknown	4,000 (at least). Unknown	5,000–10,000+
1978 South Lebanon conflict	Israel; SLA PLO	1,000–2,000	0	**1,000–2,000**	unknown, heavy	2,000+
1982 Lebanon War	**Israel**; Lebanese Forces; South Lebanon Army; **PLO**; Syria; Others: Lebanese National Resistance Front; Al-Mourabitoun; PKK	unknown	unknown	5,000–8,000; 15,000–20,000	30,000	15,000-20,000
War of the Camps	(Palestine Liberation Organization) PLO: Fatah; DFLP; Palestinian Liberation Front; Supported by: Al-Mourabitoun; Hezbollah; CAOL; SSNP-L (Anti-Syrian government faction); PSP (1987); LCP (1987) Amal Movement: Lebanese Resistance Regiments; SSNP-L (Pro-Syrian government faction) (Palestine) PNSF: PFLP-GC; Fatah al-Intifada; As-Sa'iqa; Supported by: Syria: Syrian Army; (Lebanon) Lebanese Army: 6th Infantry Brigade; 8th Infantry Brigade	2,000 killed by Amal, 3,000+ killed by other Palestinians	unknown, heavy	**5,000+**	unknown, heavy	8,000+
First Intifada	Israel: Al-Qiyada al-Muwhhada; Fatah; Popular Front for the Liberation of Palestine; Democratic Front for the Liberation of Palestine; Palestinian Communist Party; Hamas; Palestinian Islamic Jihad	1,000 killed by Israel security forces, 1,000 killed by other Palestinians	unknown	**2,000** (at least)	unknown, heavy	2,000+
Second Intifada	Israel: Palestinian Authority; PLO; Fatah; Popular Front for the Liberation of Palestine; Democratic Front for the Liberation of Palestine; Hamas; Palestinian Islamic Jihad; Popular Resistance Committees	2,000–3,500+, disputed	1,099–2,800	**4,791** killed by Israeli security forces, **714** killed by other Palestinians	8,611 {unverified-Palestinian claims}	13,400+
Fatah–Hamas conflict	Hamas; (Palestine) Gaza Strip (after June 2007); Supported by: Iran; Fatah; (Palestine) Palestinian Authority; Al-Aqsa Martyrs' Brigades (until 2007) (Note: The Al-Aqsa Martyrs' Brigades was Fatah's armed wing, and while still aligned with Fatah in terms of political ideology, is now a member of the Palestinian Joint Operations Room and allied with Hamas. The AAMB separated from Fatah after Mahmoud Abbas' 2007 decree banning all militias following the Battle of Gaza. Nonetheless, it sometimes still presents itself as the party's armed wing, an association rejected by Fatah leadership.); Supported by: United States (alleged); United Kingdom (covert)	248	98 (at least)	**600**	1,000 wounded	1,600
Gaza War (2008–2009)	Israel; Israel Defense Forces; Israel Security Agency; Gaza Strip; Hamas; (Hamas) Ezzedeen al-Qassam Brigades; Popular Front for the Liberation of Palestine; (Popular Front for the Liberation of Palestine) Abu Ali Mustapha Brigades; Islamic Jihad Movement in Palestine; (Palestinian Islamic Jihad) Al-Quds Brigades; Al-Aqsa Martyrs' Brigades; Popular Resistance Committees	491–709, disputed	295–962	**1,166–1,417**	5,303	6,400–6,700
March 2012 Gaza–Israel clashes	Israel Popular Resistance Committees; Palestinian Islamic Jihad	18	3	**21**	24	45
2012 Gaza War	Israel: Gaza Strip; Hamas; Palestinian Islamic Jihad; Popular Front for the Liberation of Palestine–General Command; Popular Front for the Liberation of Palestine; Democratic Front for the Liberation of Palestine; Popular Resistance Committees; Al-Aqsa Martyrs' Brigades; Jaysh al-Ummah	67–120	109	**174–177**	unknown	
2014 Gaza War	Israel: Gaza Strip; Hamas; Palestinian Islamic Jihad; Popular Front for the Liberation of Palestine; Democratic Front for the Liberation of Palestine; Popular Resistance Committees; Abdullah Azzam Brigades; Jaysh al-Ummah; Al-Aqsa Martyrs' Brigades	693	1617	2310	unknown	
2021 Israel–Palestine crisis	Israel; Israel Defense Forces; Israeli Air Force; Israel Police; Israel Border Police; Shin Bet; Jewish Israeli protesters: Gaza Strip; Hamas; Palestinian Islamic Jihad; Popular Front for the Liberation of Palestine; Al-Aqsa Martyrs' Brigades; Smaller militant groups (Note: Besides Hamas and the Palestinian Islamic Jihad, FDD's Long War Journal identified the following militant groups as having fought in the 2021 conflict: Jihad Jibril Brigades, Humat al-Aqsa, Jaysh al-Ummah, Katibat al-Sheikh al-Emireen, Mujahideen Brigades, Abdul al-Qadir al-Husseini Brigades, and two al-Aqsa Martyrs Brigades splinter factions.); Protesters in Israel and Palestine: Arab Israeli protesters; Palestinian protesters in the West Bank and Jerusalem; Jordanian, Lebanese, and Syrian protesters (see international)			275		
Gaza war	Hamas Palestinian allies: Palestinian Islamic Jihad Popular Front for the Liberation of Palestine Democratic Front for the Liberation of Palestine Palestinian Mujahideen Movement; Israel (Note: See List of military aid to Israel during the Gaza war and American involvement) Israeli allies: Popular Forces (from May 2024)			86,082		

Total casualties for this period 144,963, including 66,789 fatalities.

== Timeline chart ==
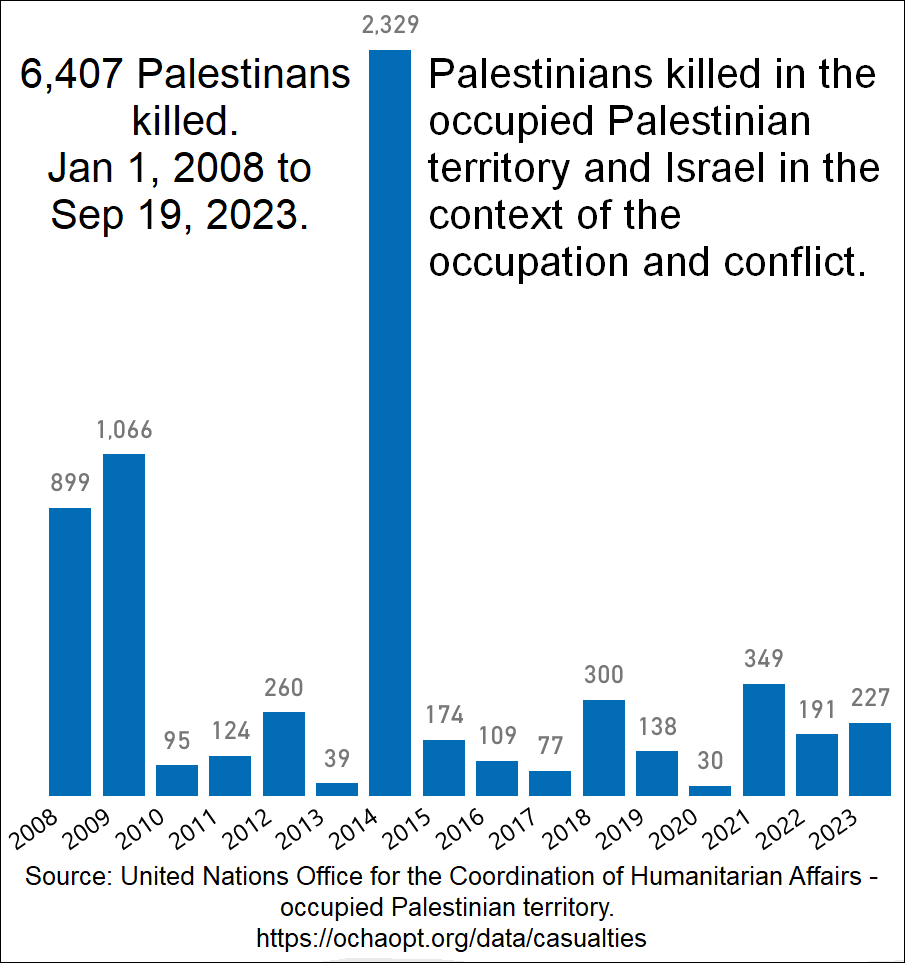
Palestinians killed from 2008 to September 2023.

== Gallery ==
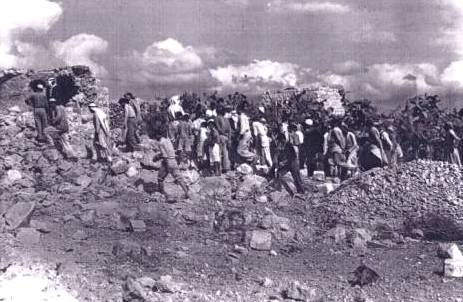
Palestinians returning to Qibya shortly after the Qibya massacre.

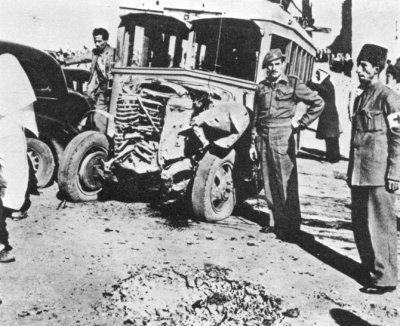
An Arab autobus after being attacked by Irgun during the 1948 Israeli–Arab War.

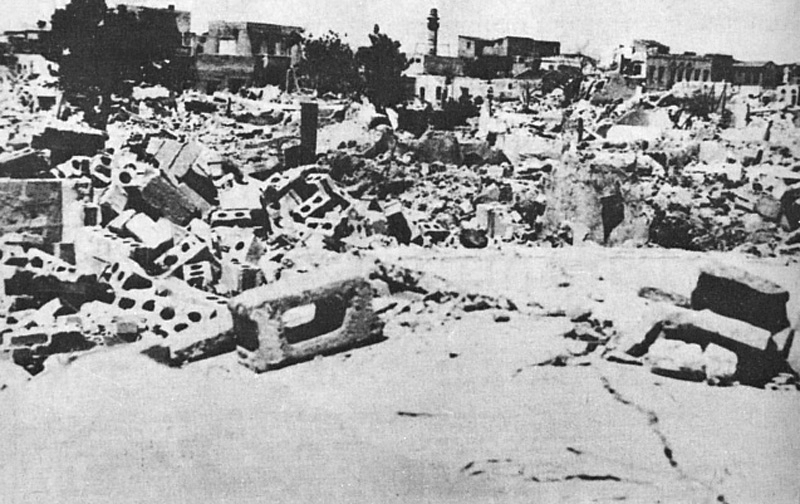
Ruins of Lydda after the Israel Defense Forces conquered it in July 1948.

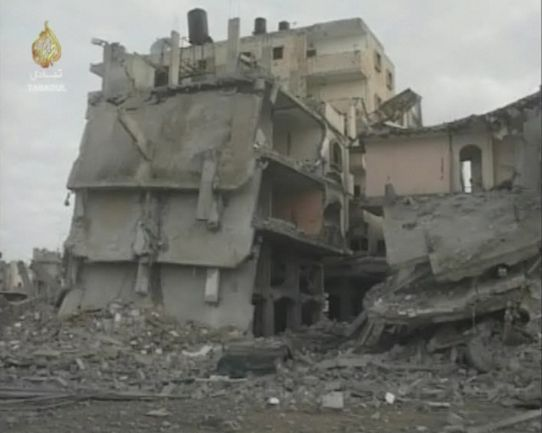
Destroyed buildings during the Gaza War (2008–2009).

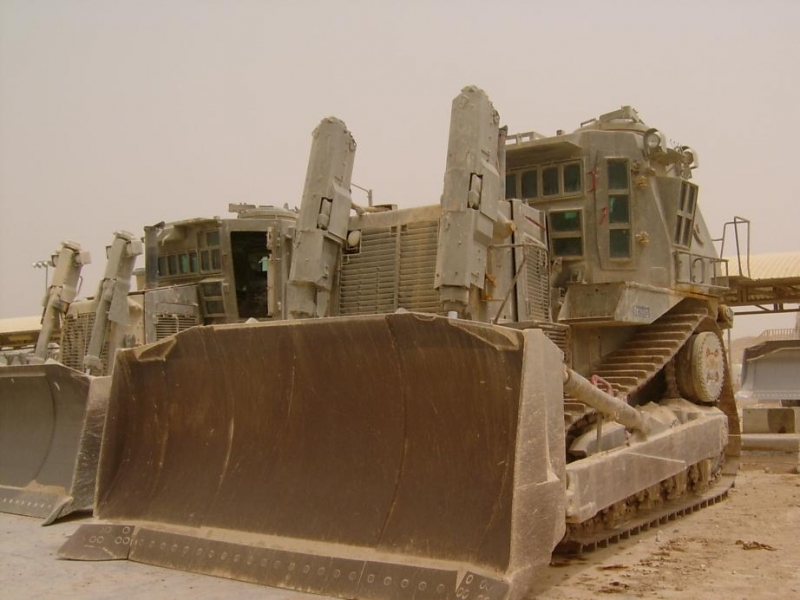
An Israeli armoured bulldozer used in the Battle of Jenin (2002).

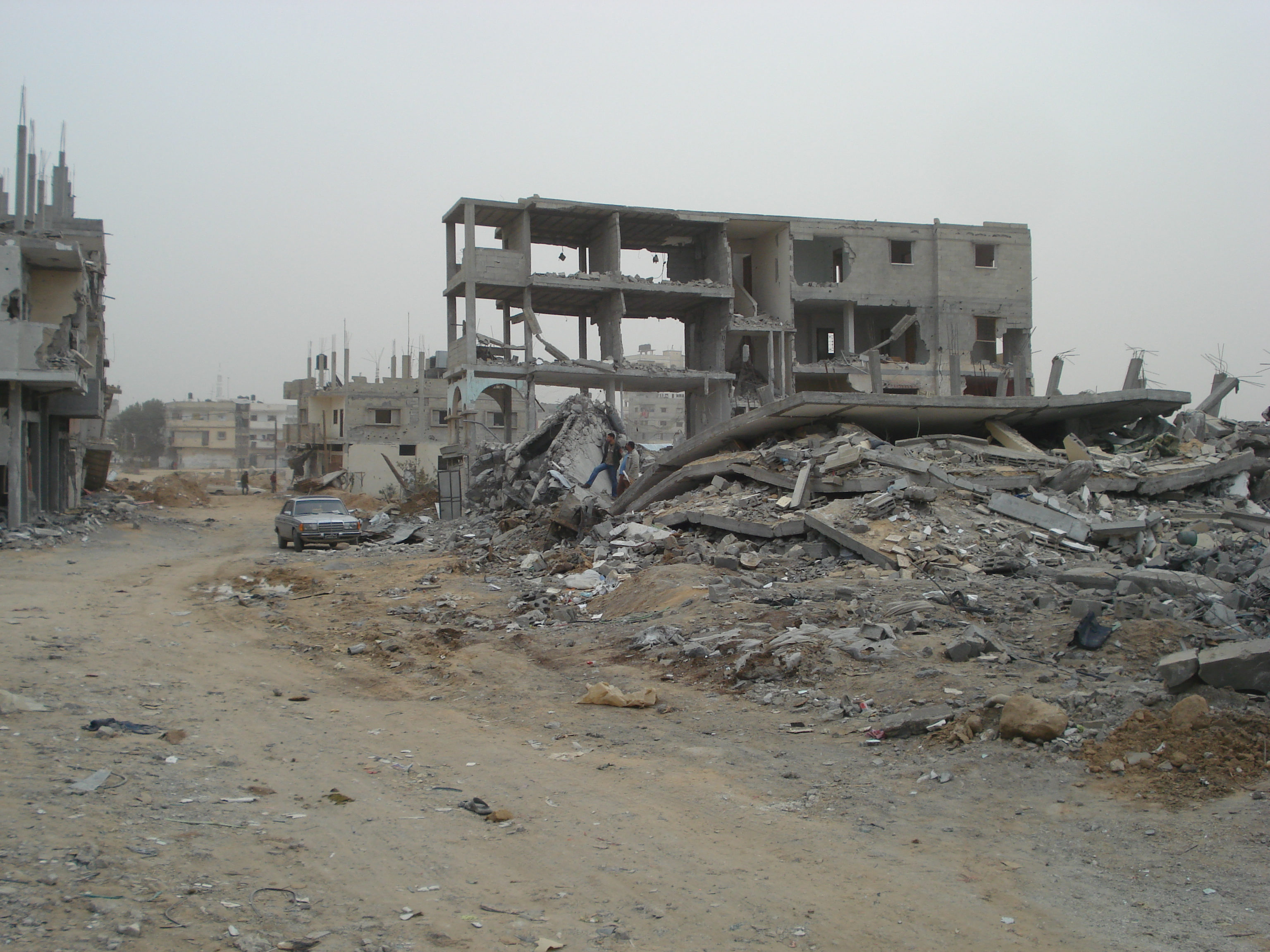
Destroyed and damaged buildings in Gaza City.

== See also ==
- Casualties of Israeli attacks on the Gaza Strip
- Zionist political violence
- Timeline of the Israeli-Palestinian conflict
  - Violence in the Israeli–Palestinian conflict 2002
  - Violence in the Israeli–Palestinian conflict 2003
  - Violence in the Israeli–Palestinian conflict 2004
  - Violence in the Israeli–Palestinian conflict 2005
  - Violence in the Israeli–Palestinian conflict 2006
  - Violence in the Israeli–Palestinian conflict 2007
  - Violence in the Israeli–Palestinian conflict 2008
  - List of violent incidents in the Israeli–Palestinian conflict, 2011
- Israeli casualties of war
- Casualties of the Gaza war
- Media coverage of the Israeli–Palestinian conflict
