= Timeline of the Israeli–Palestinian conflict in 2007 =

List of Israeli–Palestinian events for 2007

- Timeline of the Israeli–Palestinian conflict
- 2006; 2007; 2008

This page is a partial listing of incidents of violence in the Israeli-Palestinian conflict in 2007.

- IDT = Israeli (civilians/soldiers) killed by Palestinians; cumulative
- PDT = Palestinians (civilians/militants) killed by Israelis; cumulative.

The shaky six-month cease-fire between Israel and the Palestinians collapsed when the military wing of Hamas, one of the leading Palestinian factions, resumed rocket attacks against Israel on May 15 in an apparent attempt to draw Israel into the ongoing Palestinian factional violence. Hundreds of rockets were fired since then, many of them landing around Sderot, causing several frightened residents to flee and others are treated for wounds and shock.

In the months since November 2006, smaller Palestinian factions continued to fire rockets at Israel. They included Islamic Jihad, which rejected the cease-fire, and Al-Aksa Martyrs Brigades, which is nominally affiliated with the mainstream Fatah faction headed by the Palestinian president Mahmoud Abbas. Israel said it was ending its policy of restraint against the rocket fire on May 16. Since then, the air force has struck mainly at Hamas structures and cells that the army said were involved in terrorist activity.

Representatives from some Palestinian factions have denounced the rocket attacks. A Popular Front for the Liberation of Palestine official called it "stupid" and Fatah president Mahmoud Abbas called it "pointless and needless" after a meeting with then European Union foreign policy chief Javier Solana. The rival Hamas party rejected the statement, saying "Abbas hates the rockets just like we hate the Jews." Hamas suspects that Israel's attacks are part of an effort to weaken Hamas in favor of Fatah. Then Israeli prime minister Ehud Olmert said that no one involved in terrorist activities is immune. The position of the United States State Department is that the conflict "all started with Hamas not only attacking the legitimate security forces in the Gaza Strip, but also starting a stepped-up campaign of rocket launches against Israel." Israel does not target Fatah's security forces, although it has had clashes with the al Aqsa Martyrs' Brigades, a violent offshoot of the group.

== January ==
- January 4
  - Yusef Muhammad 'Abd al-Qader 'Adur – 24-year-old resident of Bani Na'im. Killed by IDF forces in Ramallah. Not participating in hostilities when he was killed.
  - Khalil Mustafa Darwish al-Bayruti – 36-year-old resident of Ramallah. Killed by IDF forces in Ramallah. Not participating in hostilities when he was killed.
  - 'Alaa Fawaz Muhammad Homran – 16-year-old resident of Arrabah. Killed by IDF forces in Ramallah. Not participating in hostilities when he was killed.
  - Jamal Jamil 'Abd al-Jalil Jweiles – 29-year-old resident of Shuafat. Killed by IDF forces in Ramallah. Not participating in hostilities when he was killed.
- January 15
  - Kamal Mu'in Amin Khader – 18-year-old resident of the Jabalia refugee camp. Killed by IDF forces near Beit Hanoun while participating in hostilities.
  - Mussa Muhammad Mussa Kermutt – 21-year-old resident of Beit Lahiya. Killed by IDF forces near Beit Hanoun while participating in hostilities.
- January 18 – Muhannad Muhammad 'Abd Rabo Gahndur – 32-year-old resident of Nablus. Killed by IDF forces in Nablus while participating in hostilities.
- January 19 – 'Abir Bassam 'Abd Rabo 'Aramin – 10-year-old resident of 'Anata. Shot with rubber coated bullets by IDF forces in 'Anata on January 16 and died of those injuries on January 19. Not participating in hostilities when she was shot.
- January 24 – Mahran Zakaria Salman Abu Nseir – 16-year-old resident of Deir alBalah. Killed by IDF forces in Deir al-Balah. Not participating in hostilities when he was killed.
- January 25 – Fadel Mutlaq Daji Balawaneh – 17-year-old resident of Tulkarm. Killed by IDF forces in Tulkarm. Not participating in hostilities when he was killed.
- January 29 – Eilat bakery bombing – Mohammed Saksak is the first suicide bomber to carry out an attack in Eilat, killing 3 civilians.

== February ==
- February 20 – A would-be bomber and his accomplices are arrested by Israeli security forces in Bat Yam. Explosives are uncovered in a dumpster in Rishon LeZion. It was sponsored by Islamic Jihad.
- February 25 – Two 18-year-old Palestinian men (Mudar Abu Diya and Mussa Ahlil) stab a 42-year-old Israeli father as he prayed in a forest outside of Bat Ayin. Early next day, the youths are arrested by the IDF and Shin Bet and confess to the killing for "nationalist" reasons, and did not proclaim affiliation to any Palestinian group.
- February 24 – "The Israel Defense Forces are continuing in their efforts to foil the militants infrastructure which has benefited from renewed momentum in Nablus. The operation, code named 'Operation Hot Winter,' yielded the discovery of a warehouse used to manufacture explosive devices. IDF soldiers found gas tanks as well as significant quantities of spray chemicals inside the warehouse on Saturday morning." (Brigadier-General Golan).
- February 25 – Israel launches Operation Warm Winter and raids Nablus, where 117 of the 190 would-be bombers of 2006 were produced.
  - Israeli forces uncover three factories containing explosive devices, antitank rockets, materials for preparation of explosive devices and additional weapons, including military equipment and ammunition, a LAW missile, five pipe bombs, a large explosive device and four sacks of fertilizers used for manufacturing bombs. Soldiers also found recording equipment used by suicide bombers to record their final words before they go on their deadly missions. The equipment also included computers and video machines.
  - Palestinian assailants hurl Molotov cocktails at the soldiers near the scene of the two laboratories.
  - During the operation, an explosive device is hurled at the soldiers. Two troops are lightly injured by shrapnel. Seven Palestinians youths were lightly injured after hurling stones at IDF forces.
- February 26 – 1 Palestinian civilian, Anan al-Tibi (41), is killed by shots fired from a passing Israeli army jeep while attempting to escape a surrounded house. Dozens of Palestinians are injured as they clashed with troops.
- IDF bombs two houses, including the home of a senior al-Aqsa commander.
- February 28
  - Residents of Nablus are confined to their homes as Israeli troops move house to house in search of wanted militants.
  - Ten people are wounded as youths throwing stones clash with troops. Fifty people were detained, although most were released, and troops surrounded hospitals to check people going in and out.
  - Israeli army arrests five wanter militants suspects and uncovers three explosives labs.
  - Undercover troops in a black car shoot and kill 3 militants in a Jenin parking lot, including the chief spokesman for the Islamic Jihad.
  - A total of 26 Palestinians are arrested during the operation.

== March ==
- March 16 – Egyptian police arrest Salah Adnan Saleh, a Palestinian student at al-Azhar University, who belonged to Hamas and planned to blow himself up in Israel.
- March 18 – al-Quds Brigades Palestinians fire five Qassam rockets from the Gaza Strip to Israel in three different barrages after a relative period of calm. One of the rockets landed in Ashkelon's southern industrial zone, near a strategic facility. The rest of the rockets landed south of Ashkelon and in open areas in the western Negev. There were no reports of injuries.
- March 19 – A Hamas sniper near the Karni terminal shoots at Israeli utility workers, moderately wounding Koby Ohayon, 42, while he was conducting repair work at a gas terminal near Kibbutz Nahal Oz. Since a ceasefire between Israel and the Palestinians was declared in November, 2006, more than 40 explosive devices have been uncovered near the Gaza fence.
- March 21 – Israeli soldiers patrol the West Bank in search for wanted Palestinian militants.
  - A Palestinian man was killed during a gun battle in Nablus. The clashes in the area had been sparked by a grenade attack on IDF troops. An Israeli military spokeswoman said troops patrolling Nablus came under fire from a gunman and shot him. The man was an al-Aqsa Martyrs Brigades operative that was behind several shooting attacks in Nablus. Palestinian hospital personnel claim he was an unarmed man hit by Israeli fire when troops clashed with Fatah gunmen in the Askar refugee camp near Nablus. Reuters reported the man was Fadi abu Keshek, and confirmed that he was a member of the al-Aqsa Martyrs Brigade.
  - Two Palestinians, one armed with a rifle and the other with grenades, attack Israeli soldiers outside Ramallah. The troops shot the gunman dead.
  - Twenty Palestinian fugitives are arrested.
- March 28
  - Seven Qassam rockets land across the western Negev. The Color Red alert system was activated and no injuries were reported although agricultural products were damaged. Six rockets landed near Ashkelon and one in Sderot. One of the Qassams fell near a strategic facility in the Ashkelon industrial area. The al-Quds Brigades claimed responsibility. A senior official in the organization said that the Qassam fire was in response to the Arab summit in Riyadh; the organization did not accept the initiative.
  - IDF strikes a Qassam launching cell in northern Gaza Strip comprising three militants, who were apparently hit before launching the rockets toward Israel. Palestinians reported four injuries, saying they were civilians. Since the ceasefire came into force, the IDF has refrained from responding to the ongoing rocket fire, even after spotting cells. Some 185 rockets have been fired since then, 152 of them landing on Israeli territory. The strike was Israel's first action since the agreed cease-fire in November 2006.
  - Exchanges of fire in Nablus leave two al-Aqsa Brigades members dead.
- March 29 – Israeli soldiers search for two al Aqsa Martyrs Brigades brothers south of Jenin, arresting one. A group of teenagers confront soldiers and hurl rocks at them; soldiers fire back, killing one.

== April ==
- April 7
  - Israeli helicopter fires two missiles along the border near Jabalya after spotting militants trying to plant a bomb, killing 1 of them (Foad Abu Marof of DFLP) and wounding two other ones. Militants had been spotted planting explosives there two days earlier. Israeli army said militants have planted more than 40 bombs along the border since the cease-fire declaration.
  - Jihad Ziyara, 46, an Arab-Israeli from Jaffa, is kidnapped in Gaza by four men outside his family house.
- April 8
  - Egyptian police uncover a tunnel from Gaza and arrest a Palestinian man who crossed it.
  - A 17-year-old Palestinian stabs two Border Policemen near the Cave of the Patriarchs; another policemen shoots the assailant in the leg. The soldiers and the Palestinian are taken to Hadassah University Hospital in Jerusalem for treatment.
- April 10
  - Recent interrogations of arrested members of Hamas in the West Bank town of Qalqilya produced information that the Islamic organization there was planning imminent militant attacks against Israel, including one using a large truck bomb, said the Shin Bet.
  - A Palestinian in a passing car shoot and moderately wounds an Israeli man standing at a hitchhiking stop near Karnei Shomron.
- April 13
  - Four protesters in an IDF-declared closed military zone are wounded in clashes with border police during demonstrations against the construction of the West Bank security fence in Bil'in. The IDF used rubber bullets and smoke grenades to disperse the rioters from the area.
  - The same incident occurred near Bethlehem, with one protester arrested. The fence was damaged during the protest.
- April 21 – Israeli troops continue a search for wanted militants.
  - 3 militants, including commander of al-Aqsa Martyrs' Brigades Zakaria Zubeidi, are killed as they traveled in Jenin. Palestinian officials said the men were ambushed by undercover troops, while the army said its troops returned fire after the militants shot at them.
  - Later, a fierce firefight takes place between Israeli troops and Palestinian militants in Jenin, as soldiers launched a detention operation. Palestinians hurled explosive devices at troops. IDF troops surround a house and order all inhabitants to leave. The troops claimed it spotted gunshots fired from a house's window, and fired back at a gunman standing at the window. Palestinian officials said the 17-year-old sister of a militant was shot by Israeli gunfire as she peered out the window of her home. It is unclear why she remained. The army is investigating the report.
  - In Kafr Dan, Israeli troops were repeatedly attacked by militants during a raid, and the soldiers fired on a man armed with a rifle standing on a roof. The man was a Palestinian policeman.
- April 22
  - During an operation in Nablus, 2 gunmen are killed. Amin Lubada was involved in carrying out militant attacks in central Israel and in the production of explosive devices and explosive belts. He had been financed by Iranian elements and Hizbullah. Fadel Nir, a senior Islamic Jihad member, was also involved in planning militant attacks, recruiting suicide bombers and producing explosive belts.
  - An Israeli soldier is lightly wounded in the battle.
  - Islamic Jihad in Gaza fire three homemade rockets into southern Israel. One scored a direct hit on a house in Sderot, destroying an external wall, lightly wounding two people and causing four people to suffer from hysteria. Three were evacuated to the Barzilai Medical Center for treatment. The other two rockets hit an open area outside the city. Islamic Jihad, the Popular Resistance Committees and the Al Aqsa Martyrs' Brigades claim responsibility.
  - Minutes later, Israeli aircraft fire a missile at a Palestinian car near the rocket launch site near Jabalya. A man in the car was killed and a second occupant was wounded. Villagers and Islamic Jihad say the man was a civilian who was riding in a car with two IJ militants.
  - Karim Zahran, 17, is shot dead in a crowd as he is about to throw a Molotov cocktail at an army jeep, according to the Israeli army. Palestinian sources said he was throwing rocks.
- April 23 – Hamas declares the Gaza truce over and fires a barrage of 28 rockets and 61 mortar shells at Israel on Independence Day. Hamas reportedly planned to seize another Israeli soldier under the cover of rocket fire, but was thwarted by the army's quick response. Israeli forces fired from the air into open areas from where the rockets had been fired. No injuries.
- April 26 – Izz al-Deen al-Qassam Brigades fire two rockets from Gaza. One lands in the Mediterranean Sea and the other in open area.
- April 28 – Israeli troops shoot at four Hamas fighters trying to plant a bomb near the Israel-Gaza border, killing 3.
- April 29 – Palestinian militants fire rockets from Gaza, narrowly missing an industrial zone in Ashkelon.

== May ==
- May 4 – Undercover Border Police troops follow a vehicle of Islamic Jihad militants in Silat al-Hartiyah. The militants fire on the troops who then fire back killing three gunmen, one of them a wanted member.
- May 5
  - The al-Quds Brigades of Islamic Jihad fire two rockets at Israel.
  - The al-Quds Brigades of Islamic Jihad fire another three rockets at Israel; one severely damages a house in Sderot.
- May 6
  - Islamic Jihad fires seven Qassams into Israel. One explodes near a gas station in Sderot, and the shrapnel moderately to seriously wounds a 24-year-old employee all over his body. Several others were treated for shock. Another rocket attack lightly wounds and slightly impairs the hearing of a man in Sha'ar HaNegev.
  - An Israeli civilian guard accompanying a tank car delivering fuel to a Palestinian gas station near Dir Kadis is fired on by Al-Aqsa Martyrs Brigades (Fatah) gunmen. Suffering severe injuries to his head and leg, he is in serious condition.
  - 3 children are wounded by Israeli fire as they threw rocks at Israeli soldiers carrying out an operation at the home of an Islamic Jihad militant.
  - Five fugitives, including three Tanzim, one Hamas and an Islamic Jihad operative, are caught in Ramallah. Palestinians threw rocks at soldiers operating west of Ramallah, damaging several military vehicles. An Islamic Jihad operative is arrested in Bethlehem.
  - Two rockets are shot into Israel.
- May 7
  - A Quds rocket strikes a house in Sderot and lands near a nursery. 4 people suffer from shock, including a woman who lost consciousness.
  - After fourteen rockets were fired into Israel over the weekend, Israeli aircraft fires at an explosives-laden vehicle near Beit Hanoun carrying Islamic Jihad militants preparing an attack. The strike moderately wounds one militant. (IDF says one militant wounded. Some sources say Islamic Jihad says the wounded was a passer-by, other sources say Islamic Jihad says he was a militant.)
- May 8
  - Israeli forces launch a crackdown on militants in the West Bank, arresting 28 of them (Hamas and Islamic Jihad).
  - Islamic Jihad fires a rocket into Israel.
- May 10
  - Palestinian militants hurl several makeshift grenades at Israeli soldiers operating in the Nablus area. Soldiers identify several militants, injuring 2. A Palestinian woman in the cross-fire is shot and loses her unborn baby; it is unverified which direction it came from, although residents say it was Israeli. An Israeli soldier is lightly wounded.
  - Palestinians open fire on IDF troops in Askar, no injuries.
  - Three rockets from the Gaza Strip land in Sderot. A 6-year-old boy broke his hand when he jumped from his window after going into shock.
  - Fifteen wanted militants suspects are seized in the West Bank and the Jordan Valley.
- May 11
  - A Qassam rocket fired by Palestinians from north Gaza explodes near a strategic facility in Ashkelon's industrial zone. Security personnel activated a siren ahead of time.
  - Two more Qassams fired early morning land near two kibbutzim. The rockets have become more accurate and powerful and carry higher-quality explosives.
- May 13
  - Residents of Sderot and neighboring communities announce a lawsuit against the Palestinian Authority for damages.
  - During the meeting with lawyers, Islamic Jihad launches three Qassam rockets from Gaza towards Israel landing in an open area in the western Negev.
- May 15 – Julien Soufir, a French Jewish immigrant, confesses to police to murder of an Arab taxi driver, Taysir Karaki, in Tel Aviv, for racist reasons. Soufir was also arrested a couple of months ago for domestic violence and was sent to have a psychiatric evaluation. According to BBC News, Jerusalem Mayor Uri Lupolianski's office said the Karaki family should be considered "victims of terrorism" and would receive financial assistance from the state. He was indicted on May 28, and the murder was defined as a hate crime.
- May 15
  - Izz el-Deen al-Qassam Brigades (Hamas) launches twenty rockets at Israel, injuring 17 Israelis and scoring a direct hit into a house with a mother and her 4-year-old son, wounding both, the mother seriously. 5 Israelis were treated for shock.
  - Palestinians open fire at IDF troops operating in Jenin. The soldiers return fire, hitting 1 Palestinian. The man was treated at the scene by IDF medics and evacuated to a hospital. Shots were also fired at IDF patrols in Nablus and Ramallah. Soldiers were not wounded.
- May 16
  - Hamas fires eight rockets at Israel and threatens to draw Israel into Palestinian factional violence in the Gaza Strip.
  - An unidentified assailant hurls a grenade at a residential building on Moshe Sharet Street in Azor. No injuries but a motorbike was damaged.
  - Israel targets a Rafah command centre used by Hamas to plan attacks, killing 4 Hamas militants.
  - Israel targets a car of a rocket crew in a northern Gaza that had just fired into Israel, killing 1 Hamas militant and wounding 2 other Palestinians.
  - About fifty rockets are launched at Israel over the past 24 hours. Sderot residents flee the town, others rush to bomb shelters. Schools temporarily close down.
  - A Kassam hits an apartment building, the shrapnel seriously wounding a woman. A man was lightly wounded in the attack, and four others were treated for shock, bringing the total number of shock victims for the day to 18.
- May 17
  - Three Qassam rockets land in Sderot; one explodes near a building in town, slightly damaging the structure. A mother and her nine-year-old daughter suffer from shock. A car was also damaged.
  - Another two rockets land in open fields in the western Negev.
  - Another Qassam directly hits an unfortified empty high school classroom, severely damaging the structure. 2 people are lightly wounded, and several others suffer from shock.
  - Israel bombs an administration building of Hamas Executive Unit in Gaza City. The two-story structure, normally filled with Hamas personnel, was destroyed, as were some nearby buildings. 1 member is killed, 45 Palestinians are injured.
  - Israel strikes a car carrying a large amount of weapons in central Gaza, critically wounding a commander of a Qassam rocket manufacturing team. At least 5 more Palestinians were wounded.
  - Israel strikes a car on the same street carrying two senior Hamas commanders (a rocket squad) in Gaza City. According to some sources, 1 was killed the other wounded, Hamas said. According to some wire agencies, both were killed. According to the hospital, both were critically wounded. (Confusion may have occurred, as both strikes hit vehicles on Al Gala Street. Please see clarification note below.)
  - IAF strikes a post of the Salah al-Din Brigades (PRC) in Beit Hanoun, no injuries.
  - Israel targets a trailer housing security guards for the Interior Ministry spokesman, killing 1 Hamas militant and injuring 8 people in the Sheikh Radwan neighborhood of Gaza City, considered a Hamas stronghold.
  - A Kassam rocket fired from the Gaza Strip strikes a factory in Sderot and bursts it into flames.
  - A Kassam damages a greenhouse in a moshav in the Eshkol Regional Council. By 7 p.m., 16 rocket attacks were reported in Sderot and the western Negev. Thirty total by the end of the day.
  - Israel strikes a pickup truck near Rafah, killing one teenaged Palestinian and injuring 4 others, according to the hospital. (Again, some agencies reported that the father and another son were also killed. The father is reported to have actually gone into a shop before his truck was hit.) Israeli military said it targeted a rocket squad, Palestinians said it was apparently a case of mistaken identity after Hamas fired rockets from the area.
  - Three rockets land in Sderot, one hits a synagogue. Color Red system was activated, but several people suffer from shock.

(Clarification note: A May 18 article reads: "On Thursday, Israel had hit Hamas targets with three air strikes, killing at least three Palestinians, while five more Palestinians died in factional fighting." [emphasis added] A May 19 article reads: "Saturday's attacks were part of Israel's bombing campaign against Hamas that has killed at least 14 Palestinians since Wednesday." [emphasis added] A May 20 article reads: "Sunday's [May 20] air strike raised to 27 the number of Palestinians Israel has killed in Gaza since it stepped up air raids in response to heightened rocket attacks that have wounded a dozen Israelis in the past week."

- May 18
  - Thirteen rockets are fired into Israel from the Gaza Strip, one explodes in a Sderot gas station in town, lightly wounding 1 man, 2 more were treated for shock. Another damages a house: 3 Israelis are hit by the spray of shrapnel and lightly wounded, 4 are treated for shock. Another rocket caused a fire in a field in Sha'ar Hanegev. Two landed in open areas on the Sapir College campus, and the third hit near Sderot's cemetery. Between 2500 and 3000 residents of Sderot have fled.
  - Israel launches an airstrike on a Hamas headquarters building east of Gaza City, killing 5 Hamas militants, and wounding 6.
  - Israeli helicopter gunships fire on a unit that launched a rocket into Israel, killing 1 and wounding others.
  - Israeli aircraft bombs a Hamas-owned minivan in Gaza City, killing 3 Hamas militants, and wounding 12.
  - Israel Air Force attacked an empty Hamas school in northeast Gaza City at night, injuring 1.
  - A Palestinian from Gaza (who has a valid entry permit into Israel for work) is charged in Jerusalem District Court with gathering intelligence for the Popular Front for the Liberation of Palestine as part of a plan to assassinate Prime Minister Ehud Olmert.
  - IDF unit operating in a village north east of Jenin shot and killed an armed Palestinian during clashes.
- May 19
  - A Palestinian militant cell fires rockets landing in and around the Israeli border town of Sderot, causing damage and a fire in a field.
  - Several minutes after Kassams landed in Sderot, IAF shoot at three-member unit that launched the rockets, killing 3 Palestinians. Palestinian sources claimed the unit members were unharmed and that the IAF strike hit shepherds. The IDF said the launching unit was clearly identified and furthermore, that the air force was operating in an area where Palestinian civilians were clearly warned beforehand not to enter.
- Hamas fires an antitank missile at an Israeli Army bulldozer that was accompanying tanks stationed in Gaza, close to the border with Israel, slightly injuring two soldiers.
- May 20
  - Five Kassam rockets strike Sderot and the surrounding areas in the course of two minutes. One lands in the yard of an empty Sderot house. A second lands in a busy intersection, knocking down traffic lights. 6,000 to 8,000 (of 23,000) Sderot residents have evacuated to temporary "relief" programs.
  - IAF strikes a three-person squad in Jabalya that had just fired a rocket at a community in southern Israel, killing 1. IDF says it hit its target, while Palestinians say the youth was uninvolved but close to a rocket launcher.
  - IAF strikes a car traveling in Gaza City carrying 3 Hamas operatives and a stack of weapons, killing all three.
  - IAF strikes a Hamas weapons workshops in Gaza City and Beit Lahiya, and a third workshop belonging to Islamic Jihad operatives in Nusseirat. No casualties.
  - IAF aircraft fires missiles at a Hamas vehicle in Gaza City, but missed. A bystander was injured.
  - Four more Kassam rockets strike Sderot, with one landing in the city center without exploding. Sappers were called in to defuse the dud rocket. Following morning attacks, 4 people are evacuated to receive treatment for shock. An hour later, an additional four are also taken to treated for shock due to the barrage.
  - Rocket attacks on Israel continue. Israel strikes at Hamas militants in Gaza. Israeli military confirmed a strike against armed Hamas men in the streets, while Palestinians say the strike was against the home of a senior Hamas lawmaker, Khalil al-Hayya. Hayya was away at the time, and the attack killed 8 relatives, two of which Hamas says were militants. 13 injured. The IDF said that the strike targeted 5 Hamas gunmen who were moving through the Sajaiya neighborhood, and identified killing all five gunmen, adding that three bystanders were also apparently killed. IDF denied Hamas reports and claimed Hamas has been attempting to downplay casualties.
  - Israeli tank gunners strike the home of a Hamas militant in Beit Lahiya, wounding him and 4 of his children, one critically.
  - Israel says it targeted an Islamic Jihad weapons workshop in northern Gaza, but the shop owner said his stereo and video store was apparently hit by mistake.
  - Gaza militants fire more than 15 rockets at southern Israel. Several exploded in the battered town of Sderot, causing damage but no serious injuries. One destroyed a popular restaurant in a kibbutz that had been closed due to the Qassams.
- May 21 .
  - Israel strikes a metal workshop in Gaza City where IDF sources say Hamas loads trucks with rockets, killing 1 Hamas militant and wounding 3. The IDF also hit other suspected weapons-storage facilities, causing damage but no casualties.
  - A Hamas member riding on a bicycle (after a Hamas leader warned members of using cellphones or traveling in packs) is wounded by shots from an Israeli aircraft
  - IDF soldiers raided one TV channel and two radio stations connected with Hamas, along with two other TV stations, taking them all off the air Monday. Also the IDF knocked out electricity for approximately 50,000 around Nozeirat when it shelled northern Gaza, no casualties.
  - Israeli tanks fire two shells in the direction of Beit Lahiya, targeting militants who had just launched two Qassam rockets from the area. Three children are wounded.
  - Israeli aircraft fires a missile at a car carrying 4 Islamic Jihad men just after firing rockets into Israel, killing all four.
  - Hamas and Islamic Jihad launch at least 18 rockets into Israel (total over past week is over 150), damaging a road, hitting a car in a commercial center of Sderot, killing a woman and lightly wounding 2 others. 12 were treated for shock.
- May 22
  - Israeli airstrikes target a Hamas weapons cache and an operations room of the Palestinian Resistance Committees.
  - Nine Qassam rockets are fired at Sderot and neighboring towns by the military wings of Hamas and Fatah—the Izz al-Din al-Qassam Brigades and the al-Aqsa Martyrs Brigades. 1 woman is hospitalized for shock.
  - IDF helicopter fires on Palestinians next to the Jabalia, in response to the Qassam attacks that had been launched from that area a few minutes prior. 3 Palestinian farmers were lightly to moderately wounded as a result.
- May 23
  - A Qassam lands near Sderot. The Color Red alarm was activated in advance.
  - Israel targets suspected arms caches and other Hamas sites across Gaza. Israel launches one airstrike in Gaza City and another one on an unoccupied building in Jabaliya used to store munitions, which caused secondary explosions. 7 are injured.
  - Israeli aircraft targets a vehicle carrying several Hamas members in Gaza City, the car managed to evade the attack and none were wounded.
  - Two Israeli soldiers are wounded in a gun battle with Palestinian gunmen in Gaza, the first ground intrusion since November.
  - IDF targets a Gaza shop of a money changer the army accused of transferring millions of dollars to Hamas and other militants groups. Military sources said the money, which was transferred via Syria, Iran and Lebanon, was intended to fund the manufacturing of Qassam rockets and other attacks against Israel.
  - Four rockets were fired at Israel in the evening, 2 land in Sderot and a woman suffered from shock. Other 2 landed south of Ashkelon, killing a mare.
- May 24
  - Palestinians report a civilian man was shot and killed by IDF fire during control of an area in the northern Gaza Strip. IDF has not yet commented on the incident.
  - IDF troops conduct a large-scale arrest operation against Hamas leaders in the West Bank early Thursday morning, arresting 33 Hamas members including the minister of education for Palestinian Authority, four mayors and municipality chairmen and three members of the Palestinian Legislative Council. The raids were aimed at pressuring Hamas to halt rocket attacks from Gaza.
  - Three rockets were fired at Sderot from the northern Gaza Strip. Two of the rockets landed in open fields near Sderot, and one fell near kibbutz Nir Am.
  - Palestinian gunmen fire a Qassam rocket landing in an open field
- May 25
  - At least five Qassam rockets were fired at the western Negev, one starts a fire in a wheat field near Sderot.
  - Israeli helicopter gunships destroy an empty caravan used to house bodyguards of Palestinian Prime Minister Ismail Haniyeh when they fired three missiles on targets in the northern Gaza Strip; no injuries.
  - Israel hits a Hamas training center south of Gaza City, destroying the compound and lightly injuring 3.
  - Israeli airstrike hits a car in Shujaiya that belonged to a cell which has been involved in Qassam attacks in the past, and was apparently on its way to launch rockets at Israel, killing 2 Hamas militants, and wounding 5. Another militant showed no brain activity and medical officials said they could not pronounce him dad. Hamas TV announced 3 deaths.
  - Two Qassam rockets are fired at Sderot in the evening, one lands near a house. 4 people are lightly injured by shrapnel, and 10 other residents suffer from shock.
  - Israeli missiles hit a money-changing business in Gaza City that the army said was "involved in transferring funds to militant organizations." No deaths, but at least 21 Palestinians were wounded, said the Palestinian Ministry of Health, adding that 2 of the wounded were members of the Executive Force, while 19 were civilians, including three women and seven children.
- May 26
  - Two Qassam rockets launched in early morning hours land in open areas.
  - Israel pressed ahead with an air offensive on a Hamas compound in the Zeitoun neighborhood of Gaza, killing 5 Hamas militants, injuring 18 others.
  - Five Qassam rockets fired by Palestinians in north Gaza in evening land in the western Negev. One directly hits an apartment building and a resident sustains light injuries from shrapnel. A second lands on the street; one person is treated for shock.
  - Soon after the rocket attack, IAF launches a series of strikes against Hamas' special forces. The first outpost hit was one in the Sheikh Radwan neighborhood in Gaza. Shortly afterwards, the IAF targeted a Hamas compound in the Jabalya refugee camp. At least two Palestinians were injured in the attack.
  - Israeli troops detain a Palestinian cabinet minister in the West Bank.
  - Dozens of Israeli troops raid two West Bank villages south of Jerusalem, near Bethlehem, in search of militants.
  - 2 Palestinian gunmen open fire at forces guarding the construction of the security fence in Jerusalem's Sheikh Said neighborhood, near Armon HaNetziv. A Border Guard officer and a security guard sustained moderate to serious injuries. A police investigation reveals that security personnel then shot back at the gunmen, who later died of their wounds, and that a Palestinian bystander was shot by Palestinian fire and later died of his wounds. al-Aqsa Martyrs' Brigades claimed responsibility.
  - IDF attacks a Hamas outpost in Rafah, no injuries.
- May 27
  - Color Red rocket alert system is activated in Sderot, causing panic among schoolchildren, followed by explosion sounds. A man was killed in Sderot after a rocket landed near the car he was sitting in. Another resident was lightly hurt and several others suffered from shock. An additional Qassam exploded near Sderot. A Qassam damages a new community center.
  - IDF continues airstrikes in Gaza Strip, bombing another two posts belonging to Hamas' special force, on the City neighborhood of Sheikh Radwan (no injuries) and the other in Jabalya (2 injuries).
  - Israeli soldiers aim artillery fire at gunmen who had shot mortars toward Israel, in southern Gaza, critically wounding 2 of them.
  - Five Qassams are fired into the western Negev in the evening, one completely destroys an apartment. 1 person is lightly wounded from shrapnel, and another is treated for shock.
  - Israeli Air Force strikes a Hamas base near Dir al-Balakh.
  - Four more Qassams land in Israel. One hits in the greenhouse of a community in the Eshkol Regional Council. Two more rockets land in Sderot, where 1 person suffered from shock. Another damages an apartment's wall.
  - Ten posts of Hamas' special force are destroyed in one day.
- May 28
  - Two rockets land in a wheat field near a kibbutz, breaking out a fire. No injuries.
  - IDF aircraft strikes a Hamas training facility in Beit Hanoun. No injuries.
  - Nine more Qassams hit Israel, lightly injuring an Israeli when one landed in an open field in the Shaar Hanegev Regional Council, several others suffer from shock.
  - An entire group of female soldiers in Sderot are treated for severe anxiety after one of the rockets landed near them in the town's cemetery.
  - Most Israeli schoolchildren are not in school. The state is sponsoring "vacations" in hotels away from the border and billionaire businessman Arcady Gaydamak has built a tent city for Sderot refugees.
- May 29 – ("Some 60 Palestinians were killed since the army began operating in Gaza, including 46 Hamas members, four Islamic Jihad operatives and about 10 civilians." Ynetnews).
  - A special IDF force enters the Gaza Strip in the morning and kills 2 Hamas members in a gun battle in the Sufa crossing area.
  - A Qassam rocket is fired from Gaza and landed in an open field near Sderot.
  - Israel detains Jamal Tirawi, a Fatah legislator with ties to the al Aqsa Martyrs Brigades who is said to have ordered past suicide-homicide bombings.
  - Three Islamic Jihad militants were killed in an explosion in the central Gaza Strip. It was not the result of an Israeli attack.
- March 30
  - An Israeli airstrike kills 2 members of Hamas' military wing.
  - Salah al-Din Brigades fires five rockets into Israel, one hits a flat, causing 6 people to suffer shock. The apartment hit was empty at the time, but adjoining flats sustained heavy damages.
  - In the evening, a Qassam rocket hits a power-line and an apartment building in the city, causing a brief neighborhood blackout and the resident family to suffer from shock.
- May 31
  - Two Qassam rockets landed Thursday morning in open areas in the Sha'ar Hanegev Regional Council, one of them near a kibbutz, one started a fire.
  - Moments later, Israel Air Force strikes two Qassam launchers in the northern Gaza Strip, one of which was used to fire one of Thursday's rocket. The Izz al-Din al-Qassam Brigades, the Popular Resistance Committees' military wing, claimed responsibility for firing the rockets.
  - A few hours later, the Air Force strikes an area used by Palestinians to launch Qassam rockets near Beit Hanoun.
  - The car of Sufian Kendil, a senior member the al-Aqsa Martyrs' Brigades, explodes, killing 2 bystanders. Israel was not involved, as the explosives were planted by Fatah members planning to detonate the vehicle near an IDF force which will enter the city.
  - Shin Bet exposes a plot by Hamas members in the Hebron area to carry out an attack against IDF forces on the trans-Judea highway between Kiryat Gat and Kiryat Arba. Three Hamas members planted several explosive devices alongside the highway and intended to detonate one of the bombs in order to draw emergency services and security forces to the scene before detonating the additional bombs. They were arrested in April.
  - Several hundred residents of Sderot held a demonstration Thursday at the Olga junction near Hadera in protest of what they said was the government's inaction in the face of incessant Qassam rocket attacks. The government sends 15 mobile fortified stalls to Sderot.

== June ==
- June 1
  - Four Qassam rockets are fired from northern Gaza. Two land near a Negev kibbutz, causing some damage to the community's garage. Another rocket lands in a kibbutz south of Ashkelon, hitting a warehouse and causing considerable damage. The fourth rocket did not reach Israel and landed inside the Gaza Strip. The al-Quds Brigades were responsible for at least one.
  - Israeli soldiers spot five Palestinians moving suspiciously towards the border fence, call on them to halt, and then shoot at them, assuming they were attempting to plant a bomb. Palestinians say no cell was operating there and that the IDF was justifying their shots, and that the youths were looking for aluminum and iron to sell. Palestinians originally reported that two children were killed. A third was injured and taken to an Israeli hospital. A fourth was arrested by the IDF for questioning. It is unknown why they continued toward the border fence, although the IDF suspects they were sent to examine the forces' alertness in exchange for money. Palestinians later withdrew the claim that the boys were killed.
  - IDF strikes a top member of the al-Quds Brigades, the military wing of Islamic Jihad, in Khan Younis from the air. Islamic Jihad says it will prepare to launch more rockets and suicide bombings.
- June 2
  - A Qassam rocket fired from the northern Gaza Strip lands in a residential neighborhood in Sderot. 4 are treated for shock and two buildings are damaged.
  - Soldiers fire at an armed Palestinian spotted in the Ein Beit Ilma refugee camp in Nablus and injured him.
  - An undercover IDF force fires at gunmen, killing 1 Palestinian and wounding another. Palestinians reported that the man was a shopkeeper shot in the midst of soldier's attempt to shoot two militants, and that other people were injured in the incident, but military officials made it clear that the man shot was a gunman.
  - Palestinian gunmen open fire and hurl explosives at Israeli soldiers in Jenin. Soldiers shoot an armed member of the al-Aqsa Martyr's Brigades dead.
- June 3
  - 1 IDF soldier is moderately injured and 3 are lightly hurt after being hit by three mortar shells fired at the Erez crossing in the northern Gaza Strip. Six other troops suffer from shock.
  - Two mortar shells are fired from the northern Gaza Strip toward the Israeli community of Netiv Ha'asara.
- June 4
  - Hamas' armed wing in north Gaza fire seven mortars toward the western Negev Monday afternoon. One shell lands near a moshav while the rest landed by the Erez Crossing.
- June 5
  - The al-Quds Brigades fire two Qassam rockets that land near the border fence.
- June 6
  - Israel Air Force fires at two armed Palestinians who were spotted planting an explosive device near Jabalya, killing 1 and wounding the other. They were affiliated with the Al Qassam Brigade (Hamas).
  - An elderly Palestinian man is killed by an IDF soldier during an arrest operation of wanted men in his home in Hebron. An Israeli officer and 3 Palestinians are wounded. Conflicting stories erupt.
  - Hamas fires eight mortar shells that slam into the Erez Crossing area shortly after a visit from Deputy Defense Minister Ephraim Sneh, causing damage to the site and a fire broke on the Palestinian side of the crossing compound. Two new centers for victims of trauma in Sderot and the Shaar Hanegev Regional council are inaugurated.
  - Four Qassams are shot into Israel.
- June 7
  - An IDF officer is suspended from operational duty after he threw a tear gas grenade into the house of a Palestinian family in Janiyeh. Three members of the family were lightly injured from inhaling the gas and were evacuated by the IDF for treatment in Israel.
  - Islamic Jihad fires two Kassams at Sderot overnight.
- June 8
  - Two Islamic Jihad gunmen open fire on IDF troops in the Gaza Strip. 1 militant escapes, and the other is critically wounded by troops and dies hours later.
  - A small band of Jewish worshippers desecrate a Muslim cemetery near Nablus. Israeli leadership condemns the act and the organizers of the larger group of worshippers agree to pay for damages.
  - IDF paratroopers operating in Taffuh shot two men armed with guns, wounding one and the other died after reaching the hospital. Palestinians say they were hunters.
  - A Palestinian driver runs over and lightly wounds an Israeli soldier at a checkpoint near Al-Fouar.
- June 9
  - After firing rocket-propelled grenades, four to five Islamic Jihad and al-Aqsa Martyrs Brigades gunmen traveling in a jeep marked 'TV' infiltrate Israeli territory from the Kissufim border crossing between Israel and the central Gaza Strip and attack IDF troops stationed in the area in an attempt to kidnap a soldier. IDF kills 1 and the others manage to escape. According to the Israeli army the jeep was marked 'TV', the AAMB says the jeep was marked with a U.N. insignia, while the IJ denies any markings on the jeep. Reuters confirms the Israeli version.
- June 10
  - Hours later, Israel launches retaliatory airstrikes on an Islamic Jihad office in western Gaza City, and twice strikes a metal workshop of the al-Aqsa Martyrs Brigades, used for the production of rockets and mortars.
  - The al-Quds Brigades fire six rockets at Sderot and the western Negev, all landing in open areas.
- June 12
  - Al-Quds Brigades fires a Qassam at a factory located in the Shaar Hanegev industrial zone, slightly damaging it. A worker sustains light injuries from shrapnel.
- June 13
  - A Qassam rocket lands in a western Negev high school Wednesday morning, shattering windows, and another lands in an open field near Kibbutz Nir Am.
  - The Shin Bet reveals that a double suicide bombing in Tel Aviv and Netanya. Two Palestinian women were arrested at the Erez crossing following Shin Bet intelligence reports.
- June 14
  - Palestinian gunmen fire 2 rockets in the morning. A vehicle is damaged and a number of people suffer shock.
- June 18
  - A Qassam considerably damages a factory near Sderot
  - Shin Bet reveals details of apprehending members of the Popular Front for the Liberation of Palestine (PFLP) south of Mt. Hebron. The 12 militants cell members said during their interrogation that they were directed by PFLP members in Gaza and plotted to carry out several attacks in Israel, including an attack on a synagogue in Modi'in. They also plotted to kidnap American citizens in the West Bank in an attempt to later swap them for imprisoned PFLP Secretary-General Ahmed Saadat.
- June 20
  - Islamic Jihad fires two rockets into southern Israel.
  - Israeli aircraft spots the rocket launchers east of Beit Hanoun, fires missiles completely destroying both.
  - Five Palestinian gunmen, all members of the Popular Resistance Committee's military wing, the Salah al-Din Brigades, are killed during a gunfight with IDF soldiers near the border fence in the central part of Gaza. An IDF soldier is moderately injured.
  - Two Palestinian militants open fire on Israeli troops during an arrest raid on a house near Jenin. One is a local commander from the Islamic Jihad militant group and the other a local commander from a violent offshoot of Fatah.
  - Shin Bet reveals details of Ala Hamad, a Jordanian citizen who holds an Israeli ID, recruited by Hamas operatives based in Damascus to kidnap an Israeli citizen in Jerusalem.
  - Five Qassams land in Sderot in the evening. The attacks are first claimed by Hamas, and then by Islamic Jihad. Three Israelis are lightly wounded, seven are treated for shock. Two homes and a synagogue sustain damage. One rocket hit an electric pole cutting power supplies to Kibbutz Nir Am.
- June 22
  - IDF soldiers near Hebron shoot an unarmed Palestinian trying to breach the gate, injuring him. Soldiers yelled for him to halt—which he did not, fired warning shots and then shot the man. He died of his wounds in the hospital.
- June 24
  - Palestinians fire two Qassams that land in Sderot, causing damage to two houses, including one that was already damaged from a Qassam about a month ago. Three Israelis are lightly wounded; several others are treated for shock. A Fatah offshoot and the al-Quds Brigades (Islamic Jihad) both claim responsibility.
  - Palestinians fire 11 mortars towards Israel Sunday afternoon, causing fires.
  - A member of the military wing of the Palestinian Islamic Jihad branch is killed by a missile while driving in his car. The man was involved in Qassam attacks earlier this weekend. The air strike happened in Eastern Gaza. Islamic Jihad spokesmen confirmed one of its fighters, Hussam Harb, was killed in the blast and that he was responsible for the Qassamattacks, which injured 3 Israelis.
- June 27
  - Four Palestinians are killed in a raid in Central Gaza, in a neighborhood in Gaza. The IDF said it targeted a vehicle, killing Fa'ad Ranuna, a senior commander of the Palestinian Islamic Jihad branch and another member of PIJ. The other two were civilians, Eiz al-Deen Jondiah(12) and Hazen Jondiah(30), caught in the crossfire.
  - 3 Palestinians are killed in an incursion in Southern Gaza. IDF commanders said they met stiff resistance, as if the militants were 'waiting' for them. All three militants were members of Hamas. 2 Israeli soldiers were lightly injured as their tank was hit by an anti-tank missile.
  - A militant from the Palestinian Islamic Jihad succumbs to his wounds.
  - A Palestinian Qassam manufacturer is killed by an explosion of one of his Qassams in his workshop.
  - A senior Islamic Jihad member is killed by an explosion, but Israel denied an aerial attack. He was known as Di Abu Daka.
  - 3 Qassams are fired at Israel today, lightly shocking a resident of Sderot. Palestinian Islamic Jihad claimed responsibility.
- June 29
  - 2 mortars and a Qassam are fired into Israeli territory, causing no damage or casualties.
- June 30
  - 3 members of the Al-Aqsa Martyrs Brigades are killed by an IAF missile in Central Gaza. One of the killed was identified as Salah Kopah, a senior member of the group. They were killed in the refugee camp of Jabalya.
  - 4 Palestinian Islamic Jihad militants are killed in a separate air strike in the southern city of Khan Younis. The casualties were identified as Gharam Diab, Raed Ghanaem, Muhammad al-Raei and an unknown member.
  - A Qassam rocket is fired at Sderot, landing in the Negev.

== July ==
- July 1
  - During a raid in Jenin, the IDF kills a top commander of the Al Aqsa Martyrs Brigades, Muhammad el-Haija . He was considered to be second in command in Jenin, after the Brigades commander Zakaria Zubeidia. 6 other militants were detained by the IDF in the West Bank.
- July 5
  - IDF forces raided central Gaza, searching for weapons caches and smuggling tunnels, but met fierce resistance from Palestinian militants, especially Hamas. IDF forces noticed a large amount of Palestinian militants, and shot at them. Palestinians responded with gunfire, anti-tank missiles, explosive devices and mines. IDF now used bulldozers, tanks and choppers to fight the militants. At one point IAF jets joined the fight. In the clash, 11 Palestinian militants were killed, including nine from Hamas and one from Islamic Jihad. More than 20 people were wounded, including a Hamas cameraman and 2 Israeli soldiers. One of the people killed was Mohammed Siam, a local commander.
  - 3 mortars and 2 Qassams were fired into Israel, causing no damage and injures. Hamas and Islamic Jihad both claimed responsibility.
- July 7
  - In an IDF operation in Gaza, 7 Qassam rocket launchers are noticed. All were destroyed by the IDF. Some were detonated with a timer.
- July 8
  - 5 Qassam rockets are fired into Israel. 4 landed in open area's, but one landed near a college in Sderot. Nobody was injured. Islamic Jihad claimed responsibility.
- July 9
  - A Palestinian militant, Mohammed Nazal, 24 is killed by IDF forces in an ambush near Jenin. He was a member of the Islamic Jihad, Palestinian sources confirmed.
  - 3 Qassams are fired into Israel, causing damage but no injuries. Palestinian Islamic Jihad claimed responsibility.
- July 10
  - 11 mortars are fired into Israeli territory in 3 separate barrages. 2 buildings contained damage, but there were no casualties. One mortars landed near the Kerem Shalom Crossing. Palestinian Islamic Jihad claimed responsibility.
- July 12
  - A soldier, Arbel Reich (21) is killed in Central Gaza in an ambush. IDF soldiers, together with tanks and bulldozers entered the area and when they entered the al-Bureij refugee camp, they were ambushed by Hamas militiamen with a burst of machine gun fire and RPG rockets. 2 other IDF soldiers were wounded. 2 Palestinian militants were wounded by an IAF airstrike in the same area.
  - Despite the presence of Israeli forces in the Gaza Strip, Islamic Jihad managed to fire a Qassam rocket to Sderot. Nobody was injured.
  - A Palestinian man armed with an AK-47 and an explosive belt is killed in Tulkarem. The man drove with his car to a checkpoint and began shooting at the checkpoint with his Kalashnikov. The soldiers returned fire, killing the Palestinian. No militant group claimed responsibility.
- July 19
  - A Qassam rocket fired from the northern Gaza Strip on Thursday hit a home in the city of Sderot. Seven people suffering from shock were taken to the Barzilai Medical Center in Ashkelon. A number of buildings were damaged in the strike.
- July 22
  - Israeli aircraft killed 2 members of the Al Quds Brigades, the armed wing of the Palestinian Islamic Jihad. The airstrike was a retaliation for the Qassams fired on Saturday evening, which landed in the Negev, causing some damage. Islamic Jihad confirmed two of its militants were killed in the attack while launching rockets, carried out by a chopper.
  - 2 Hamas militants are killed near the border fence while trying to plant explosive devices. They were spotted and killed by gunfire by Israeli soldiers. Hamas confirmed the dead of the two men. They were known as Mustafa Abbas and Mohammed Marouf.
- July 26
  - During a ground operation in the Gaza Strip, the IAF was called in and spotted Hamas militants near IDF soldiers in Southern Gaza. Tank fire then killed a Hamas militant who was holding a RPG in his hands, Palestinian sources said. The IDF said the missile was fired by a helicopter. The killed was known as Sharif al-Baraeis (35), member of the Iz-ad-Din al Qassam brigades.
  - More than 10 mortars and Qassam rockets are fired at Israel this week, causing some damage and three injured.
  - An Israeli airstrike south of Gaza City killed three Islamic Jihad men traveling in a car. One of the dead was Omar Khatib, who headed the group's military wing in the Gaza Strip. The other two were known as Khalil Daifi and Ahmed Abd Al-el.
- After the fight, Islamic Jihad members tried to retrieve items in the burnt car, but Hamas gunmen refused them to enter the scene. A firefight erupted, wounding four Palestinians.
- Israeli troops struck and killed a Palestinian who tried to stab a soldier. The man's family said he later died of his wounds and that he was mentally ill.
- Six Palestinians are wounded by airstrikes in the Gaza Strip in two separate events.
- July 28
  - Two al-Aqsa Martyrs Brigades militants are killed while planting a bomb near the Gaza-Israel border after ignoring warning fire to leave the area.

== August ==
- August 1
  - A Hamas operative and a Popular Resistance Committees militant are killed in Beit Lahiya. The two were spotted by Israeli soldiers operating in the area in search for Qassam rockets and their launchers. In the firefight an antitank missile was fired at Israeli soldiers, causing no injuries. Hamas and PRC confirmed its men were fighting Israeli soldiers in Beit Lahiya.
  - 4 Qassam rockets are fired into Israel, causing some damage.
- August 4
  - An Islamic Jihad commander, Raad Abu el-Adas is killed by Israeli forces near his home in Nablus. IDF troops were already looking for him and when they encircled his house he decided to flee through a window, while another Islamic Jihad member fired at troops who were storming the house. The other member was wounded in the battle.
  - 3 Qassam rockets are fired at Sderot, causing 3 injured people.
- August 5
  - An IDF officer was lightly injured in an operation in the Nablus area after Palestinian gunmen opened fire at the force. Eight wanted Palestinian militant suspects were arrested across the West Bank on Sunday night. Three were detained in Nablus and the other five were arrested near Ramallah and in Hebron.
- August 6
  - An IDF force operating in the West Bank on Monday morning uncovered an explosive device weighing 40 kilograms (88 pounds), which was hidden inside the corpse of a sheep. The soldiers were led to the device by a Palestinian militants who was arrested and questioned by the defense establishment.
  - A rocket launched from northern Gaza landed in a kindergarten schoolyard in Sderot, moments after the completion of a Monday afternoon meeting between Prime Minister Ehud Olmert and Palestinian President Mahmoud Abbas. The al-Quds Brigades, the military wing of Islamic Jihad, took credit for the attack, which caused damaged to nearby buildings, including two other kindergartens and a public elementary school. The Color Red system was activated.
- August 7
  - 2 Hamas gunman are killed in the Gaza Strip. They were spotted near the Karni Crossing by soldiers outside the strip. The soldiers entered the Strip, exchanged gunfire and killed them.
  - An Israeli soldier is lightly injured by an explosive device thrown at IDF forces by a Palestinian in Nablus.
- August 9
  - IDF soldiers killed a Palestinian near the Suffa crossing in southern Gaza on Thursday afternoon. The army said soldiers had spotted the man crawling near the border fence. Suspecting he was planting a bomb, they called on him to stop and shot in the air. When he continued moving, they fired at him. Palestinian medics brought his body to a hospital in Gaza and said they did not find weapons near his body.
- August 10
  - A security guard at the Ateret Kohanim yeshiva in the Old City of Jerusalem shoots and kills a Palestinian man who snatched the weapon of another guard and used it to wound him. Eleven people were wounded in the shooting, including the guard, who was moderately hurt.
- August 14
  - Palestinians fire a rocket into Israel from the northern Gaza Strip.
  - Israeli forces kill six Palestinians when they clashed with militants during a raid on the Hamas-controlled Gaza Strip. 2 Hamas militants and a 40-year-old bystander were killed during the raid on the southern villages of al-Qarara and Abasan, hospital officials said. Hamas said another of its gunmen and his mother were shot and killed as they emerged from their home in the area. At least 16 Palestinians were wounded in the fighting in which the Israeli troops were backed by military aircraft. Militant group Islamic Jihad said one of its members was killed and at least four were wounded by a missile strike during the raid. Twenty-six others, mostly militants but including at least five civilians, were wounded in the daylong operation.
- August 17
  - Israeli aircraft fired two missiles Friday at Palestinian rocket launchers in the northern Gaza Strip.
  - A clash in the West Bank village of Kafr Dan leaves two Palestinians dead. The clash began when IDF forces entered the village near Jenin where members of the Islamic Jihad and Fatah were hiding. After they were spotted, a firefight followed. Nur Mare'i, 19, an Islamic Jihad activist, and Muhammad Darwish, a leader of the tiny Abu Amar Brigades linked with Fatah, were killed. Clashes in the West Bank also injured 8 Palestinians.
  - An IDF soldier is lightly injured when an explosive device is hurled at his jeep in Nablus. The militant managed to escape.
  - In a rocket barrage, 3 Qassams and 13 mortars are fired into Israel by the Palestinian Islamic Jihad. No casualties or damage was reported.
  - A tunnel in Gaza, recently discovered by the IDF has been blown up. The 700 meter long tunnel was made for militants activities, the IDF said. Palestinians said the tunnel was made to carry tomatoes.
  - Israeli forces had also found and disarmed an explosive charge near the security barrier separating the Gaza Strip and Israel.
- August 18
  - Israeli forces shot three Palestinians near the border fence. The army said they repeatedly ordered them to leave the area. One of them died, the other two were wounded. It is not sure if they were armed or unarmed.
  - 5 Palestinian infiltrators are caught and brought back into Gaza. Apparently they were looking for work, because they were unarmed.
- August 20
  - 6 Palestinians, all members of the armed wing of Hamas are killed when their vehicle was blown up by an Israeli missile. The Palestinians were driving back after they had fired some Qassams and mortars into Israeli territory.
- August 21
  - A Palestinian gunman from the Popular Front for the Liberation of Palestine is killed by Israeli forces in Nablus. The militant opened fire at Israeli forces operating the area, but was killed when IDF soldiers returned fire.
  - 3 Palestinians are killed near the Gaza border fence. The Palestinians were armed with sniper rifles, the IDF added. Palestinian sources haven confirmed the death of the men.
  - 2 Qassams are fired into Israel, one hitting a kindergarten, injuring and shocking some people.
- August 22
  - In an airstrike in Northern Gaza, the IAF kills a top commander of Hamas, Yehia Habib in an airstrike. Two other members were wounded, one seriously.
  - In a fierce clash between the IDF and Islamic Jihad, 3 members of Islamic Jihad are killed by the IDF. 2 children are caught in the crossfire and also killed. The IDF said they traced two men near a rocket launcher in Gaza. It is known that militant groups give children some money to collect the rocket launchers spokesman of Islamic Jihad said the man were on a mission against Israel.
  - A Qassam is fired into Israel.
- August 23
  - Islamic Jihad fires 7 Qassam rockets into Israeli territory, causing some damage. A woman is treated for shock.
  - 3 Israeli soldiers are lightly injured by explosive devices thrown by militant Palestinians in Nablus.
  - 4 Hamas fighters are wounded in an aerial assault by the IAF.
- August 24
  - An 11-year-old boy is killed in the crossfire between Palestinian militants and the IDF. The IDF entered the Kfar Saidi village in the West Bank looking for wanted men, when they were attacked by militants. In the gunfight, the boy and an Islamic Jihad fighter were killed. A second IJ fighter was seriously injured and captured by Israeli forces. On Israeli side there were no casualties.
  - 2 Palestinian militants were using the morning fog to get unnoticed over the border fence but were sensed by IDF soldiers. In the firefight the two, Khadar Oukel (20), from the Salah-ad-Din brigades the armed wing of the Popular Resistance Committees and Muhammad Sakar(22) of the National Resistance committees, the armed wing of the Democratic Front for the Liberation of Palestine were killed while lightly injuring an IDF soldier.
- August 25
  - A senior commander of the Al Quds brigades in Jenin, the armed wing of the Palestinian Islamic Jihad is killed when undercover forces opened fire on his vehicle, loaded with other PIJ militants. Another militant was seriously wounded in the raid.
  - The militant wounded earlier this day, has succumbed to his wounds, Palestinian medical sources said.
- August 27
  - A Palestinian man is killed by IDF fire near the Gaza border fence. He was unarmed. Palestinian sources said he was a farmer. IDF sources said the soldiers suspected the man tried to lay explosive devices near the border.
  - A Qassam rocket is fired into Israeli territory. The launcher was minutes later destroyed by an Israeli missile.
  - An IDF major driving in the West Bank occasionally took the wrong turn, and drove to the Palestinian city of Jenin, instead of a settlement. The uniformed major was sensed by a mob and his car was burnt. Islamic Jihad militants tried to kidnap the officer, but were halted by Preventive Security forces, who protected the major and called in nearby IDF forces for help.
- August 28
  - A Sderot resident is moderately injured by shrapnel from a Qassam rocket which fell on his house in his bedroom. The rest of the family was hiding in the bomb shelter after the Color Red system was activated. the Al Aqsa Martyrs Brigades claimed responsibility for the attack. 7 other Qassams are fired today, causing only some damage and two people shocked.
- August 29
  - 4 Qassam rockets are fired into Israel.
  - 3 Palestinian children are killed in the northern Gaza Strip between Beit Lahiya and Jabalya, when IDF attacked 5 rocket launchers aimed at southern Israel. The Qassam launchers were deployed just outside Beit Hanoun's industrial zone. Palestinians believed Israel wanted to target a militant cell. The two boys died immediately, while their cousin later died from her wounds. The civilian area is frequently used by Palestinian militants to launch rocket attacks against southern Israel. The army said 92 rockets and 118 mortars fell in Israel over the past month. Palestinian sources did not say whether the children were hired by militants to retrieve the launchers, or whether they approached the launchers out of curiosity. The IDF said the children were killed after an army tank fired on a Qassam launcher. According to the IDF, the tank's crew detected "unidentified movement and opened fire." In a statement, the Israeli military said it "wishes to express sorrow" for the "use of teenagers in militant attacks." In the past the military has accused militants of sending children to pick up their rocket launchers, but it did not explicitly say the three dead children in Wednesday's incident were directly involved.
- August 30
  - An elite Israel Defense Forces paratrooper unit shot and seriously wounded a Palestinian militant in Nablus' Old City early Friday. The militant, who belonged to a cell that operated jointly under Fatah's military wing – the Al-Aqsa Martyrs' Brigades – and the Popular Front for the Liberation of Palestine, was taken to a local hospital for treatment.
  - Also Friday, three Qassam rockets fired by Palestinian militants in the Gaza Strip struck open areas in the western Negev. There was no damage or injuries in either of the attacks.

== September ==
- September 6
  - 4 Hamas militants were killed in an army operation in Southern Gaza. the 4 were hit by a tank shell which exploded near to them, Palestinian sources said. the IDF said the militants approached them but soldiers spotted them in time, causing a burst of Israeli gunfire, causing the deaths. 10 more militants were wounded, either by gunfire or tank shells.
  - IDF soldiers foiled a militant attack near the Gazan border. Two cars, filled with 6 heavily armed Palestinian militants were driving to the fence with automatic rifles, grenades, RPGs, suicide belts and TNT. IDF soldiers noticed the cars came with high speed to the fence and fired at them. IAF planes also fired at the vehicle. Palestinian reports say the vehicles made it into Israeli territory, sparking a heavy gun battle in which all 6 militants were killed. Israeli reports said the vehicles did not make it into Israeli territory and that the militants were killed inside Gazan territory. Al Aqsa Martyrs Brigades and Palestinian Islamic Jihad claimed responsibility, claiming they had both 3 members involved.
  - An IDF soldier is lightly injured by mortars near the Gaza fence.
- September 10
  - 2 Qassam rockets are fired at the Zikim Army Base in Israel near the Gazan Border. One of them lands safely in the Negev, but the other lands near unfortified barracks at the base where Israeli recruits were sleeping. 69 soldiers were wounded by the rocket; 60+ of them had only light to moderate shrapnel wounds, but 4 of them were injured seriously. One of the 4 had to have his leg amputated, and another one is still in critical condition. Both Islamic Jihad and PRC claimed responsibility. Although Hamas was not responsible, they called the act a Victory from God.
  - In retaliation, Israeli choppers flew over the Strip, firing missiles at militant bases, wounding 4 Islamic Jihad members.
- September 16
  - During an operation in the Nablus area, Israeli soldiers fired at two armed members of the Al Aqsa Martyrs Brigades, killing of them.
- September 18
  - In Hebron 2 Palestinian families were fighting with each other, using sticks and stones, but also firing bullets near the settlement, causing an IDF patrol. In the patrol, a Palestinian family and the IDF clashed in a gun battle, leaving one Palestinian dead, Baha al-Ajlouni, 27.
  - IDF forces shot and killed Yusuf al-A'achi, a gunman from Hamas in the Nablus area in the refugee camp near Nablus.
  - 4 Qassams rained down on Israeli Gaza border communities today. Nobody claimed responsibility.
  - In another clash in the refugee camp, an IDF soldier Ben-Zion Haim Henman, 21, was killed by gunfire. His comrade was lightly injured by shrapnel. The IDF forces were targeting a PFLP cell. One of the members of the cell, Muhammad Halad, critically injuring him. He succumbed 15 minutes later to his wounds. IDF and Palestinian sources said Muhammad was responsible for the death of Haim Henman.
- September 25
  - IDF forces shot and wounded a member of an Al Aqsa Martyrs Brigades Qassam launching cell. The man, Hussam al-Hawihi (21) survived, but later succumbed to his wounds.
- September 26
  - Hours after militants launched more than 12 rockets and 20 mortar shells at Sderot, at least 3 missiles hit a jeep as it crossed a crowded intersection in the Zeitoun neighborhood of Gaza City, killing 5 members of the Army of Islam. The army said the jeep was carrying rockets ready for firing. The five killed are Fawzi al-Ashram, Hussein Ahl, Ayman Dalul, Osama al-Sifi and Samer al-Zaim
  - Palestinian security officials seized two homemade rockets, a possible sign that the attack techniques of Gaza militants are spreading. The projectiles, not yet fitted with explosives, were discovered in Bethlehem and handed over to the Israeli army.
  - In Beit Hanoun, militants fired at Israeli troops in the area. Troops fired back at his home, killing him and 3 other Palestinians, 2 of them civilians. Two of those were identified as Hayri Hamdan, a member of the PRC, and Tair al-Basiuni, of Islamic Jihad.
  - The other two were Muhamad Adwan, 20, and Muhamad al-Basiuni, 24, neither being a known member of any organization in the Strip.
  - 2 Hamas militants are killed in Beit Hanoun by IAF jets, which attacked the cell as they just fired Qassam rockets into Israel and were about to leave the area. 5 other members were wounded in the attack. They were known as Raji Hamdan and Mohammed Abu Rakba.

- September 27
  - A Qassam launching cell was spotted in the area while they were preparing to fire another Qassam rocket. Soldiers opened fire and killed one of them, the rest was able to flee. Military sources said they would keep the pressure on the launching cells the coming days.

== October ==
- October 1
  - 2 Palestinian gunman, who were advancing to the Israeli Gaza border fence overnight opened fire and threw a hand grenade at Israeli soldiers. The soldiers, who were outnumbering the gunman heavily returned fire and killed both the gunman. Both the gunman belonged to the military wing of Hamas.
- October 3
  - In an operation in Southern Gaza, in Rafah, IDF aimed to "destroy militants infrastructure," 2 Palestinian gunman were injured critically by a missile. One of them, Muhammad Hassan, succumbed later to his wounds and died. Both the gunmen were member of the armed wing of Hamas.
  - In Khan Younis, a Palestinian, Said al-Amur, is killed by IDF gunfire who were operating in the area. It is not known whether he was armed.
  - A Hamas member is killed while digging a tunnel under the Erez Crossing. The tunnel collapsed while he was inside.
- October 4
  - In the West Bank on Thursday night, Palestinians opened fire and hurled Molotov cocktails on IDF troops patrolling the Balata refugee camp in Nablus.
  - In Hebron, an explosive device was also detonated next to a police car.
- October 5
  - A Palestinian militant near the Israel-Gaza border fence fired at IDF troops after they identified him, and IDF troops returned fire and killed him. A bomb was thrown at the troops, but none were wounded in the exchange.
- October 7
  - After 6 weeks of being hospitalized in an Israeli hospital, a Palestinian civilian of Jenin dies of his wounds inflicted by IDF fire.
  - In a rocket barrage fired by Palestinian militants, 8 mortar shells, 3 Qassam rockets and 1 Katushya rocket landed inside Israeli territory. One studio was completely burned down by a mortar shell in Kerem Shalom. The Katushya rocket landed 400 meters from Netivot, 11 km away from the Gaza Strip. It was the first rocket to hit the Netivot area. Last week 10 Qassam rockets and 20 mortars hit the Negev. Nobody was injured in the attacks.
- October 10
  - A member of the Al Aqsa Martyrs Brigades is killed in the old part of Nablus by IDF troops operating in the area. Another member of AAMB was critically injured. Amar al-Anabusi was shot to death and Sufian Kandil, a prominent group member, was severely injured.
- October 11
  - Israeli Special Forces, operating in Jenin opened fire at a vehicle conducting Al Aqsa Martyrs Brigades members. IDF troops and Border Police killed a senior Tanzim member in Jenin overnight Wednesday, the IDF said. The target was identified as Mohammed Abu-Srur. Another militant was injured and arrested. The target, who had been planning to carry out militant attacks in Israel in the near future, aimed a pistol at the soldiers, who then shot and killed him. However, Palestinian officials said the man killed was a Palestinian policeman driving a wanted militant suspect. They said the Islamic Jihad operative he was driving escaped unharmed despite efforts by undercover soldiers dressed in civilian clothes.
- October 13
  - Israeli aircraft fired at a group of militants busy launching Qassam rockets near Beit Hanoun. The explosion killed one militant and injured 3 more. All the militants belonged to Hamas.
- October 16
  - 2 Palestinians are killed in a battle in the old quarter of Nablus an Al Aqsa Martyrs Brigade stronghold. IDF forces, operating in the area and were looking for wanted Palestinian militants. While detaining Palestinians, a small firefight erupted leaving one Palestinian militant, a local commander dead and 2 others wounded. A civilian was also killed as he ran out his house but was lethally hit by a bullet. It is not sure whether the bullet was shot by an Israeli or Palestinian.
- October 17
  - In a gun battle in Khan Younis, an IDF soldier from the Golani forces is killed by a single bullet. Dragged away from the battle injured, he died in an ambulance driving to the hospital in Beer Sheva. A Palestinian militant was killed by a tank shell in the same battle. 4 other militants and 2 civilians were injured in the battle. Hamas confirmed one of its fighters died, Hazam Asfor (20).
- October 19
  - An Islamic Jihad member and a fisherman are killed by the Israeli navy on their vessel. The Islamic Jihad militant was known as Mizar Abu Arab.
- October 22
  - IDF undercover elite forces dressed in civilian clothes killed 2 Palestinian Islamic Jihad militants in Jenin. The two were killed during an arrest raid, when they were about to be arrested they grabbed their guns but were killed in the firefight. An Israeli soldier was lightly injured by the two militants. They were known as Tarek Abu Ali and Khaled Houssein.
  - More than 15 Qassam rockets are fired into Israel on October 21 and 22, according to the IDF.
- October 23
  - A PRC commander of Qassam launching cells is killed by an IAF airstrike in the Strip. He was known as Mubarak al Hassanat and was an official in the Hamas-led government in the Gaza Strip. He was the main target of the airstrike, because of the large role of the PRC in the launching of mortars and Qassams on Israel.
  - Following the death of al Hassanat, 11 Qassam rockets and 8 mortars hit the Negev, leaving several people in shock.
- October 24
  - After a rocket barrage on the Western Negev, with 5 Qassam rockets and several mortars, IAF planes circled above the Gaza strip, looking for launching cells. One of the planes found a launching cell and fired a missile at the 5 militants. 2 were killed and 3 injured. All were members of the Palestinian Islamic Jihad. None of the rockets inflicted injuries, although a house was burnt down and two people suffered from shock in Sderot.
- October 25
  - IDF soldiers spotted 2 Hamas gunman near the fence. The reserve soldiers opened fire on them and killed both the gunman. Hamas confirmed 2 of its man were killed.
  - Ten Qassam rockets are launched causing no injuries nor damage.
  - An Islamic Jihad operative is killed while trying to plant explosive devices near the border fence. His comrade was nabbed and taken away for custody. It was further reported that the two were identified at Mohamed al-Khourdi, 20, and Mahmoud al-Abed, 24.
- October 26
  - Two gunmen near the northern border are spotted by a unit of Golani soldiers, who were operating inside the Gaza strip. In the following firefight the gunman were killed, and two soldiers were lightly injured by the Palestinians. After the attack, 2 Qassam rockets are fired into Israel, causing neither damage nor injuries.
  - In the Southern Strip, an Islamic Jihad gunman is taken under fire by a unit of reserve soldiers. The gunman immediately died.
  - A Hamas militant is killed by an IAF aerial attack. Another militant was seriously injured by the attack. Hamas said the airstrike happened near Gaza city.
  - 7 Qassam rockets are fired into Israel. One woman in Sderot suffers from shock.
- October 28
  - An IDF soldier of the reserve unit is killed in battle. Ehud Efrati was killed in the Gaza strip near the border fence in a fierce clash with Palestinian gunman. It happened near the Sufa Crossing. The unit was surprised by a Palestinian ambush. 2 other soldiers were injured. A Palestinian of the Hamas branch was also killed. He was known as Mohammed Abu-Tahoon. IDF said they shot another Palestinian, but did not know his condition.
  - Near Beit Hanoun, Palestinians fired an anti tank rocket at Israeli soldiers, seriously wounding a soldier. The militants were tracked by choppers and were taken under fire by a missile. A Palestinian gunman and a civilian died. During the operation, Palestinian gunman shelled a house were Israeli soldiers had sought shelter, leaving several soldiers lightly injured.
  - In the West Bank, a soldier was moderately injured by Palestinian gunfire.
- October 30
  - After a barrage of mortar shells, the IAF shelled a police building of Hamas in the Abasan village. 4 Hamas militants died in the attack.
  - After 4 Qassams are fired into Israel, IDF soldiers entered the strip and targeted a launching cell, but missed them. The missile slammed into a residence, injuring 6 Palestinian civilians.
- October 31
  - Mahmoud al Hajj is killed by IDF forces operating in the central Gaza Strip. He was killed in a gun battle near the border fence. Israeli forces often operate near the border fence in the Strip, trying to prevent Palestinian attacks and rocket attacks.
  - 8 mortars are fired into Israel, some of them are fired from a school yard. The IAF had them in sight, but could not fire, because they were fired from a schoolyard, an IDF statement reported.
  - Border Police catch an 18-year-old Palestinian youth who arrived at the junction leading to the Tomb of the Patriarchs in Hebron with concealed weapons and a letter proclaiming intent to die as a martyr.

== November ==
- November 1
  - 2 Hamas militants were noticed near the Northern Gazan border fence and were killed by Israeli soldiers.
  - An armed Palestinian was noticed near the Karni Crossing. Golani soldiers rushed in the Gaza Strip and killed the militant.
  - In an unprecedented rocket barrage, 8 mortars and 13 Qassam rockets are fired at the Western Negev within an hour.
- November 3
  - The Israeli aircraft targeted a Hamas police station run by the Executive Force, killing 1 Hamas militant. 2 other were injured in Southern Gaza aerial attack.
- November 4
  - 3 Qassams are fired into Israel, causing a blackout in Israel. Palestinian Islamic Jihad claimed responsibility.
  - Shortly after the firing, Israeli choppers and planes flew over the strip, targeting a launching and fired several missiles at the cell. 3 Palestinians were killed in the attack, and several others wounded. Palestinian doctors said all civilians, while Islamic Jihad said one of its members was killed and another clinically dead.
  - In a second strike, minutes later, IAF fired missiles at another launching squad, according to the IDF. 2 Palestinians died.
- November 15
  - 2 Qassam launchers, both members of the Fatah affiliated al-Aqsa Martyrs Brigade are killed by an IAF attack while launching Qassams.
- November 20
  - An Israeli resident of the West Bank settlement of Shavei Shomron is killed by Palestinians while driving in his car. Ivo Zoldan, 29, died in ambulance. The militants were able to flee the scene. A small offshoot of Fatah claimed responsibility.
  - 3 Palestinian militants tried to enter Israel by sneaking over the fence by night. They were spotted by Israeli forces, and 2 of them were killed. A third was able to flee into Gaza.
  - In the Southern Strip, 2 militants tried to plant explosives at the fence but were noticed. Both were killed in the ensuing firefight by the IDF. Both were Hamas militants.
- November 21
  - A rocket barrage of 5 Qassam rockets and 18 mortars hit the Western Negev, including several kibbutzim, Sderot and Ashekelon. A woman in Ashkelon was treated for shock.
- November 24
  - Two brothers, both in their forties, are killed while acting suspicious near the Israel-Gaza fence. Later, it became obvious 2 civilians were killed, while they were looking for scrap metal. They were hit by an artillery shell, meant for Qassam rocket-launchers.
- November 25
  - The IDF kills 2 Palestinian gunman in a clash in central Gaza near the border. Some militants came together several hundred meters from the fence, sparking an Israeli incursion in Gaza. A gun battle followed, leaving 2 militants dead. Both belonged to the PIJ faction.
  - A highly ranked commander of the al-Aqsa Martyrs Brigades is killed after Border Guard forces in the area tried to nab him. Another militant was wounded in the attack. The IDF operation came after AAMB killed an Israeli settler last week.
- November 26
  - A Hamas operative is killed as he and his cell were launching Qassams at Sderot. 3 Qassams landed inside Israeli territory, causing an IAF attack at the launchers, killing 1 and injuring 4 more.
  - Two Hamas militants are killed as they approach the border to plant explosive devices. They were noticed before they could plant them.
- November 27
  - The IDF killed 2 Hamas militants overnight.
  - IAF helicopters and planes bombed a Hamas post in Southern Gaza, after the militant group had fired at least 10 mortars into Israeli territory. A Hamas militant, who was inside the building when the planes attacked, was killed in the blasts.
  - Hamas militants approached the border and fired at Israeli vehicles driving near the border. No injuries were reported.
- November 28
  - 2 Hamas militants are killed when the IAF fired a missile at 2 heavily armed militants, who were talking with each other, not far from the border.
  - 2 more Hamas militants are killed when they were noticed while trying to plant a bomb at the fence by IDF soldiers. In the ensuing firefight they were killed. Both the incidents happened in the dark.

== December ==
- December 1
  - Five Palestinians, all Hamas militants are killed in two separate airstrikes in the Gaza Strip. After the strikes, Hamas threatened to strike deep into Israeli territory and to fire longer-range missiles.
  - A Palestinian gunman is killed, while crawling near the border. Three other gunman were wounded.
- December 2
  - A mortar barrage hits a kibbutz, causing some damage.
- December 3
  - A Hamas militant is slain after a battle with the Golani corps. The militant crawled to the border, but was noticed by IDF forces.
  - 3 more Hamas fighters are killed while trying to launch mortars near Beit Lahiya. They were killed by Armored Corps soldiers.
  - 4 IDF are hurt as a mortar explodes near their base, in Nahal Oz.
- December 4
  - 3 Hamas militants are killed as their training base was attacked in Deir el Balah by the IAF. The attack came after some mortars hit the Western Negev. Hamas claimed to fire back at the planes with machine guns, perhaps causing some damage.
  - A Palestinian gunman is killed while trying to reach the Kissufim crossing, but IDF forces noticed him.
  - A Negev home is accidentally hit by an Israeli bullet, but no one was injured. Later, IDF denied it had fired a bullet at Israeli territory. After investigation it became clear that the bullet was fired from the Gaza Strip, with a sniper rifle.
- December 5
  - 3 Hamas militants are overnight killed while launching mortars at Sderot. One of the mortars hit a residential building, causing a woman to be in shock and a lot of damage.
  - A PA officer is killed by IDF fire. Israeli undercover forces were operating in Bethlehem and looking for wanted Palestinians. PA forces mistook them for Hamas gunman and opened fire at the soldiers. The soldiers returned fire, killing an officer and wounding another.
- December 6
  - A Palestinian farmer is accidentally killed by IDF fire. He was acting on his fields near the border.
- December 11
  - In a huge operation inside the Gaza Strip, the biggest since the Hamas take-over in June, 6 Palestinians are killed and more than 60 detained. More than 30 tanks and bulldozers entered the Southern Gaza Strip, backed by helicopters and airplanes. 3 militants of the Palestinian Islamic Jihad are killed by an Israeli tank shell, while missiles killed 2 other gunman, it was not immediately clear to what faction they belonged. 4 Israeli soldiers were injured by Palestinian gunman, who fired several RPG missiles at the Israeli soldiers.
- December 12
  - The day after the operation, about 20 Qassams were lobbed into Israel, causing three lightly injured Israeli civilians. 15 people were treated for shock.
- December 13
  - Two more Qassams are fired into Israel, causing a moderately injured woman in Sderot. AAMB claimed responsibility.
  - Palestinians fired at Israeli farmers and soldiers from the Gaza Strip, causing no injuries.
  - Hours after the strike, Israel retaliated with an airstrike in the Gaza Strip, causing three deaths. IDF and Palestinian medics both confirmed all the deaths were militants. Palestinian Islamic Jihad confirmed they lost three of their men, but medics said the three belonged to the small Fatah offshoot which fired 2 Qassam rockets into Israel hours earlier. Later it became clear, that a top commander of the Palestinian Islamic Jihad, Sami Tafesh was killed, together with 2 members of the launching rocket squad of the Al Aqsa Martyrs Brigades.
- December 16
  - Shrapnel from a rocket lightly to moderately wounds a two-year-old boy. His mother is treated for shock. The rocket scored a direct hit on a house in Kibbutz Zikim.
- December 18
  - Three Palestinian Islamic Jihad militants are killed in two separate airstrikes, some high ranked commanders were among the killed. In the first attack, the target was top commander, and the chief for firing Qassam rockets in the Strip, Majed al Harazin. He and two other PIJ militants were driving in a vehicle, loaded with Qassam and mortars. All men inside the car died. According to a spokesman of the PIJ, Harazin was the chief of the PIJ Qassam squads and had not traveled for years because he feared being killed. He was wanted for nine years. The spokesman said his death would be revenged with suicide attacks and more rockets.
  - The second airstrike was aimed at a cell of PIJ militants who were trying to fire Qassam rockets into Israeli territory, to retaliate the death of their comrades. Two people died, and a second was seriously wounded. Later it became clear that one of the death was a top Qassam fabricator and commander, known as Karim Dahdouh.
  - Despite the air-attacks, militants of all groups were able to fire at least 15 Qassam rockets and mortars, causing only some damage.
  - In order to halt the rocket firing, IDF forces entered the strip looking for launching cells, but met fierce resistance from gunman in Jabalya. In the camp, 4 militants of the PIJ were killed in a fierce battle.
  - Another highly ranked commander from the PIJ was killed in the West Bank, Katabya. Tarik Abu al Ra-ali was killed when IDF soldiers noticed him. He was wanted for over 5 years.
  - In an airstrike at a Hamas post in Southern Gaza, 2 Hamas militants are killed.
  - A mortar shell lands near an IDF base north of the Gaza Strip overnight Tuesday, and six female soldiers are reported to have suffered from shock. One of the soldiers fainted.
  - Since the rocket firing began from Gaza in 2001, the police said, 13 Israelis have been killed and 307 injured by shrapnel, with many more suffering from shock and trauma.
  - A commando operation in the West Bank leaves an Islamic Jihad gunman dead.
  - Palestinians hurl rocks at the car of a civilian driver on route 443, which runs from Jerusalem to Modi'in. The man was driving a minibus used for the transport of handicapped children, and was treated for light injuries.
  - IDF forces fire and identify hitting Sami salid Rashid Zayud, an Islamic Jihad militant who planned a mass militants attack on a residential building in central Israel five years ago. He was taken to hospital for medical treatment.

- December 19
  - A Palestinian youth, aged 17, tries to stab one of the Israel Defense Forces soldiers stationed at the Hawara checkpoint in the West Bank
- December 20
  - Five Qassam rockets struck Israel at open areas near Sderot and Ashkelon. One of the rockets landed in a schoolyard in Sderot, where 12 pupils had to be treated for shock. The Code Red alert was alarmed and children ran to shelter to protect them from shrapnel.
  - After the barrage, Israeli forces entered the Central Gaza Strip in search for rocket launchers, killing 6 Palestinians. Palestinian gunmen launched mortar shells at troops and fired at Israeli aircraft with machine guns as Israeli snipers took up positions on the roofs of homes in the area. Three militants were from Islamic Jihad, 2 from Hamas, and 1 from the Popular Resistance Committees. 20 Palestinians are wounded, including a cameraman from Reuters. A Palestinian anti-tank rocket severely injures an Israeli soldier. At least three other soldiers are lightly wounded.
- December 25
  - 2 Hamas militants are killed in their vehicle as Israeli airplanes dropped a missile at their car. 4 men were in the car, 2 survived. It happened near the al Bureijj refugee camp.
- December 27
  - Around 01:00 PM, Israeli forces entered the Southern Gaza Strip, looking for Qassam launchers and infrastructure. This action took notice of several Hamas and Islami Jihad militants, who rushed to the scene, but were sensed by Israeli drones. Three of them were killed in a pretty fierce battle, in which several anti-tank missiles and anti-aircraft missiles were fired at Israeli forces, and Palestinian militants were shelled by Israeli artillery. Four Palestinian militants were wounded. All the dead belonged to the armed wing of Hamas.
  - IAF planes fired a missile at a car fully loaded with rifles, rockets and other weaponry. At the moment of the strike, three persons were in the car; only one was killed. Two others and three bystanders were also hurt. The persons and weapons belonged to the Palestinian Islamic Jihad, meant to be used to fire rockets at Israel and hurting Israeli soldiers, the group said. Later another PIJ succumbed to his wounds.
  - Another top-ranked commander from the PIJ is killed in a missile strike. Muhammad Abu Abdullah was killed while driving in his car with other PIJ militants. He was the PIJ leader of Central Gaza and was killed, together with 2 of his comrades. Several other Palestinians were wounded in the attack.
  - A bodyguard of Ahmed Qurei, a top-ranked Palestinian politician, is killed by IDF forces south of Ramallah. The bodyguard, Muatassem a-Sharif, was a close bodyguard of the IDF. The IDF reported that a-Sharif was also a weapons smuggler. A-Sharif was killed, according to eyewitnesses, when IDF forces in the area were looking for him for an arrest and tried to enter his house. At that moment a-Sharif opened fire at soldiers, but was killed in returning fire.
- December 28
  - 2 Israelis are killed near Hebron as they were off-duty for the army and were hiking with 2 other Israelis. The two, still in possess of their guns were attacked by a small group of 4 Palestinian Islamic Jihad gunman. A firefight followed, killing David Ruben and Ahikam Amihai. One of the two managed to kill one of the attackers and wound another. After the firefight, the two were still alive and the other hikers managed to hide the wounded. Both died later. After the attack, the IDF was searching in the area for the gunman, but were not able to find them.
- Israel Politik A blog by Israel's New York Consulate set up to present all aspects of the situation in Sderot to international media.
- Israel pledges more airstrikes in Gaza.

== See also ==
- Israel-Gaza conflict
