= Timeline of the Israeli–Palestinian conflict in 2006 =

- Timeline of the Israeli–Palestinian conflict
- 2005; 2006; 2007

This page is a partial listing of incidents of violence in the Israeli-Palestinian conflict in 2006.

- IDT = Israeli (civilians/soldiers) killed by Palestinians; cumulative
- PDT = Palestinians (civilians/militants) killed by Israelis; cumulative.

== January ==
- January summary: 13 Palestinians killed by Israeli security forces in the Occupied Territories
- January 19: 20 injured in bombing at fast-food restaurant in Tel Aviv

== February ==
- February summary: 29 Palestinians killed by Israeli security forces in the Palestinian territories; 1 Israeli killed by a Palestinian man.
- February 5: 1 killed, 5 injured in stabbing attack by Palestinian on Israeli taxi bus en-route to Tel Aviv.

== March ==
- March summary: 15 Palestinians killed by Israeli security forces in the Palestinian territories; 1 Palestinian kills himself in Palestinian territories; 5 Israelis killed by Palestinians in the Territories; 2 Israelis killed in Israel by Palestinian militants (rocket).
- March 1: 1 killed in shooting attack at gas station near Migdalim, West Bank.
- March 28: 2 killed (incl. 1 child) in explosion of Qassam rocket found in western Negev area.
- March 30: 4 killed (incl. 1 child) by suicide bomber posing as Jewish hitchhiker, in Kedumim in Occupied Territories.

== April ==
- April summary: 31 Palestinians killed by Israeli security forces in the Occupied Territories; 1 Palestinian kills himself in Israel; 6 Israeli civilians killed by Palestinians in Israel; 10 others killed by a Palestinian in Israel.
- April 17: 11 killed (including 2 Romanians, 1 French citizen, 1 US citizen and 1 dual Israeli-French citizen), over 60 injured by suicide bomber outside a fast-food restaurant in Tel Aviv after being prevented by a security guard from entering.
- April 23: Two Palestinian fighters, Daniel Saba George and Arafat Mahmoud of the Al-Aqsa Martyrs’ Brigades, were killed by the IDF in Bethlehem.

== May ==
- May summary: 36 Palestinians killed by Israeli security forces in the Occupied Territories
- Gaza Zoo in Rafah reportedly damaged.

== June ==
- June summary: 41 Palestinians killed by Israeli security forces in the Palestinian territories; 2 Palestinians detained by Israelis in Palestinian territories and taken to Israel; 1 Israeli captured by Palestinians in Israel and taken to Gaza; 64 members of the Palestinian Legislative Council detained by Israeli forces and held in Israel as of October 24, 2006.
- June 9: In the Gaza beach explosion, Israeli artillery shelling kills 8 Palestinians.
- June 10: The militant Hamas group calls off its truce with Israel, after seven civilians are killed in the Gaza Strip. More than seventy Qassam rockets were launched at Israeli towns by Hamas militants since Friday morning, wounding Palestinian and Israeli civilians alike.
- June 24, 03:30–04:30 local time, near Rafah: Ali Muamar is beaten by Israeli soldiers, his sons Osama and Mustafa Muamar are detained and taken to an undisclosed location in Israel, and Ali Muamar is treated in hospital.
- June 25: Palestinian militants infiltrate Israel through a secret tunnel and start a gunbattle at a military checkpoint – 2 Israeli soldiers and 3 Hamas militants are killed and an Israeli soldier is reported as missing and is later found out to have been captured by the militants. Israeli PM vows a fierce military response to the attack once the soldier, Gilad Shalit, is returned. Two infantry brigades and supporting armoured regiments are deployed along the Gaza Strip border, in preparation for a major offensive.
- June 28: Israel starts a military operation in the Gaza strip, deploying a large number of tanks, APCs and troops in order to rescue the soldier captured in the attack three days before that.
- June 29: Israeli troops detain one third of the Palestinian government and altogether 64 members of the Palestinian Legislative Council, who are Hamas members.

== July ==
- July summary: 177 Palestinians killed by Israel security forces (1–15 July: 97 in the Palestinian Authority territories);
- 12 July: An Israeli air strike destroys the Palestinian Foreign Ministry Building in Gaza City. An Israeli brigade enters the central Gaza Strip via Kissufim crossing, aiming at temporarily bisecting it. Simultaneously, the Israel Air Force targets a meeting of Hamas operational wing commanders in an apartment building in Gaza City. One Hamas leader, seven members of his family and one neighbor are killed. Top Hamas leaders Mohammed Deif and Abu Anas al-Ghandour, who Israeli officials claim were heavily involved in the kidnapping of Cpl. Gilad Shalit, are moderately wounded. Fourteen additional Palestinian militants are killed in other incidents in the Gaza Strip.
- 14 July: Hamas militants launch 5 Qassam rockets at the Israeli town of Sderot, causing local electrical malfunctions. Israeli ground forces pull out of the central Gaza Strip, after several days of fighting in which about 30 Hamas militants were killed. Israeli forces remain in Gaza airport near Rafah, to thwart the delivery of kidnapped soldier Gilad Shalit into Egypt. About 1,500 Palestinians cross the Gaza-Egypt border after Palestinian militants attack Egyptian policemen stationed at Rafah border terminal, blowing a hole in the wall near it.
- 15 July: Two Hamas militants killed in two Israeli air strikes in the Gaza Strip, one of them on a house in Gaza City.
- 16 July: Three Palestinian militants are killed in an Israeli airstrike, soon after Israeli forces re-entered the Gaza Strip.
- 17 July: Hamas militants launch ten Qassam rockets against Sderot and Ashkelon, causing damage in residential areas but no casualties. Israel Air Force strikes kill five militants and one civilian in the Gaza Strip. Israel Air Force strikes the Palestinian Foreign Ministry for a second time in a week, wounding 5 people.
- 19 July: At least nine Palestinians have been killed in fresh Israeli operations in Gaza and the West Bank.
- 28 July: The mutilated body of Dr. Danny Yaakovi, an Israeli physician, is found in the West Bank.
- 30 July: The United Nations compound in Gaza City is stormed and ransacked by Palestinians protesting the 2006 Israel-Lebanon crisis. Members of the Islamic Jihad militant group threw stones and fired assault rifles. Eight vehicles were damaged and five people were wounded.

== August ==
- 10 August: An Italian tourist is stabbed to death by a Palestinian affiliated with Palestinian Islamic Jihad in the Old City of Jerusalem.
- August 19: An Israeli citizen is shot and killed by a Palestinian in Bkaot in the Bikaa region in Israel.

== November ==
- 23 November: Fatma Omar An-Najar detonated explosives she was wearing on a belt and injured several Israeli soldiers near Beit Lahia and the Jabalia Camp.

== See also ==
- 2006 Franco–Italian–Spanish Middle East Peace Plan
