= Timeline of the Israeli–Palestinian conflict in 2008 =

In 2008, Israel sought to halt the rocket and mortar fire from Gaza that killed four Israeli civilians that year. In addition, Israel insisted that any deal include an end to Hamas's military buildup in Gaza, and movement toward the release of Corporal Gilad Shalit. Hamas wanted an end to the frequent Israeli military strikes and incursions into Gaza, and an easing of the economic blockade that Israel has imposed since Hamas took over the area in 2007.

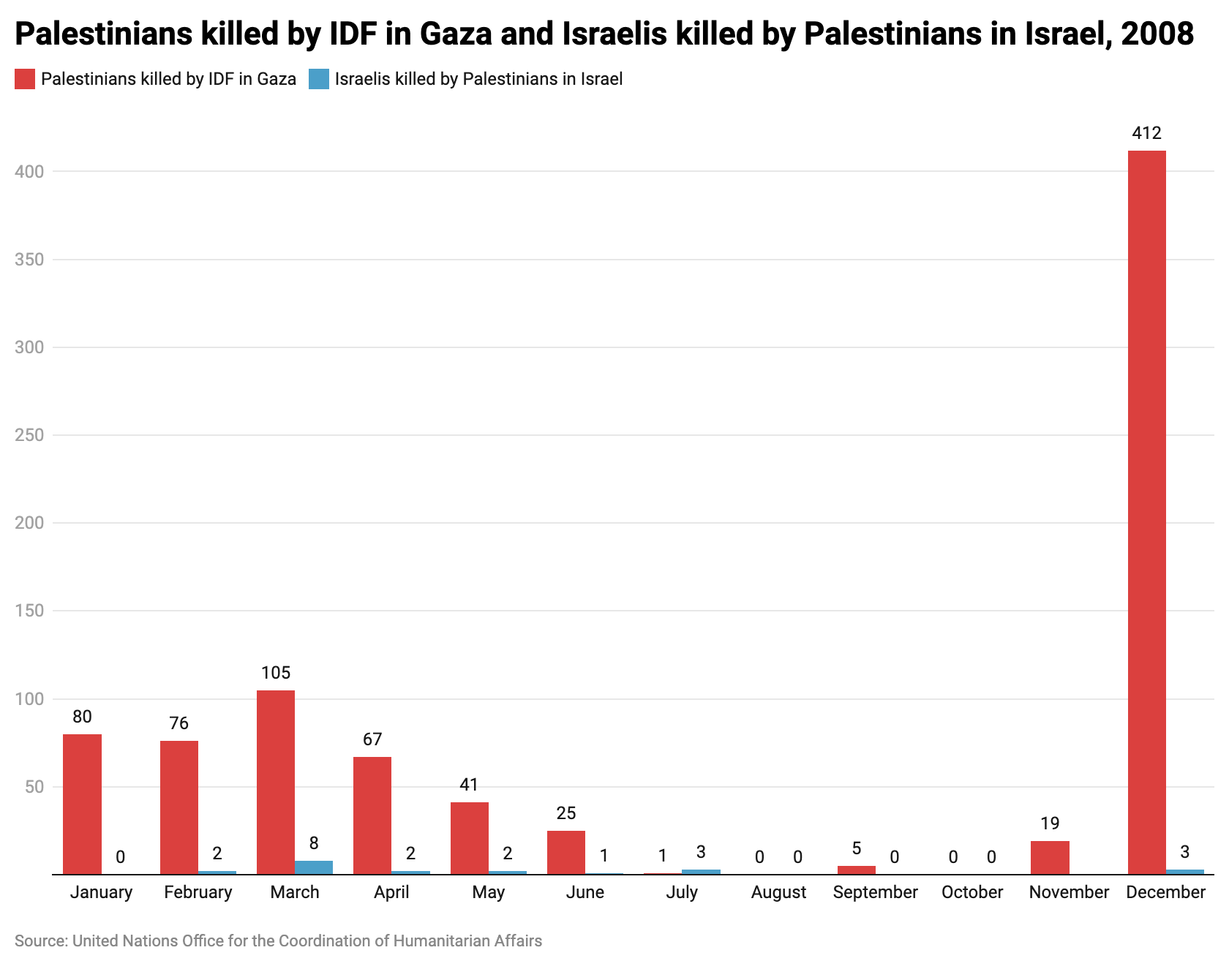
Israelis killed by Palestinians in Israel (blue) and Palestinians killed by Israelis in Gaza (red) during 2008

== January ==
=== January 2 ===
- Six Palestinians belonging to three militants factions were killed Wednesday morning in a joint Israeli air and ground action in the Gaza Strip near Gaza City. The five Palestinians, four from Hamas and one belonging to the Popular Resistance Committees, died when Israeli ground forces called in air support after the Palestinians fired anti-tank rockets at the soldiers. The sixth, a member of Fatah's Al Aqsa Martyrs Brigades, died in a gun battle with Israeli troops.

=== January 3 ===
- Israel sends aircraft and tanks to hit buildings used by extremists. Most were in Khan Yunis. In one clash, the IDF shelled a house in the city, killing an Islamic Jihad militant along with his mother, sister, and daughter. His brother was also killed and possibly affiliated with IJ. Israeli army spokeswoman Capt. Noa Meir said militants were intentionally using civilian areas to fire at troops and blamed them for the deaths. Twelve Palestinians were killed, two to four of them civilians.
- The Palestinians responded to Israel's airstrikes with a barrage of seven Qassam rockets, one of which hit the yard of a house in the town of Sderot. 25 other rockets were also fired by Palestinians at Israeli towns and forces in the Western Negev.
- In Nablus, Israel Defense Forces troops discovered two rockets-in-process, in an arms cache belonging to Hamas.

== February ==
=== February 4 ===
- Dimona attack one suicide bomber detonates his bomb, killing an elderly woman. An accomplice is killed by police. Hamas claims responsibility.
- Meanwhile, a Qassam rocket hit a western Negev open field Friday morning. No damage or injuries were reported.

=== February 5 ===
- An 8-year-old boy and his older brother were seriously wounded Saturday when a rocket from Gaza slammed into the Israeli border town of Sderot. Their mother and a third brother were brought to the hospital suffering shock.

=== February 7 ===
- A 38-year-old teacher was killed and three 16-year-old pupils were injured when Israeli forces opened fire on an agricultural school in Beit Hanoun. In a separate incident, Israeli forces exchanged fire with Hamas, killing six Palestinian militants.

=== February 25 ===
- Palestinian militants fire five Qassam rockets at Israeli towns, one of which fell near a school in Shderot; 10-year-old Yossi Chymov was critically injured in the attack.
- Two armed Palestinian militants are killed and three others injured by an Israeli aircraft attack in Khan Yunis. Shortly after, one armed militant was killed and two others injured in another attack, this time in North Gaza.

=== February 27 ===
- Over 46 Qassam rockets are fired by Palestinian militants at the Western Negev, many of them hit the City of Ashkelon and the Town of Sderot among other towns and villages in the area. One of the rockets that landed in a parking lot at the Sapir College killed 47-year-old student Ronni Yechia. Another rocket had a direct hit at a factory lunch-room, the room was destroyed. The factory owner, Yossi Chugi, said: "A lot of damage has been done here. It is a miracale that tens of people weren't killed here today, if it would have hit during lunch time it would have been a disaster."
- After a meeting with Israeli Prime Minister Ahud Olmert in Tokyo, U.S. Secretary of State Condoleezza Rice said that "We were all sorry about the death of the Israeli university student and affirmed to him (Olmert) that we will continue to state clearly that the rocket attacks against Israel need to stop,"

=== February 29 ===
- In response to longer-range rocket attacks, Israeli forces launched Operation Hot Winter. It run from February 29 through March 3. At least 112 Palestinians and three Israelis were killed, and more than 150 Palestinians and seven Israelis were injured.

== March ==
=== March 6 ===
- Mercaz HaRav massacre: Eight Israeli civilians were killed and nine wounded when a Palestinian Arab attacker opened fire at a Jewish seminary in Jerusalem.

=== March 18 ===
- An Islamic Jihad fugitive was killed at Kafr Saida, north of Tulkarm, in an operation by the anti-terrorist squad.
- Israeli commandos kill four armed militants in a car on the West Bank, three are from Islamic Jihad.

=== March 27 ===
- Israeli soldiers on a raid in the West Bank arrested the Hamas mastermind of the bloodiest suicide bombing of the Palestinian uprising, a 2002 attack that killed 30 people and wounded 143 others during a Passover celebration.

The military said Omar Jabar planned the attack at the Park Hotel in the coastal city of Netanya. The attack was a turning point in the conflict, spurring Israel's military to launch a broad offensive and retake control of West Bank cities. Also Wednesday, Gaza militants shot and lightly wounded an Israeli farmer in his kibbutz's fields near the border fence, according to the Israeli military. Militants also launched more than 10 rockets into Israel, but there were no casualties, the military said.

== April ==
=== April 1 ===
- Israeli forces killed two Hamas militant in a pre-dawn raid and gunfight in Gaza.
- On Monday, an Israeli shot dead a Palestinian in the occupied West Bank whom the army said tried to stab Jewish settlers at a bus stop. A Palestinian security source said the man killed was a civilian not affiliated with any militant group and denied he attempted to attack Israelis.

=== April 2 ===
- Earlier in the day (Wednesday), a Hamas militant and an Israeli soldier also were killed in clashes in southern Gaza.
- Militants from the Gaza Strip slipped across the border and opened fire at a fuel depot in southern Israel on Wednesday, killing two Israeli civilians in a brazen daylight raid. Two attackers were subsequently killed and two escaped back into Gaza.
- The Israeli government held Gaza's Hamas rulers responsible for the attack and sent tanks, troops and aircraft into the Palestinian territory. At least seven additional Palestinians died during the day.

=== April 16 ===
- Three Israeli soldiers were killed in an ambush when troops exchanged gunfire with Palestinian gunmen who were making their way toward the border between Gaza and Israel, just south of the Nahal Oz crossing, an army spokesman said.
- Reuters cameraman as Fadel Shana, 23 and two bystanders were killed near El Bureij in Gaza during fighting
- Ten other Palestinians – five militants and five civilians – were killed near El Bureij in Gaza during fighting according to Hamas security forces.
- Four Hamas members were killed when soldiers entered northern Gaza in a routine operation against militants, an Israeli military spokeswoman said.
- Hamas security sources said an earlier airstrike killed a Palestinian farmer in northern Gaza near Beit Lahiya. The Israeli military said its aircraft fired at armed men entering a car, hitting one of them.

=== April 18 ===
- A member of Hamas's military wing was killed in an IDF strike in northern Gaza on Friday night, according to Palestinian security officials. The man has been identified as 22-year-old Imad Abu-Amar.

=== April 19 ===
- Hamas used two suicide jeeps to attack an at the Kerem Shalom crossing point with Gaza. Thirteen soldiers were wounded and four Hamas militants were killed.
- A subsequent airstrike killed one Hamas militant.
- Later Saturday evening, another missile strike killed four Hamas militants east of Gaza City, Palestinian medics and security officials said. The Israeli military confirmed the strike, and said it targeted a group trying to launch rockets

=== April 24 ===
- A Palestinian gunman killed two 50 year old plus security guards yesterday at an Israeli industrial park near the West Bank border that employs Palestinian workers and whose name means "buds of peace."

=== April 25 ===
- Israeli forces entered a northern Gaza of Beit Lahiya early Saturday and seized a local Hamas leader (Talat Hassan Marouf) from his home amid heavy fighting with Palestinian gunmen, Hamas militants and a Palestinian health official said. The wanted man's 14-year-old daughter was killed in the clashes and his wife wounded. Another nine fighters were injured.

=== April 28 ===
- Several Israeli armored personnel carriers had entered the area of Beit Hanoun in what was described as a routine search for rocket launchers, and snipers . Two heavily armed men approached the Israelis, leading an Israeli aircraft to shoot a missile at them, killing them.
- The Israelis believe that rucksacks carried by these two fighter apparently had large amounts of explosives, which detonated causing a nearby house to collapse, killing a mother and her four young children. Palestinian witnesses said they believed an Israeli tank shell or a missile from an unmanned drone flew into the small house, killing the four as they were eating breakfast. Two other children from the same family were badly wounded and hospitalized. However, video of the incident photographed by UAV showed that the family was killed from secondary explosions of the militants' weapons and not from the airstrike.

=== April 30 ===
- Hours after Palestinian factions announced their acceptance of an Egyptian-brokered cease-fire proposal on Wednesday, the Israel Air Force bombed a rocket-manufacturing plant in the Gaza Strip. Gazans said one person was killed and three were wounded in the strike on a metal workshop in the southern town of Rafah. The Islamic Jihad militant group identified the dead man as one of its local commanders. One Palestinian witness said three helicopters hovered over the town and were fired at by Palestinians on the ground before the air strike took place. The military said no aircraft were hit. Also on Wednesday, the IDF imposed a full closure on the West Bank that will last through Holocaust Remembrance Day and end late Thursday evening. The IDF said it would allow Palestinians to enter Israel but only on a humanitarian basis and with approval from the civil administration.
- Close to 20 Kassam rockets pounded the western Negev on Wednesday, with one scored a direct hit on the yard of a home south of Ashkelon, causing light damage and sending a woman into shock. She was taken to Barzilai Hospital. Earlier, a rocket struck near a school in Sderot, the second such incident in two days. On Monday, a Kassam slammed into a schoolyard in the city. No one was wounded in either attack.

== May ==
=== May 1 ===
- An Israeli air strike in the southern Gaza Strip (Rafah) killed a Hamas leader (Nafiz Mansur) who was involved in the capture of a soldier (Corporal Gilad Shalit) two years ago and numerous other attacks, the army said. Palestinian security officials confirmed Mansur's identity as a commander in Hamas, the Islamic movement that controls Gaza.

=== May 6 ===
- An Israeli air strike aimed at armed militants in the Gaza Strip killed one Palestinian gunman and wounded three others on Tuesday, hospital officials and the Israeli army said. The strike on the group near the town of Beit Lahiya in the northern Gaza Strip was aimed at a mortar launching squad close to the border fence with Israel, Gaza medics said.

=== May 9 ===
- Gaza attackers sent mortar shells crashing into a border community late Friday, killing an Israeli in his garden and wounding three others, officials said. Israel retaliated with missile strikes that left five Hamas militants dead. The surge in violence added pressure on Egyptian-led attempts to halt clashes between Gaza militants and the Israeli military. Gaza's ruling Hamas movement claimed responsibility for the deadly mortar fire on Kfar Aza, a communal farm in southern Israel.
- Hours later, Israeli aircraft fired missiles that slammed into two Hamas police stations in southern Gaza, killing five militants, Hamas and Gaza health officials said. The Israeli military confirmed the airstrike and said it was responding to attacks on Israel, including the deadly mortar fire on Kfar Aza.
- In other violence Friday, a 21-year-old Palestinian man was shot dead in a clash with Israeli settlers north of the West Bank town of Ramallah. The Israeli military confirmed a shooting involving settlers and an armed Palestinian man, but had no further details. According to Israeli media, settlers said the Palestinian man fired at them and they shot back. Palestinian villagers said he apparently was hunting when the settlers killed him.

=== May 12 ===
- A rocket launched by Islamic Jihad from the Gaza Strip killed an Israeli woman on Monday when the house she was in took a direct hit, Israeli emergency services and the army said.

=== May 14 ===
- A Katyusha rocket fired to the Israeli city of Ashqelon struck a clinic in the third floor of the Huzot shopping mall. This attack resulted in three people seriously injured (of which an eight-year-old girl), two moderately injured and eleven people suffered minor wounds. The Popular Front for the Liberation of Palestine-General Command said its fighters launched the rocket.

== June ==
=== June 2 ===
- Seven Qassam rockets and four mortars hit the western Negev desert. Five people were hurt, including two Bedouin farmhands, a farmer and two Thai migrant workers.

=== June 6 ===
- An Israeli man was killed and four other people were wounded yesterday when Hamas militants in the Gaza Strip fired a mortar shell at a kibbutz in the western Negev desert. Amnon Rosenberg, 51, who had three children, died when the shell landed outside a paint factory at the Kibbutz Nir Oz. The other casualties were hit by shrapnel. Not long after the attack, a six-year-old Palestinian girl was killed and her mother wounded as Israeli warplanes launched a strike on the militants suspected of firing the mortar. A missile missed its target and landed in the garden of the family's home in Gaza.

=== June 8 ===
- Four Palestinian shepherds were assaulted Sunday evening by masked assailants near the West Bank settlement of Susya in the south Mount Hebron area. The Palestinians claim the assailants were Jewish settlers. According to Palestinian news agency Wafa, among the victims was a 68-year-old woman who was evacuated to Beersheba's Soroka Medical Center in serious condition. The remaining victims, including the woman's 70-year-old husband, sustained mild injuries and were treated by IDF paramedics at the scene. Hebron police were scouring the area in search of the attackers. Some two months ago a bruised-up Palestinian teen told soldiers manning a checkpoint in the south Mount Hebron area that he was beaten by a settler with a rod as he was passing near Susya.
- Earlier on Sunday the IDF removed 10 roadblocks in the south Mount Hebron region in accordance with Defense Minister Ehud Barak's order to ease restrictions on Palestinian residents of the West Bank. Security sources told Ynet that the lifting of roadblocks would allow terrorists to travel more freely throughout the West Bank.
- The al-Quds Brigades fires four rockets toward southern Israel, lightly injuring a Thai foreign worker.

=== June 10 ===
- Hamas fires 18 mortar shells toward Israel, and shortly after the attacks Palestinian sources reported that three Hamas operatives were killed and a number of others were wounded in an Israel Air Force strike in the Gaza City neighborhood of Sajaiya. The sources reported the men were part of a special unit of Hamas' military wing, the Izz al-Din al-Qassam Brigades. The mortars, which were fired in two separate salvos, landed in open areas near Nahal Oz.

=== June 11 ===
- Factory workers were evacuated from the area after a fire erupted as a result of two mortars from Gaza landing. 1 man is lightly wounded from shrapnel.
- An Israeli military spokesman said a ground force had attacked Palestinian militants in the central Gaza Strip who had been attempting to fire rockets into Israel from a built-up area. Palestinian workers say a girl inside a house was killed by tank fire. The Israeli spokesman said he was unaware of any civilian casualties.
- Altogether, four Palestinians were killed on Wednesday by IDF troops, two of them identified as Hamas and Islamic Jihad operatives and two were reported as being civilians.

=== June 12 ===
- Since the early morning hours gunmen have been exchanging fire with Israeli forces in the Beit Lahiya region in the northern part of the Strip. IDF kills three Palestinian gunmen. IDF spotters identified two gunmen approaching the border fence opposite an Israeli town with the apparent intent of planting an explosive device on the fence. Infantry troops who crossed the border to scan the area were able to locate one of the gunmen, who was killed a short time later by a tank shell. The troops continued searching the region and spotted the second gunman, charged towards him and killed him with small arms fire. These two were members of the al-Aqsa Martyrs' Brigades, the military wing of Fatah, and killed in the Beit Lahiya region in northern Gaza.
- As Israel's Gaza-vicinity communities were hit with dozens of mortars and rockets, Palestinian militants reportedly attempted to infiltrate the country with an explosives-laden vehicle. IDF soldiers identified a bulldozer approaching the security fence in northern Gaza at an alarming speed, not far from the Israeli community of Netiv Ha'asara. At some point the bulldozer came to a halt about and a man was seen stepping out of it and fleeing the scene. The troops proceeded to open fire and hit the man.
- Seven Palestinians are killed and 40 more wounded in a large explosion in northern Gaza on Thursday afternoon. Palestinian witnesses Hamas sources and initially blamed the blast on an Israeli airstrike and Hamas then unleashed rockets and mortar shells at southern Israel, but later said the blast was accidental. Hamas said two of the seven people killed were senior operatives from the organization: Hassan Abu-Shakfa, one of the organization's commanders in northern Gaza, and Ashraf Mushtaha, another of Hamas' senior operatives. The incident occurred in the home of Ahmed Hamouda, who is a member of the Izz al-Din al Qassam Brigades, the military wing of Hamas. However the IDF made clear no forces had launched an attack in the area. Military officials said the army was looking into whether the explosion may have been the result of ammunition detonation, but estimated it most likely appeared to be a Palestinian 'work accident.'
- A 59-year-old Israeli woman was lightly-to-moderately wounded in the Yad Mordechai area on Thursday afternoon as Palestinian militant groups launched a barrage of mortar shells and Qassam rockets against Israeli communities near the Gaza border. At least 40 mortars and 25 Qassams landed in Israel, primarily in the Hof Ashkelon Regional Council, a number of fires have broken out as a result. A member of Kibbutz Nahal Oz told Ynet that residents have currently been instructed to remain in bomb shelters and fortified rooms. One of the mortars landed in Palestinian territory near the Erez crossing, lightly injuring a Palestinian. Magen David Adom paramedics asked to treat the wounded man but were denied access. In addition, a missile, apparently of a type "Grad" landed near Ashkelon. No injuries were reported but a number of people suffered from shock.
- Israel carried out an airstrike aimed at a Gaza rocket squad, killing a Palestinian militant. Two other Israeli military operations in Gaza killed five more militants.

=== June 17 ===
- The prime minister and defense minister of Israel have agreed to an Egyptian-brokered cease-fire with Hamas for the Gaza area starting Thursday, June 19.
- Israel carried out three airstrikes in Gaza against what the military described as "terrorist operatives." Six Palestinian militants were killed. On Tuesday night, militants launched up to 10 rockets at Israel. Several fell in open areas around the Israeli border town of Sderot. Islamic Jihad said four of the dead belonged to its military wing. But the Israeli military listed three of those killed as members of the Army of Islam. The military identified one of the dead as Muataz Dagmush, 29, a senior member and a brother of the leader of the group.

=== June 18 ===
- The military said at least 40 rockets and 10 mortar shells exploded in Israel by nightfall. Islamic Jihad claimed responsibility for much of the rocket fire, saying it was to avenge Israeli airstrikes that killed 10 militants in the previous two days. Israel hit back with two more airstrikes, wounding two Palestinians, according to Hamas security officials, at least one of which was a Hamas militant. One of the militant rockets exploded in Ilan Basherim's greenhouse at Moshav Yesha, not far from Gaza.

=== June 20 ===
- 3 Israeli hikers were wounded in a drive-by shooting near Neve Tzuf, in Wadi Zarka, north of Ramallah. The Israel Defense Forces and police believe a militant ambushed the hikers and shot them when they came within range. One hiker sustained moderate to serious injuries, another was moderately wounded, and a third was lightly hurt. The al-Aqsa Martyrs' Brigade claimed responsibility.

=== June 28 ===
- Israeli soldiers entered the village of Beit Umar, near Hebron, late Friday in an operation to stop fire bomb attacks on Israeli vehicles on a nearby highway, the military said. The troops shot a militant who threw two molotov cocktails at them, a military spokesman said. Palestinians said the shots killed Mohammed Alameh, 17, one of a group of youths who fought the soldiers. There was no indication that Alameh was a member of a militant group and no immediate sign of retaliation from Gaza Saturday morning.

== October ==
During October 2008 Israel-Palestinian violence fell to its lowest level since the start of the al-Aqsa intifada in September 2000. Several Israeli violations were reported: In South Gaza on 3 October the IDF fired on two unarmed Palestinians near the border and sent soldiers into the strip to arrest them and detain them in Israel. On the 27 October IDF soldiers fired into Gaza for unknown reasons damaging a school in Khuza and injuring one child. Palestinian fishing boats off the Gaza coast were fired upon on four separate occasions during the month wounding two fisherman. Throughout the month of October 2008 a single Palestinian violation was reported: 1 rocket was fired into Israel causing no damage or injuries. At the end of the month the American secretary of state Condoleezza Rice sent a message to Hamas acknowledging their efforts to keep the peace.

== November ==
Since violence flared on November 4, Israeli forces and militants, some of them from Hamas, engaged in almost daily tit-for-tat exchanges. In about ten days since the November 4 incident, eleven militants were killed and about 140 rockets and mortars were fired from Gaza at Israel. On November 16, four Popular Resistance Committees fighters were killed by an Israeli airstrike as they fired mortars at Israel. On November 17 Hamas leaders went underground amid Israeli targeting threats.

== December ==
Throughout December 12 - December 15 period, five Qassams and two mortar shells fired from northern Gaza landed in Israel's western Negev.

On December 16, eight Qassam rockets were fired at Israel from the Gaza Strip. On December 17, twenty three Qassam rockets landed in the western Negev.

Throughout December 20, at least 15 Qassams and 26 mortars were fired toward the western Negev region. The Israeli air force attacked several targets in the Gaza Strip, including a weapons storehouse in the Jabalya refugee camp, a rocket factory in Khan Yunis and a Hamas border police post, wounding two Hamas members.

On December 23 night Israeli soldiers killed three Hamas gunmen. The army said the men were preparing to plant explosives along the border.

On December 26, Israel reopened five border crossings between Israel and Gaza, after an eight-day closure, to supply fuel for Gaza's main power plant and to provide about 100 truck loads of humanitarian aid, including grain and other goods. On that day, militants fired approximately a dozen rockets and mortar shells from Gaza at Israel; one accidentally struck a northern Gaza house, killing two Palestinian sisters and wounding a third. According to Israeli Ministry of Foreign Affairs (IMFA), the commercial crossings into Gaza Strip were mostly closed since November 6, due to the barrage of approximately 230 rockets and mortar that were launched at Israel. IMFA stated that the Erez crossing has continued to be open to international and medical traffic.

== See also ==
- Israel-Gaza conflict
- Gaza War (2008–09)#Background
- 2007–2008 Israel-Gaza conflict
- 2008 Israel-Gaza conflict
- Breach of the Gaza-Egypt border (2008)
- Operation Hot Winter
- List of rocket and mortar attacks in Israel in 2008
- Timeline of the Gaza War (2008–2009)
- Rocket and mortar attacks on southern Israel
- Israeli casualties of war
