= Israeli casualties of war =

Overview of Israeli casualties during armed conflict

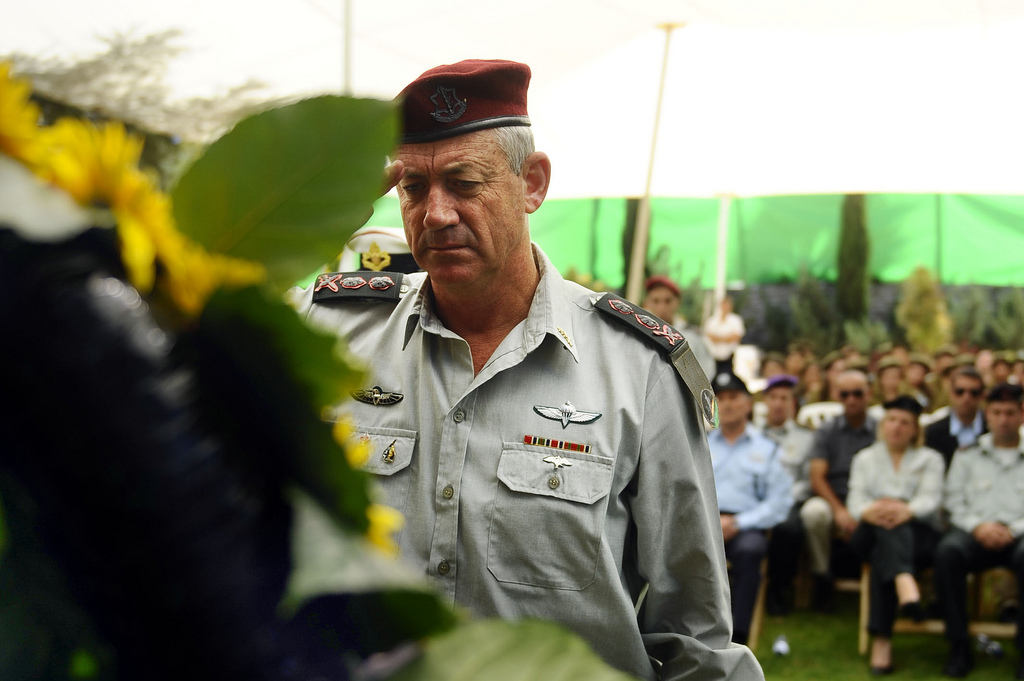
Israel Defense Forces Former Chief of Staff Lt. Gen. Benny Gantz salutes Yom Kippur War casualties at an official annual memorial service for fallen soldiers.

Israeli casualties of war, in addition to those of Israel's nine major wars, include soldiers and security forces personnel killed in "miscellaneous engagements and terrorist attacks", which includes security forces members killed during military operations, by fighting crime, natural disasters, diseases, traffic or labor accidents and disabled veterans whose disabilities contributed to their deaths. Between 1948 and 1997, 20,093 Israeli soldiers were killed in combat, 75,000 Israelis were wounded, and nearly 100,000 Israelis were considered disabled army veterans. On the other hand, in 2010 Yom HaZikaron, Israel honored the memory of 22,684 Israeli soldiers and people of the Yishuv killed since 1860 in the line of duty for the independence, preservation and protection of the nation, and 3,971 civilian terror victims. The memorial roll, in addition to IDF members deceased, also include fallen members of the Shin Bet security service, the Mossad intelligence service, the Israel Police, the Border Police, the Israel Prisons Service, other Israeli security forces, the pre-state Jewish underground, and the Jewish Brigade and the Jewish Legion (which served in the British army in World War II and World War I respectively).

According to the Israeli Ministry of Foreign Affairs and the Anti-Defamation League, a total of 1,194 Israelis and foreigners were killed and 7,000 wounded between September 2000 and August 2010 by Palestinian terror attacks (most of them during 2000–2005 Second Intifada); while more than 3,000 Israelis have been killed and 25,000 have been wounded as a result of Palestinian violence and hostile enemy action (without including wars) since the establishment of the state of Israel in 1948 until today. Another 685 Jewish residents of Mandatory Palestine were killed between 1920 and 1947 as a result of Arab riots, British anti-Zionist operations and World War II attacks. Palestinians killed 1,074 Israelis and wounded 7,520 between 2000 and 2005.

The following tables summarize Israeli casualties by war, conflict, or incident.

== Prior to Israel's founding ==
=== Conflicts with Arabs ===
Conflicts prior to Israel's independence	Military deaths	Civilian deaths	Total deaths	Military and/or Civilian wounded	Total casualties
Battle of Tel Hai	0	6	6	0	6
1920 Nebi Musa riots	0	5	5	216	221
1921 Jaffa riots	0	47	47	146	193
1921 Jerusalem riots	0	5	5	Unknown	Unknown
1929 Buraq riots	0	133	133	339	472
1933 Palestine riots	0	0	0	Unknown	Unknown
1936–1939 Arab revolt	0	415+	415	1,200+	1,615
Jewish insurgency in Mandatory Palestine*	At least 34 members of Palmach	Unknown	50–100	Unknown	Unknown
1947–1948 civil war in Mandatory Palestine	895	408	1,303+	2,000	3,303
*Conflict was against the British

=== Sinking of ships carrying Jewish immigrants ===
In the White Paper of 1939 the British government limited Jewish immigration to Palestine to 75,000 over the following five years. European Jews were anxious for ways to leave Europe, but for the most part there were few options. No countries were willing to take Jewish immigrants. However, some Eastern European states were willing to give transit visas. During World War II, many countries denied or severely limited Jewish refugees fleeing the Holocaust, and Palestine was one of the few destinations available.

In post-Holocaust Europe, the 1,000,000 Jewish survivors were classified as "non-repatrifiable" by the Austrian and German government. In other words, Jews were not "officially allowed to leave the countries of Central and East Europe" by the allied powers, nor were they permitted to settle in Palestine by the British.

An unknown number of Jewish refugees perished en route from European ports to Palestine, and over 30,000 holocaust survivors who successfully immigrated were interned by the British in POW camps. Many immigrant ships were sunk during the British blockade.

Note: Graph is not comprehensive

Casualties attributed to Britain's naval blockade of Mandatory Palestine	Deaths	Survivors
SS Patria (sunk by the Jewish paramilitary group Haganah)	260	1,510
MV Struma (sunk by Soviet submarine in the Black Sea in World War II)	785	1
SS Bulgaria	280	70
MV Mefküre (sunk by Soviet submarine in the Black Sea in World War II)	345	5
SS Exodus	3	4,512

== Regular conflicts ==
Bold indicates conflicts considered wars by the Israeli Ministry of Defense (as they were named by Israel): Italic indicates ongoing conflicts.

Conflict	Military deaths	Civilian deaths	Total deaths (not including foreigners)	Military and/or civilian wounded	Total casualties
**1948 Arab–Israeli War**	4,000	2,400	6,400	15,000	21,400
1951–1955 fedayeen attacks including Retribution operations	Unknown	Unknown	400-967	900-1,300	1,300–2,267
1956–1967 fedayeen attacks	Unknown	Unknown	178	1,574+	1,752+
1968–1987 fedayeen attacks	Unknown	Unknown	567	Unknown	Unknown
**Sinai War** (1956)	172	0	172	899	1,072
1966 attack on Samu (1966)	1	0	1	10	11
**Six-Day War** (1967)	776	20	796	4,517	5,293
**War of Attrition** (1967–71)	1,424	227	1,651	2,700	4,251+
Palestinian insurgency in South Lebanon (1968–1982)	Unknown	Unknown	Unknown	Unknown	Unknown
**Yom Kippur War** (1973)	2,656	0	2,656	9,000	11,656
1978 South Lebanon conflict (1978)	18	0	18	113	131
**First Lebanon War** (1982–1985)	657	10	667	6,500	7,167
**Security Zone in Lebanon Campaign** (1985–2000)	256	90	636	1,200	1,836
First Intifada 1987–1993	60	100	160	500	660
Palestinian political violence 1993–2000	170	99	269	400	669
Second Intifada (2000–2008) including Operation Defensive Wall, 2004 Israeli operation in Rafah and 2004 Israeli operation in the northern Gaza Strip (fatalities since the outbreak of the Second Intifada and until the 2008 Gaza War)	332 (Note: Including police officers)	731	1,063	8,800	9,863
2000–2006 Shebaa Farms conflict	16	7	23	19	42
**2006 Lebanon War**	121	44	165	2,067	2,237
Gaza War (2008–2009)	10	3	13	518	531
Current Palestinian and foreigner violence in Israel and the Palestinian Authority and Gaza Strip (since 19 January 2009) including the 2012 Gaza War (excluding the 2014 Gaza War and the 2021 Israel–Palestine crisis)	18	52	70	322	392+
2010 Israel–Lebanon border clash, Hanikra border clash and Golan clashes	4	1	5	17	22
2014 Gaza War	67	5	72	530	602
2021 Israel–Palestine crisis	1	10	11	119	130
**Gaza war**	829 (Note: Including: 59 Israel police officers, and 10 Shin Bet personnel who died in Israel and Gaza, and additional 8 security forces who died in operations in the west bank during the war. also Including additional 11 IDF soldiers and 7 police officers killed by Palestinian attacks in Israel and the west bank)	888	1,717	25,836 (Note: including at least 5,705 soldiers (as of 8 feb. 2025))	
**Israel–Hezbollah conflict (2023–2024)** and **2024 Israeli invasion of Lebanon**	87 (Note: IDF casualties:) (Note: The number includes 7 IDF killed in Lebanon and the North of Israel from operational accidents)	46	133	25,836	

== Terror and other attacks 1968–1987 ==
Note: Table is not comprehensive

Terrorism and other attacks 1968–1987	Military deaths	Civilian deaths (including foreigners)	Total deaths	Military and/or Civilian wounded	Total casualties
El Al Flight 253 attack (1968)	0	1	1	1	2
Popular Front for the Liberation of Palestine attacks Athens Airport following the El Al Flight 426 hijacking.	0	1	1	1	2
September 1968 Tel Aviv bombings	0	1	1	71	72
November 1968 Mahaneh Yehuda car bomb attack	0	12	12	52	64
February 1969 Jerusalem bombing	0	2	2	20	22
October 1969 Haifa apartment bombings	0	4	4	20	24
February 1970 El Al bus attack	0	1	1	8	9
13 February 1970 Swissair Flight 330 attack	0	47	47	unknown	47+
Avivim school bus bombing (1970)	0	12	12	25	37
Dawson's Field hijackings	0	0	0	1	1
1971 bombing Ben Yehuda attack	0	0	0	0	0
Sabena Flight 571 (1972)	5	0	5	1	6
1972 Lod Airport massacre	0	26	26	80 non-Israelis	106+
1972 Munich massacre	1	11	12	0	12
1974 Kiryat Shmona massacre	0	18	18	Unknown	18+
1974 Ma'alot massacre	0	27	27	78	105
Hijacking of TWA Flight 841	2	86	88	0	88
1974 bombing Ben Yehuda attack	0	0	0	13	13
10 February Munich airport attack	12	0	12	0	12
Savoy Hotel attack (1975)	3	8	11	Unknown	Unknown
1975 Ben Yehuda attack	0	15	15	77	92
April 1976 bombing Ben Yehuda attack	0	0	0	0	0
1976 bombing Ben Yehuda attack	0	0	0	33	33
Hijacking of Air France Flight 139, precipitating Entebbe raid	1	4	5	14	19
Coastal road massacre (1978)	1	38	39	71	110+
1979 bombing Ben Yehuda attack	0	1	1	13	14
1979 Nahariya attack	1	5	6	Unknown	Unknown
1980 Misgav-Am attack	1	4	5	15	25
1981 bombing Ben Yehuda attack	0	0	0	1	1
1982 Tyre suicide bombing	75	27	102	55	157
1983 Tyre suicide bombing	28	32	60	40	100
Bus 300 affair (1984)	0	1	1	7	8
1984 bombing Ben Yehuda attack	0	0	0	0	0
1985 Ras Burqa massacre	0	7	7	4	11
1985 Egypt Air attack	0	60	60	unknown	60
1987 Northern Border attack	6	0	6	8	14

== Attacks against Israeli diplomatic missions ==
Terrorist attacks against Israeli diplomatic missions	Israeli deaths	Other deaths	Total deaths	Israeli and/or foreigner wounded	Total casualties
1969 Israeli embassies attacks	0	0	0	3	3
1970 Israeli Consulate attack in Asuncion	1	0	1	1	2
1972 Israeli Embassy attack in Brussels	0	0	0	1	1
1972 Embassy attack in Istanbul	1	0	1	0	1
1972 Israeli Embassy employee attack in London	1	0	1	0	0
Bangkok Israeli embassy hostage crisis (1972)	0	0	0	0	0
1973 Israeli Embassy Air Force Attache attack in Washington	1	0	1	0	1
1979 Israeli Ambassador assassination attempt in Lisbon	1	0	1	3	4
1981 Israeli Embassy attack in Vienna	0	0	0	1	1
1982 Israeli Embassy Attache assassination in Paris	1	0	1	0	0
1982 Israeli Ambassador assassination in London	0	0	0	1	1
1982 Israeli Embassy Charge d'Affaires kidnapping attempt in Malta	0	0	0	1	1
Quito Israeli Embassy bombing (1982)	0	2	2	1	3
1982 Israeli Consulate attack in Sydney	0	0	0	2	2
1984 Israeli Embassy attack in Cairo	0	0	0	1	1
1984 Israeli Embassy Interest Section Chief attack in Colombo	0	0	0	0	0
1984 Israeli Embassy attack in Cyprus	0	0	0	0	0
1985 Israeli Embassy employee attack in Cairo	1	0	1	2	3
1986 Israeli Embassy employee attack in Cairo	1	0	1	3	4
1988 Israeli Embassy attack in Manila	0	0	0	0	0
1988 Israeli Embassy failed attack in Nicosia	0	Several policeman	Unknown	Unknown	Unknown
1992 Israeli Embassy employee assassination in Ankara	1	0	1	0	0
1992 Buenos Aires Israeli embassy bombing	4	25	29	242	271
1994 Israeli Embassy attack in Bangkok	0	1	1	0	0
1994 London Israeli embassy bombing	0	0	0	20	20
1997 Israeli Embassy attack in Amman	0	0	0	2	2
1998 Israeli Embassy failed attack in Brussels	0	0	0	0	0
Berlin Israeli consulate attack (1999)	0	0	0	0	0
2004 Tashkent suicide bombings	1	4	5	5+	10+
2008 Nouakchott Israeli embassy attack	0	0	0	3	3
2012 attacks on Israeli diplomats	0	0	0	4	4

== Suicide bombings ==
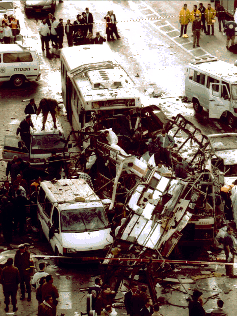
Aftermath of the Jaffa Road bus bombings. 26 people were killed in the Hamas suicide attack.

From 1993 to 2003, 303 Palestinian suicide bombers attacked Israel. More than 80% of all suicide bombings occurred after the year 2000. 55% of all suicide attacks were deemed "successful" – that is, resulted in killing themselves and injuring or killing others. Suicide bombings constituted just 0.5% of Palestinian attacks against Israelis in the first two years of the Second Intifada, though this percentage accounted for half of the Israelis killed in that period.

Year	Realized suicide bombing attacks	Killed	Wounded
1994	4	38	75
1995	4	35	150
1996	5	67	161
1997	5	24	359
1998	2	3	28
1999	2	0	0
2000	4	6	10
2001	35	85	323
2002	60	220	119
2003	26	142	105
2004	15	55	172
2005	7	23	63
2006	4	15	31
2007	1	3	0
2008	2	1	22

Between 2000 and 2006, 521 suicide bombing plots were thwarted by the Israel Defense Forces and 540 Israelis were killed by suicide bombings.

== Non-combat military casualties ==
171 Israeli soldiers have been killed in training exercises and non-combat roles since 1977.

== Wars ranked by total deaths ==
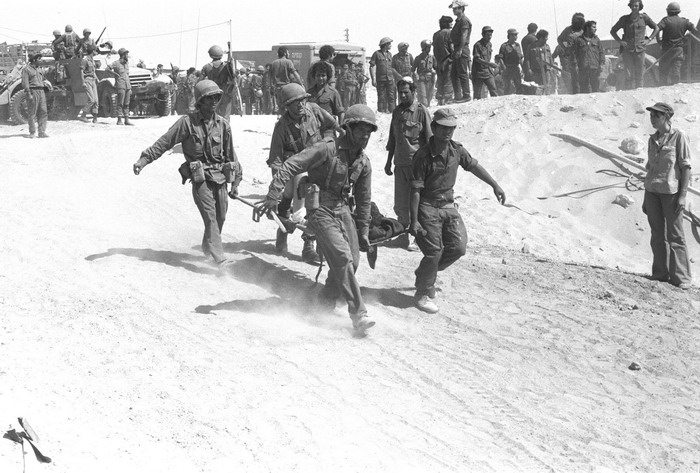
An IDF medical crew evacuating an injured soldier from the battle field during the Yom Kippur War. The Israel Defense Forces suffered 2,565 fatalities and more than 7,200 soldiers were injured.

1. 1948 Arab–Israeli War
2. Yom Kippur War
3. War of Attrition
4. Gaza war
5. Six-Day War
6. 1982 Lebanon War
7. Suez Crisis
8. 2006 Lebanon War

== Timeline chart ==
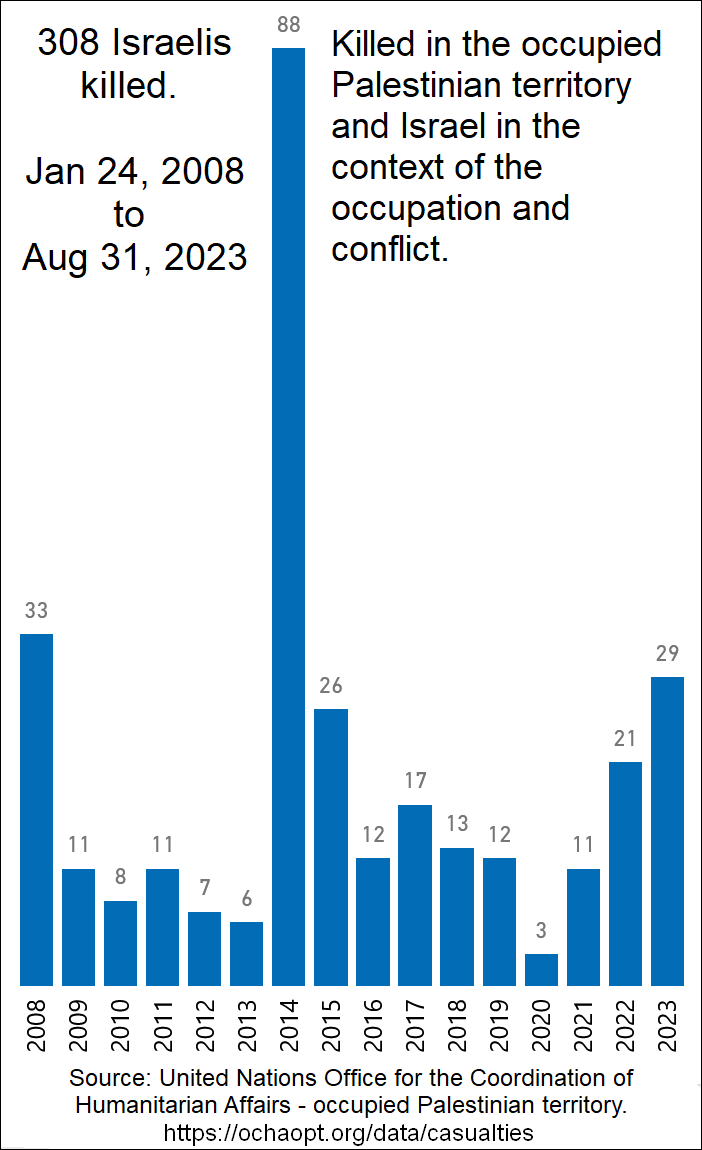
Israelis killed.

== Gallery of memorials ==
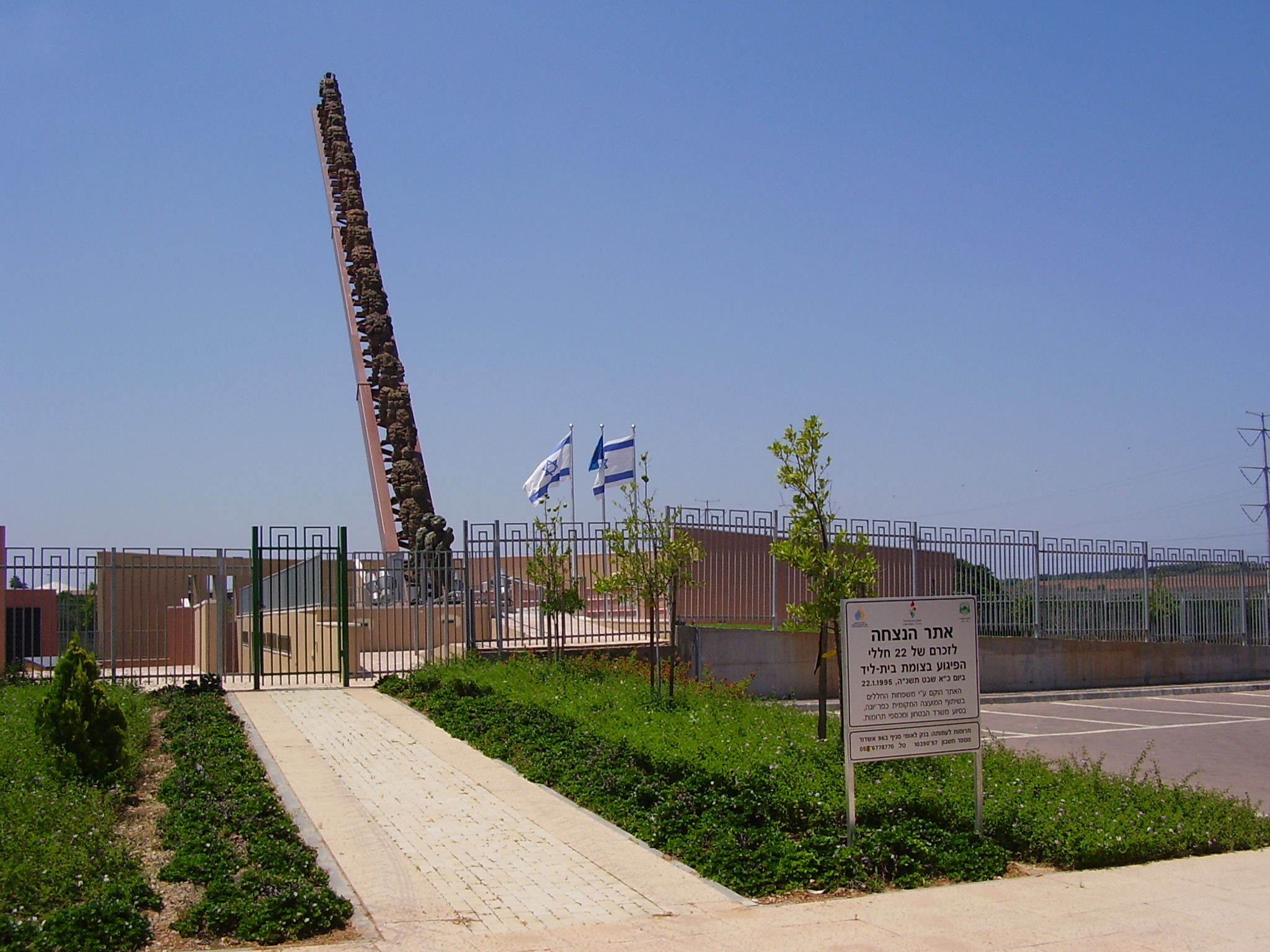
Beit Lid memorial

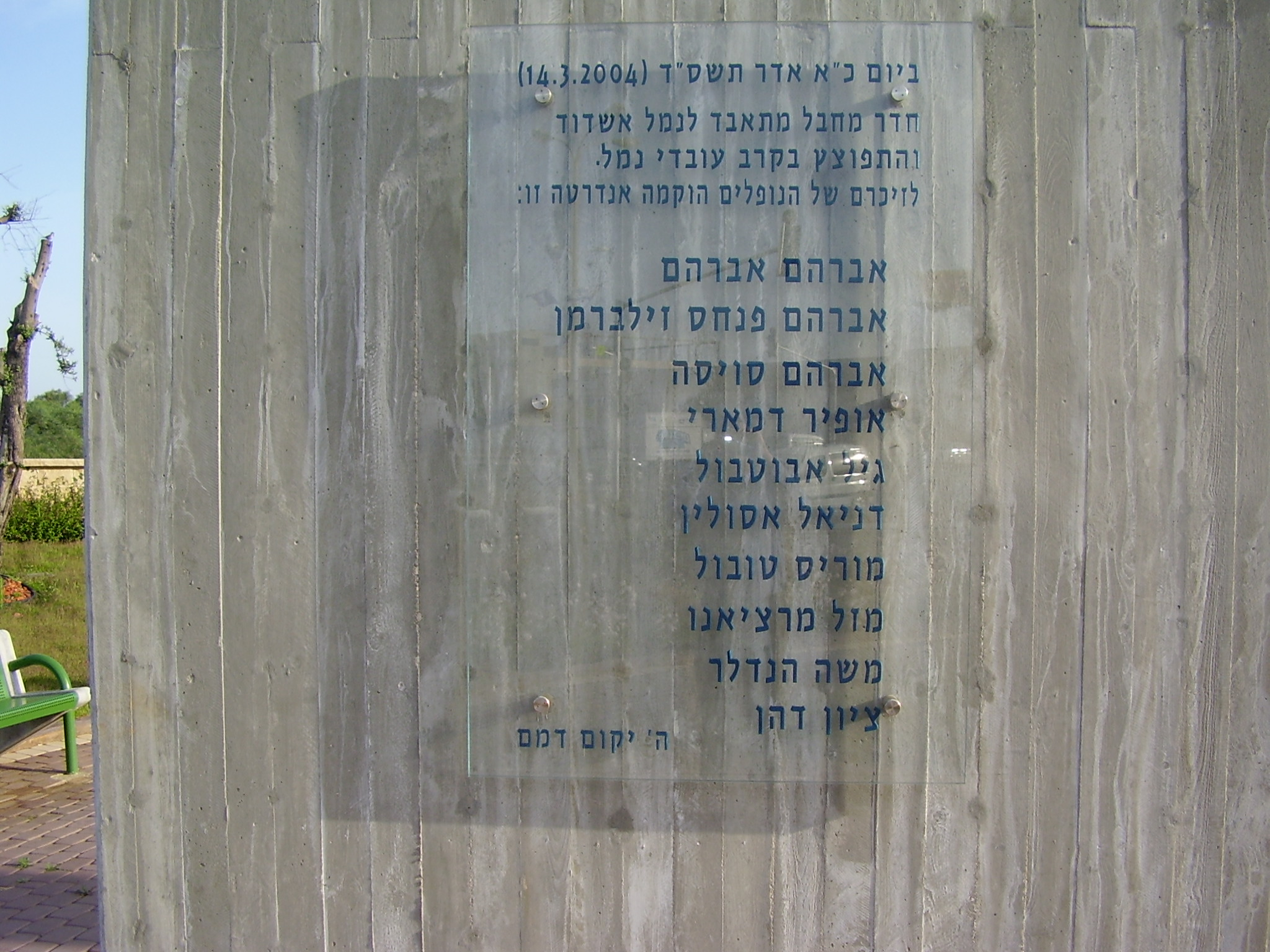
Ashdod Port memorial

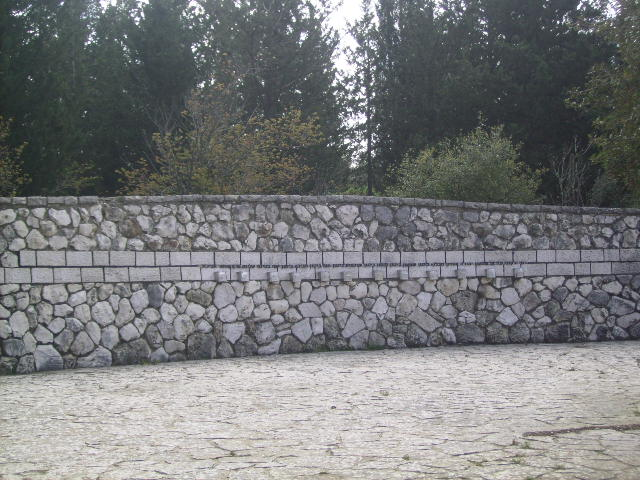
Avivim school bus memorial

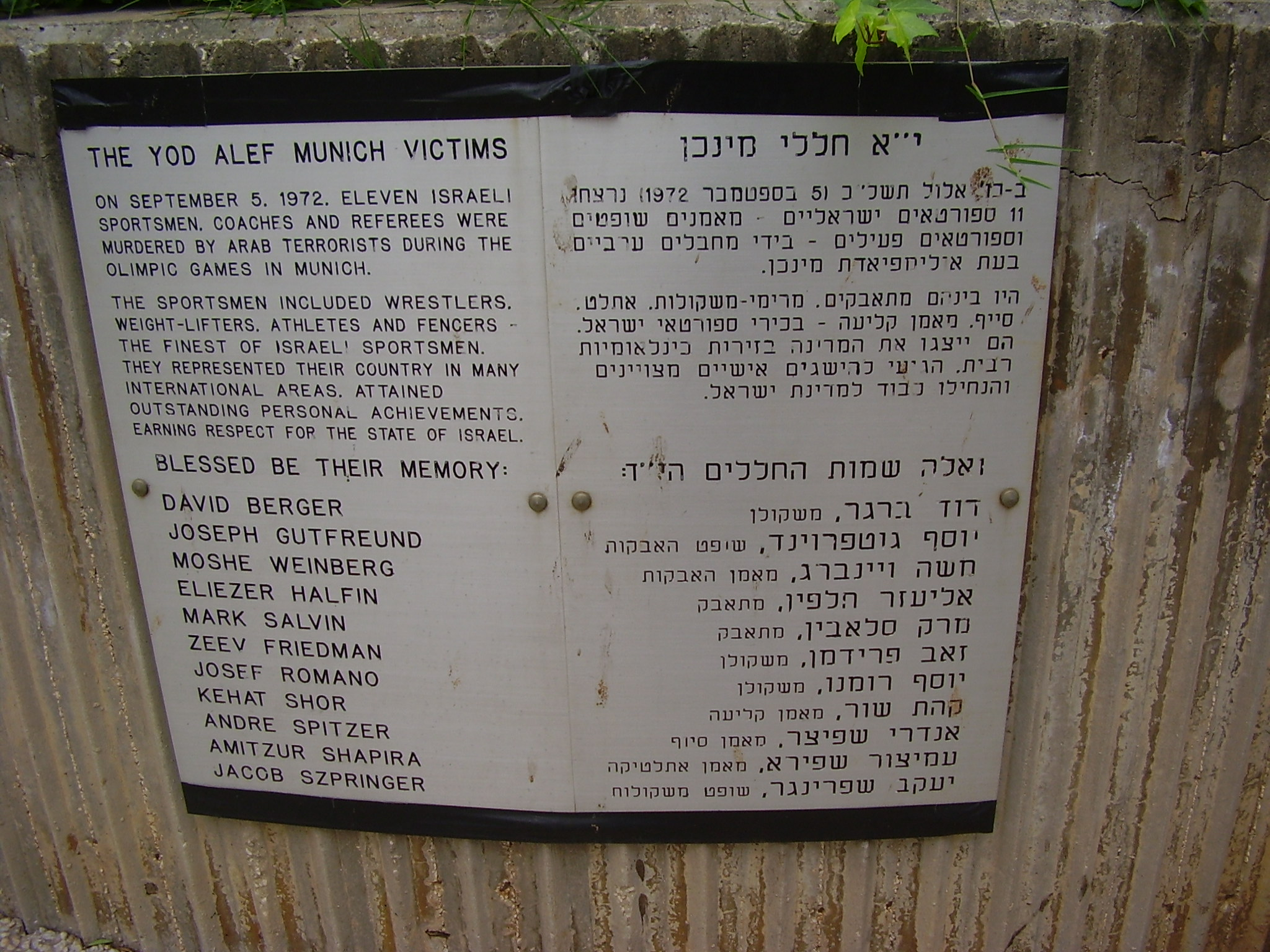
Munich massacre memorial

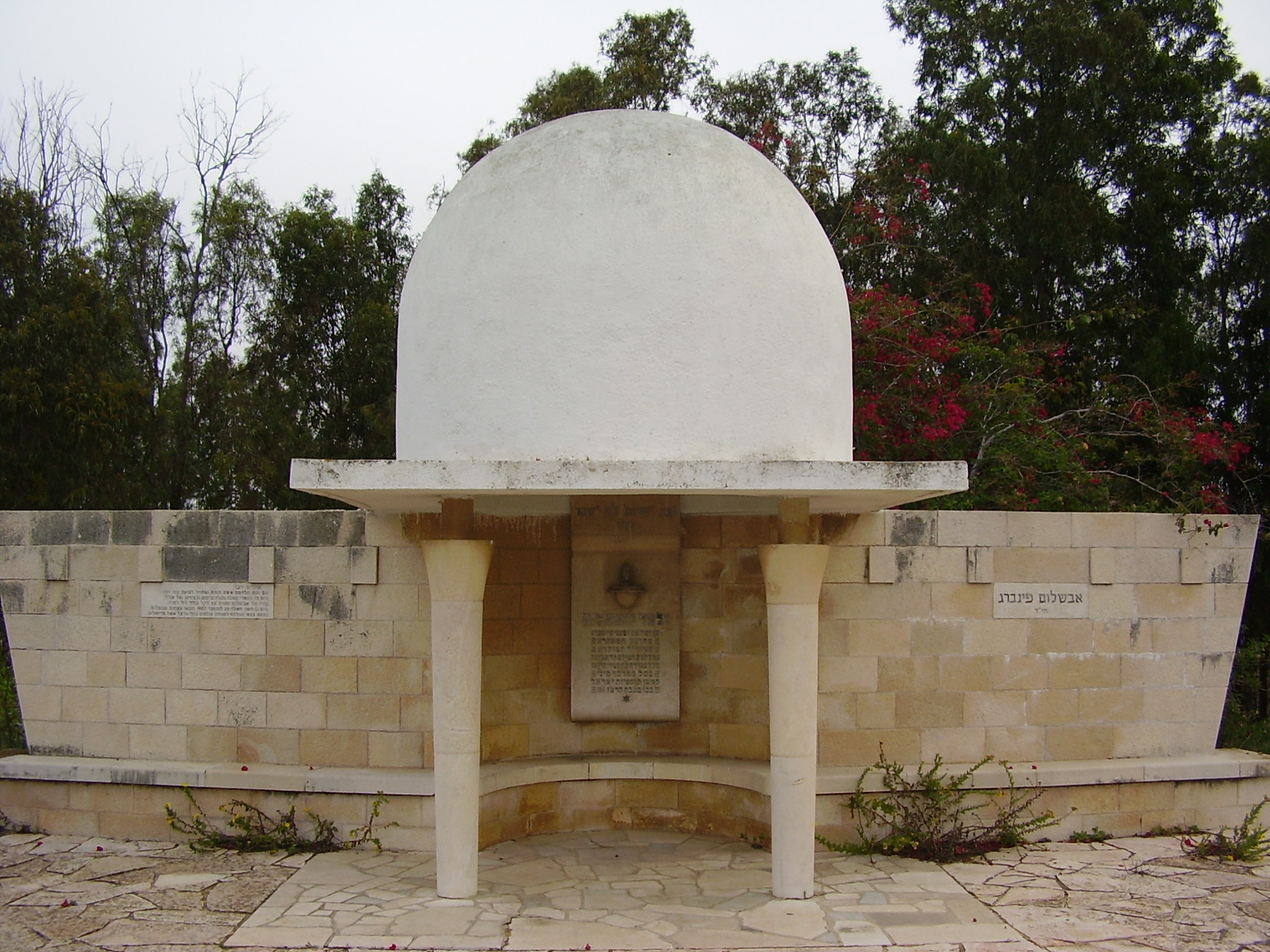
Avshalom Feinberg memorial

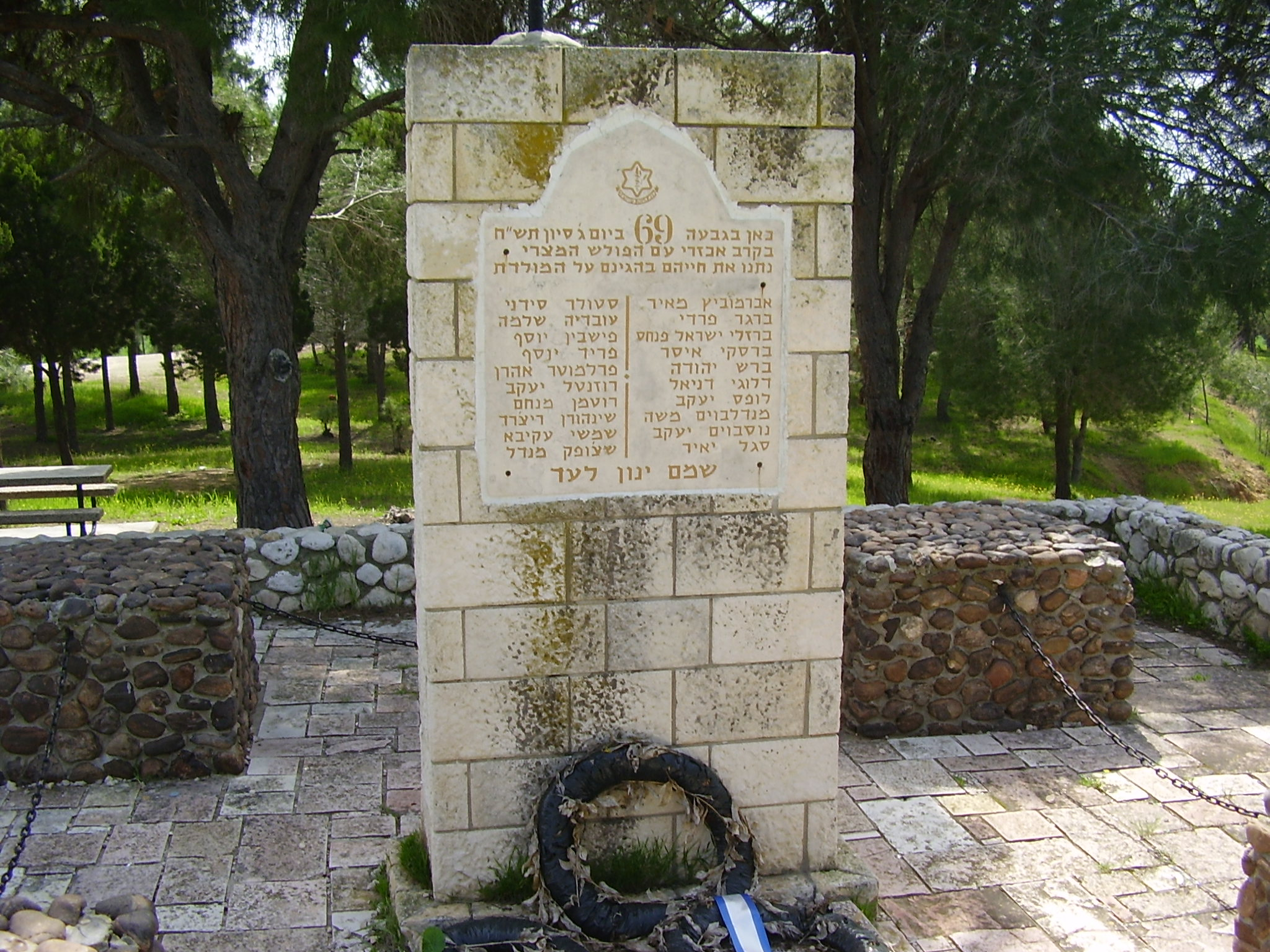
Hill 69 memorial

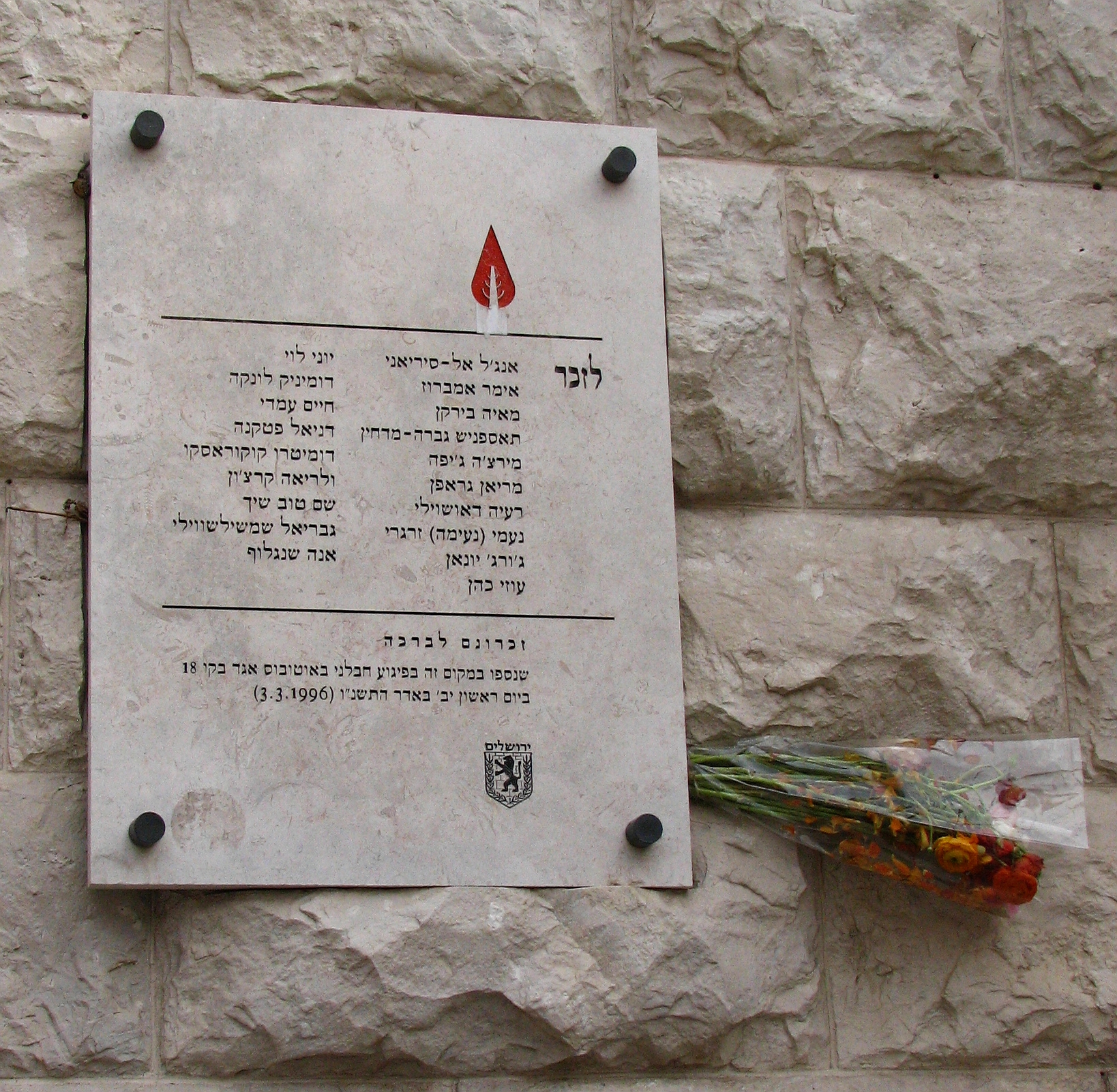
Jaffa Road bombing memorial

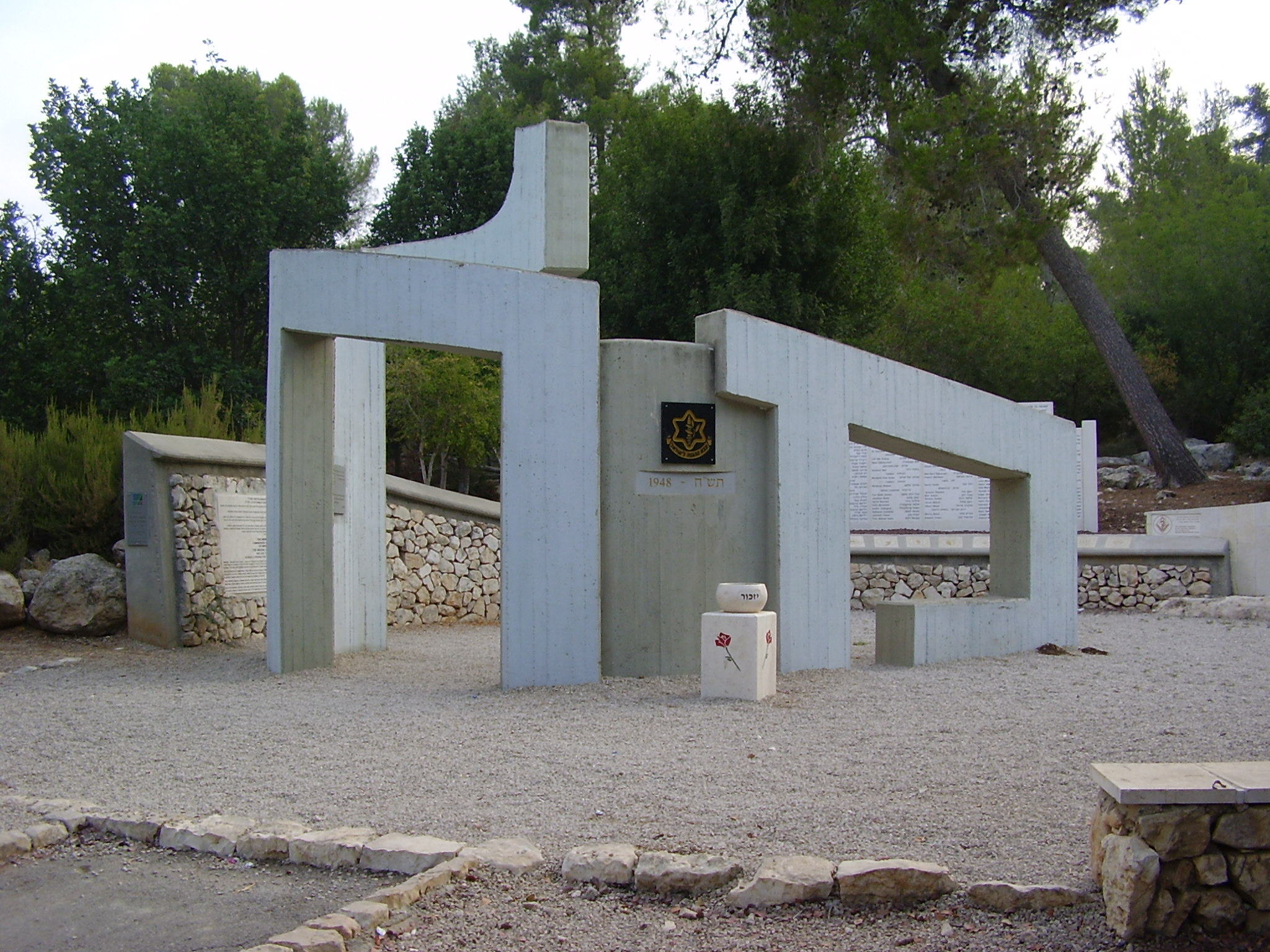
Mahal memorial

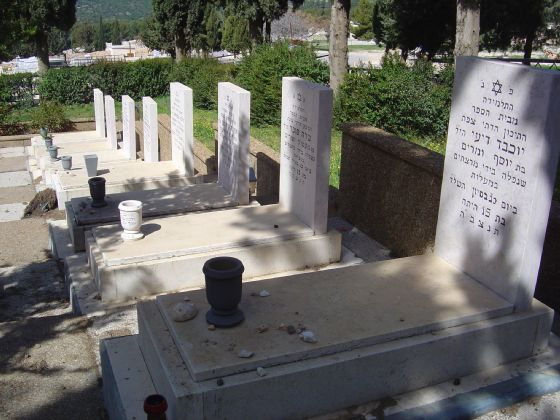
Ma'alot memorial

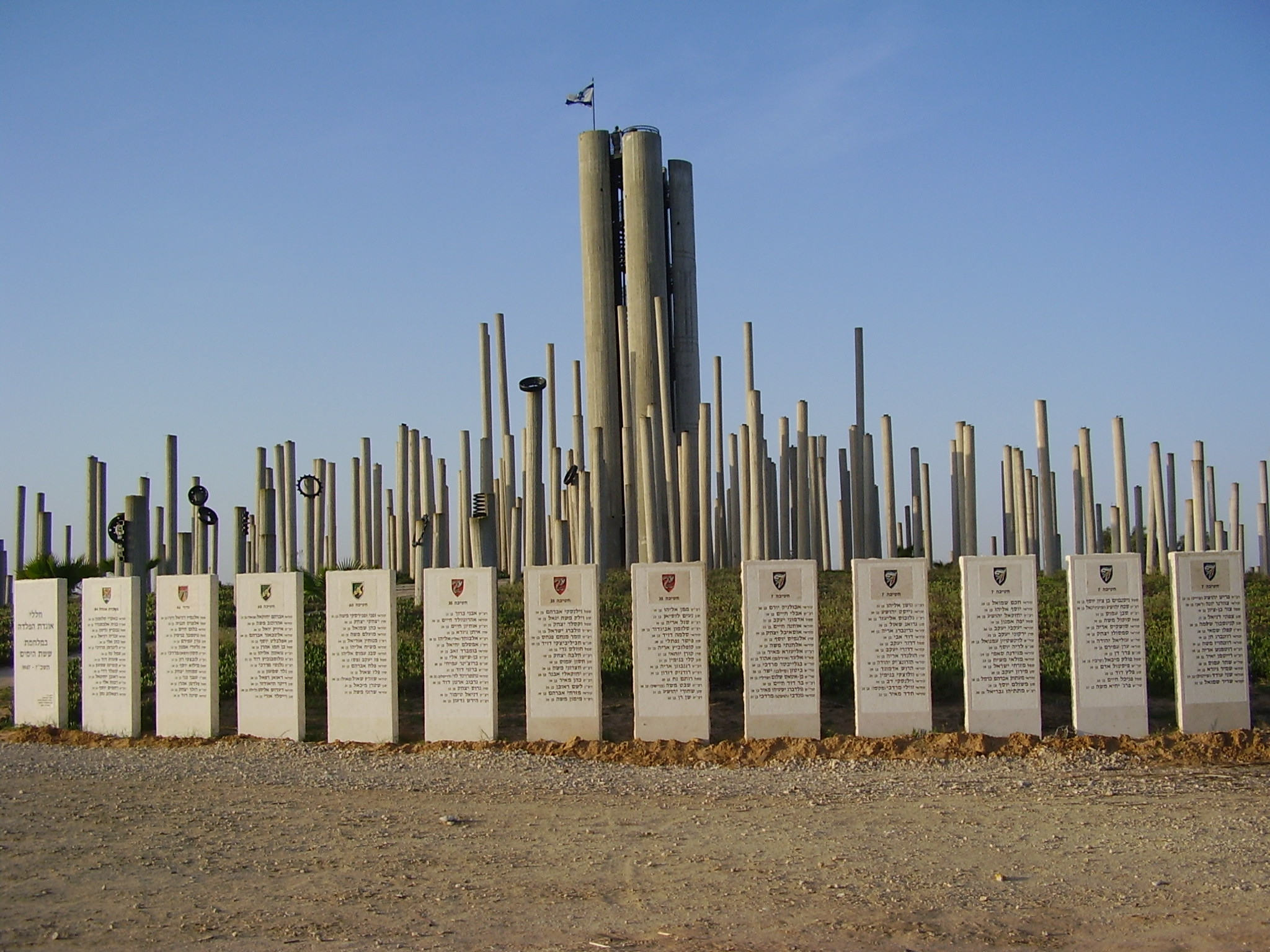
Six-Day War memorial

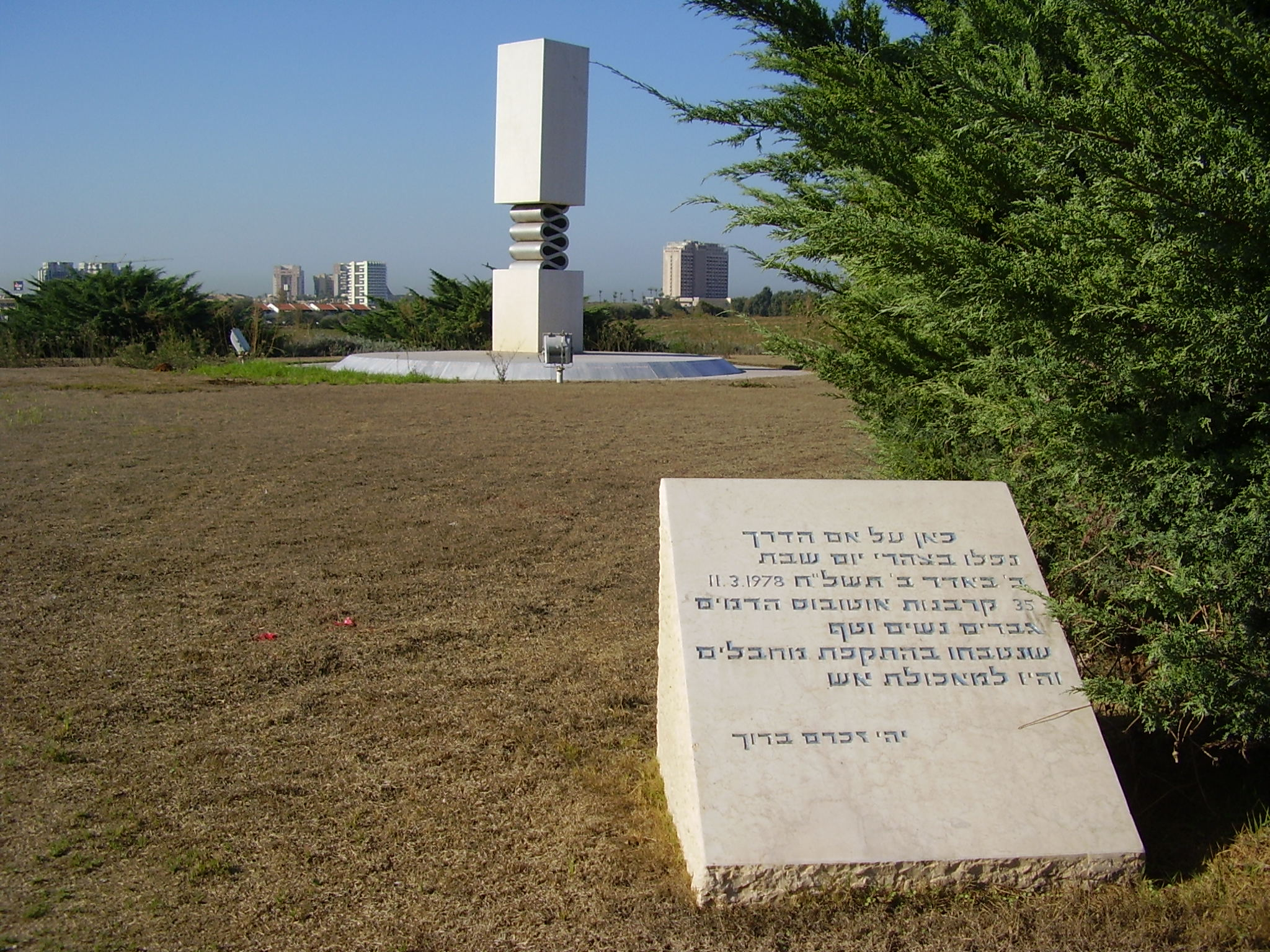
Coastal Road memorial

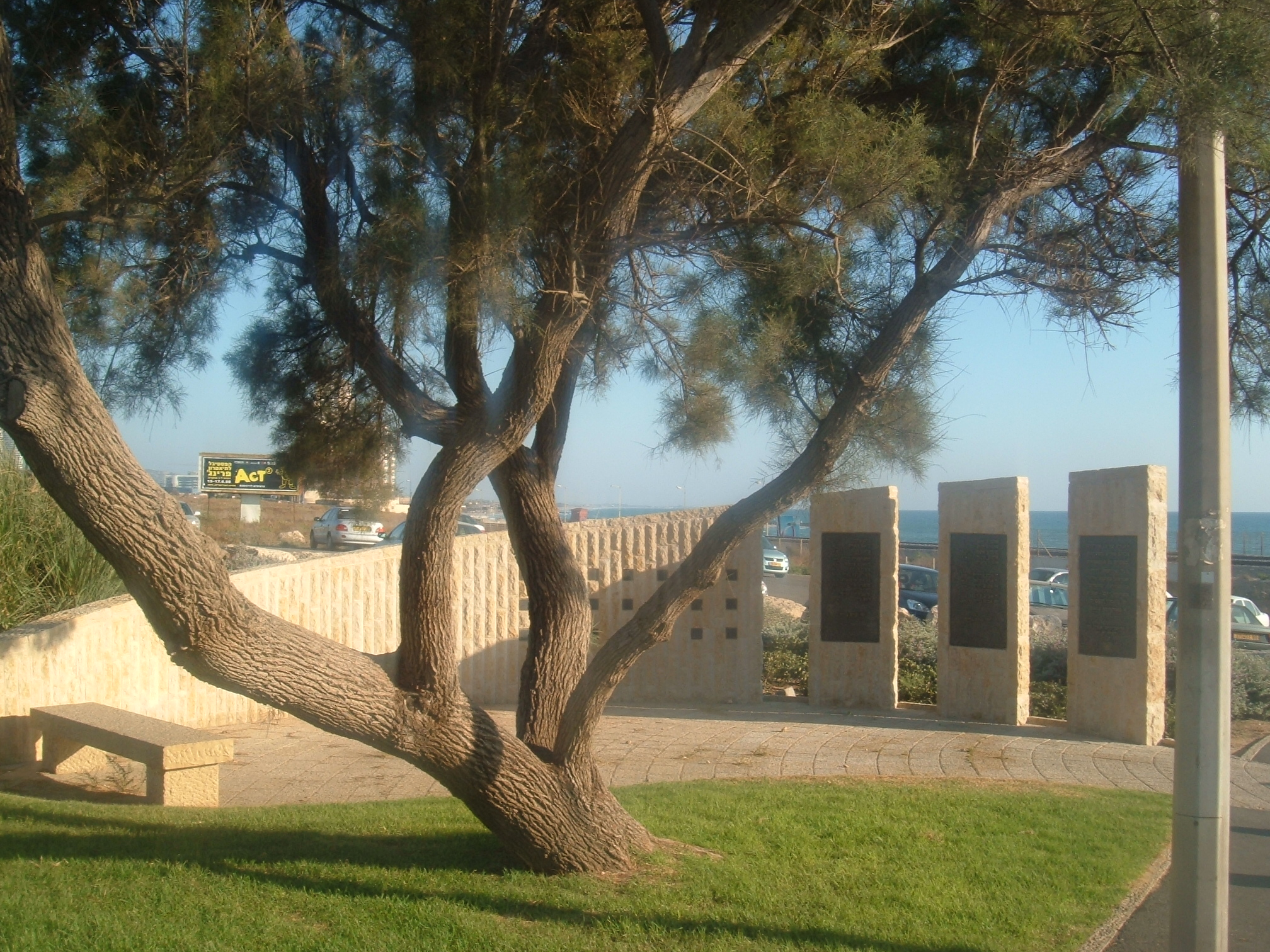
Maxim restaurant massacre memorial

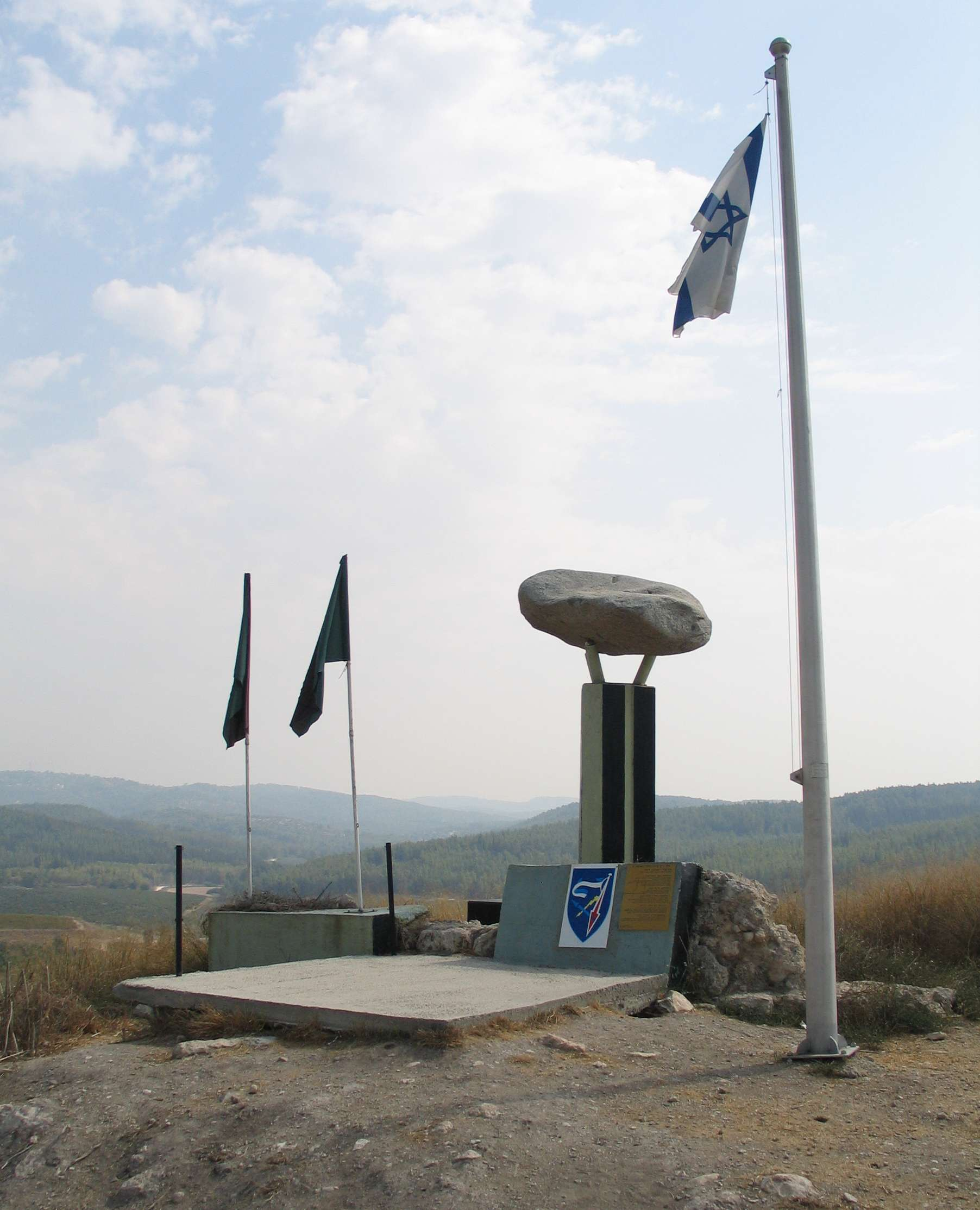
Latrun memorial

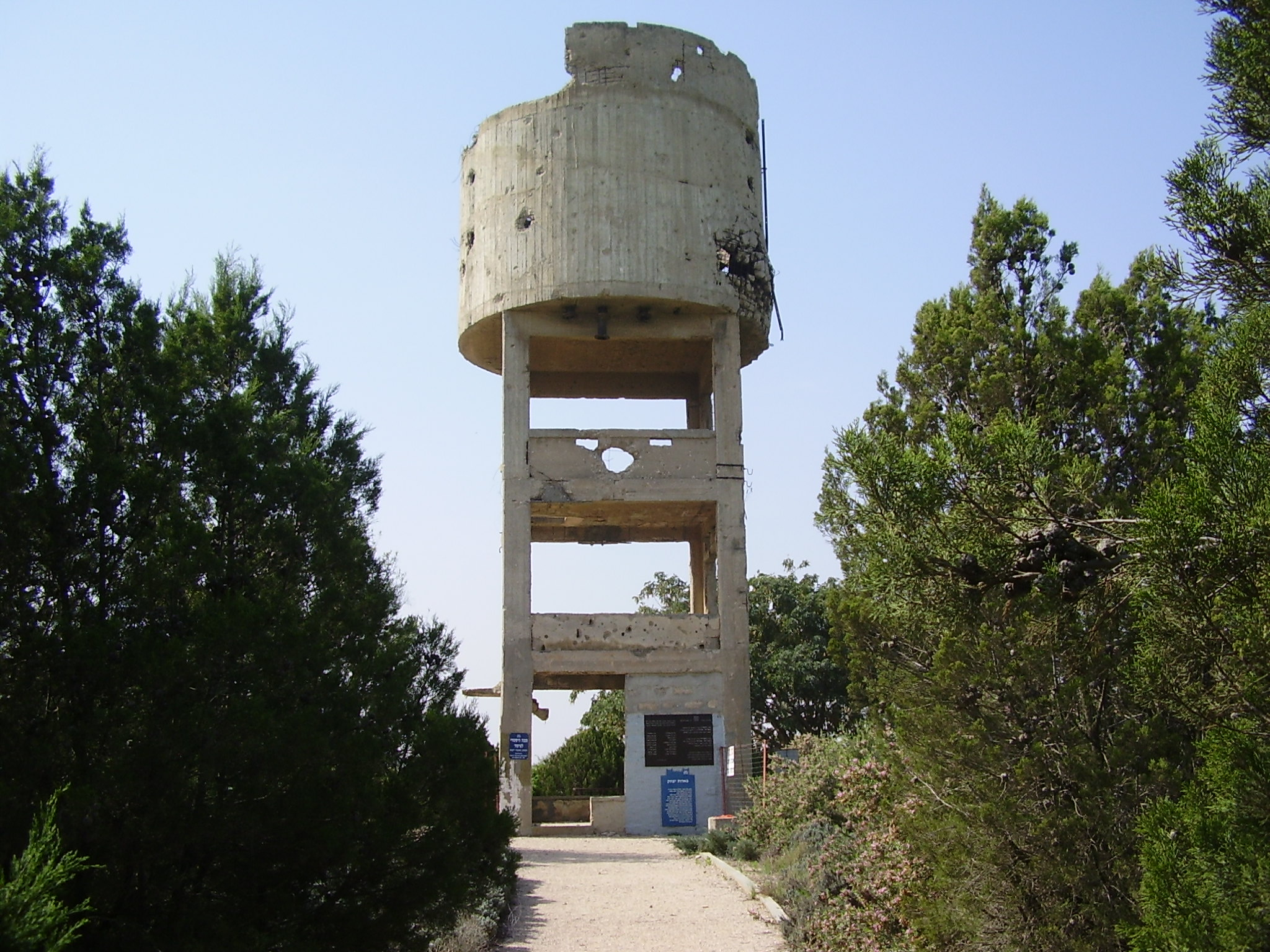
Be'erot Izhak memorial

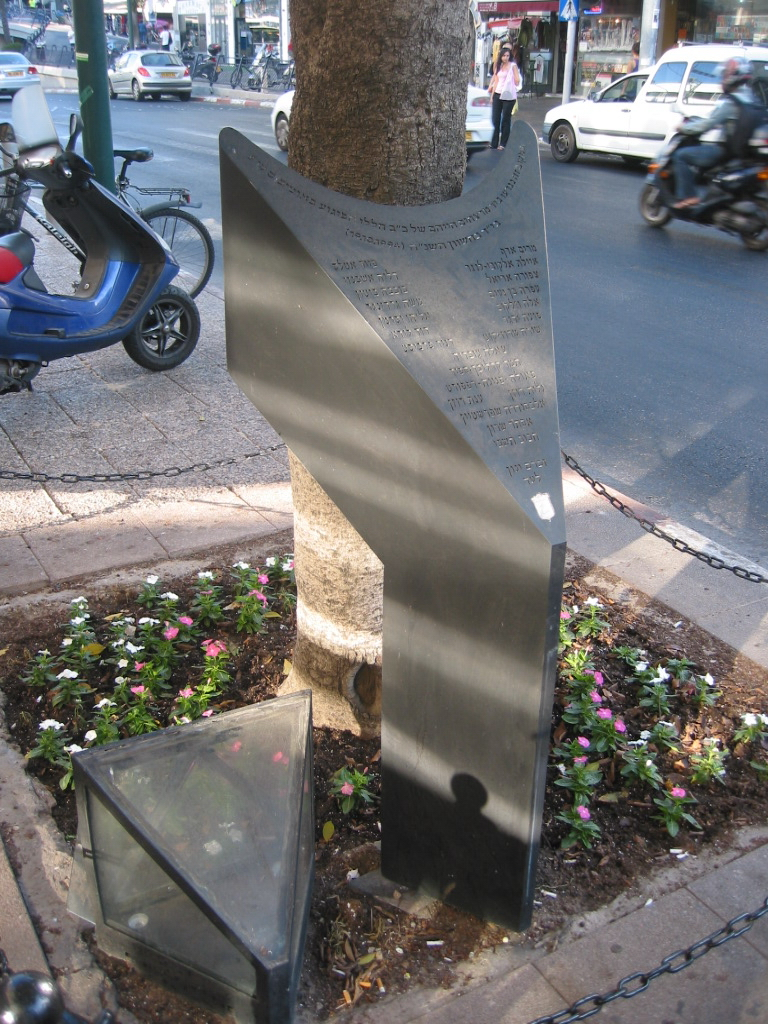
Bus suicide bombing memorial in Tel Aviv

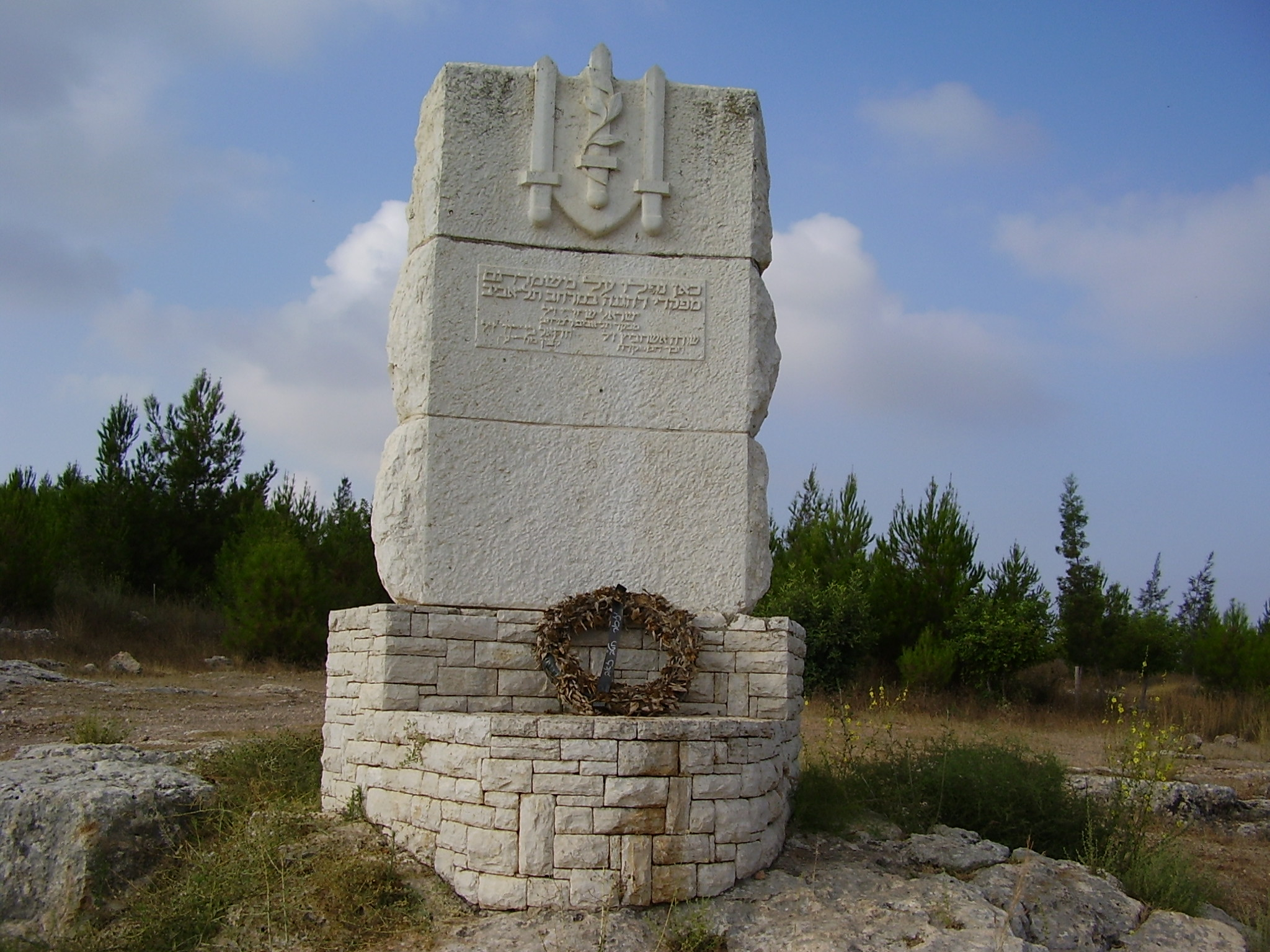
Haganah memorial

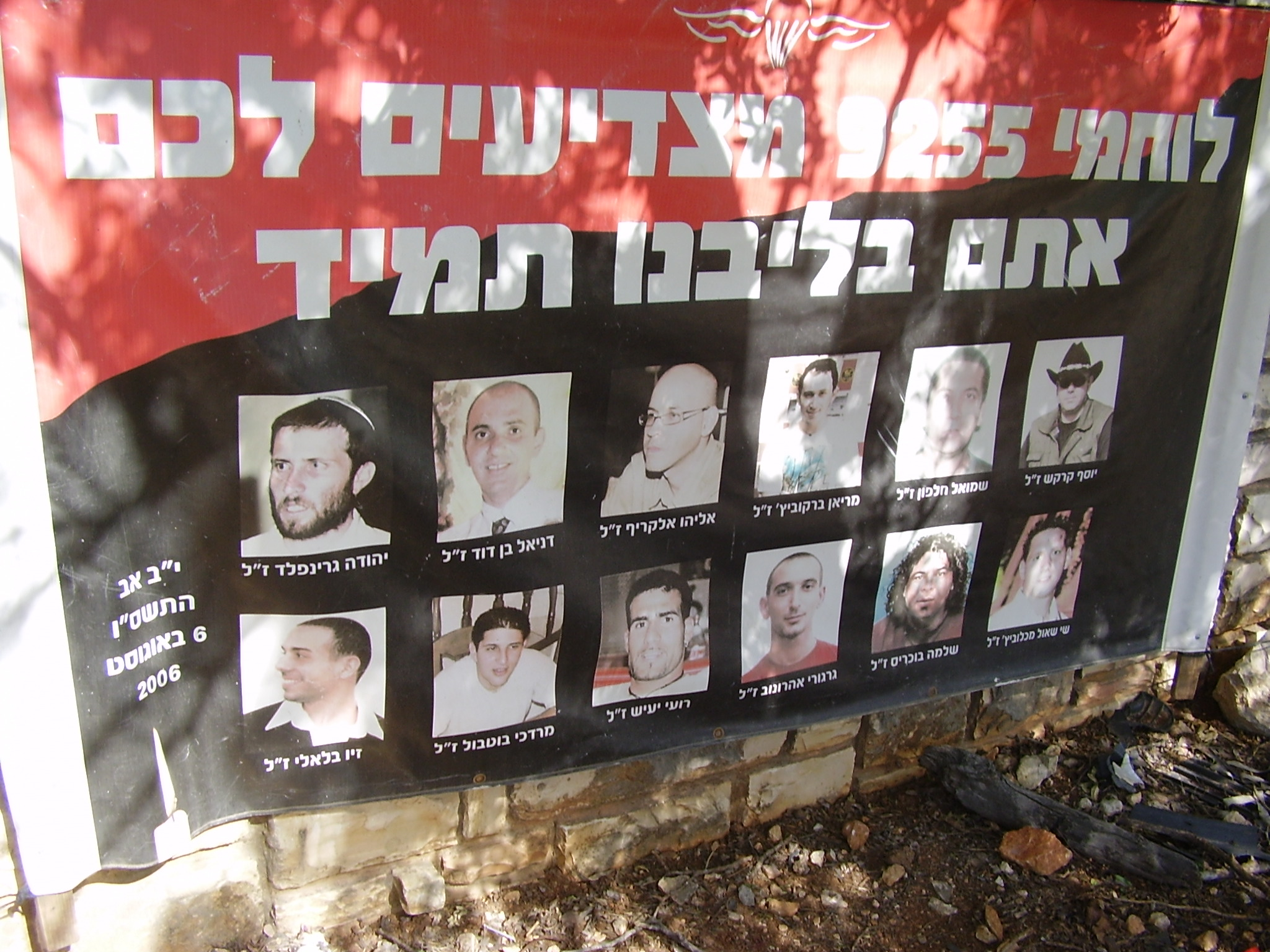
Second Lebanon War memorial

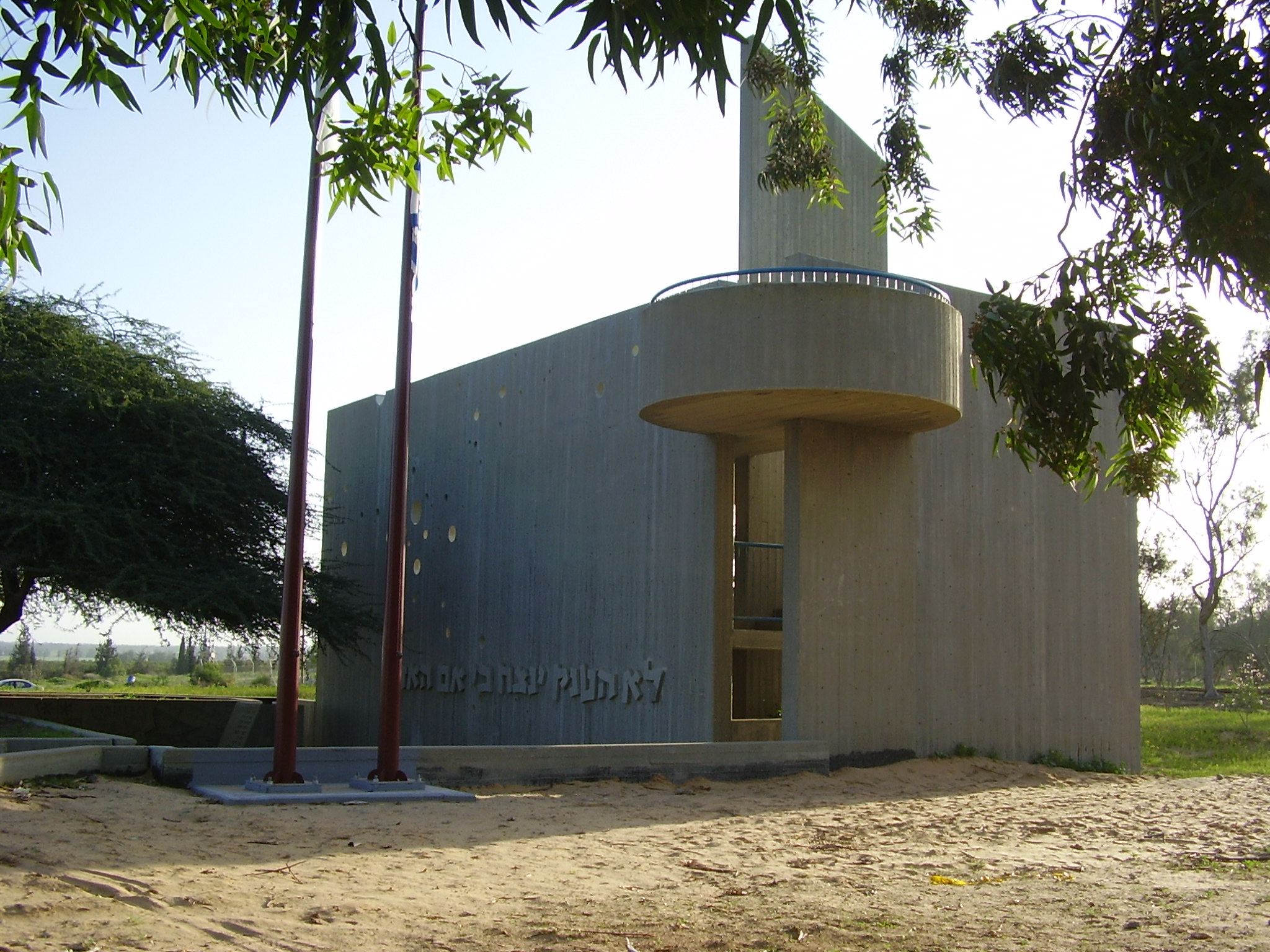
War of Independence memorial

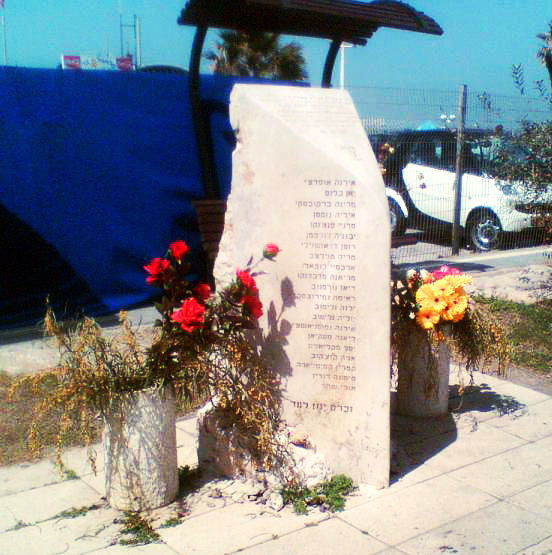
Dolphinarium massacre memorial

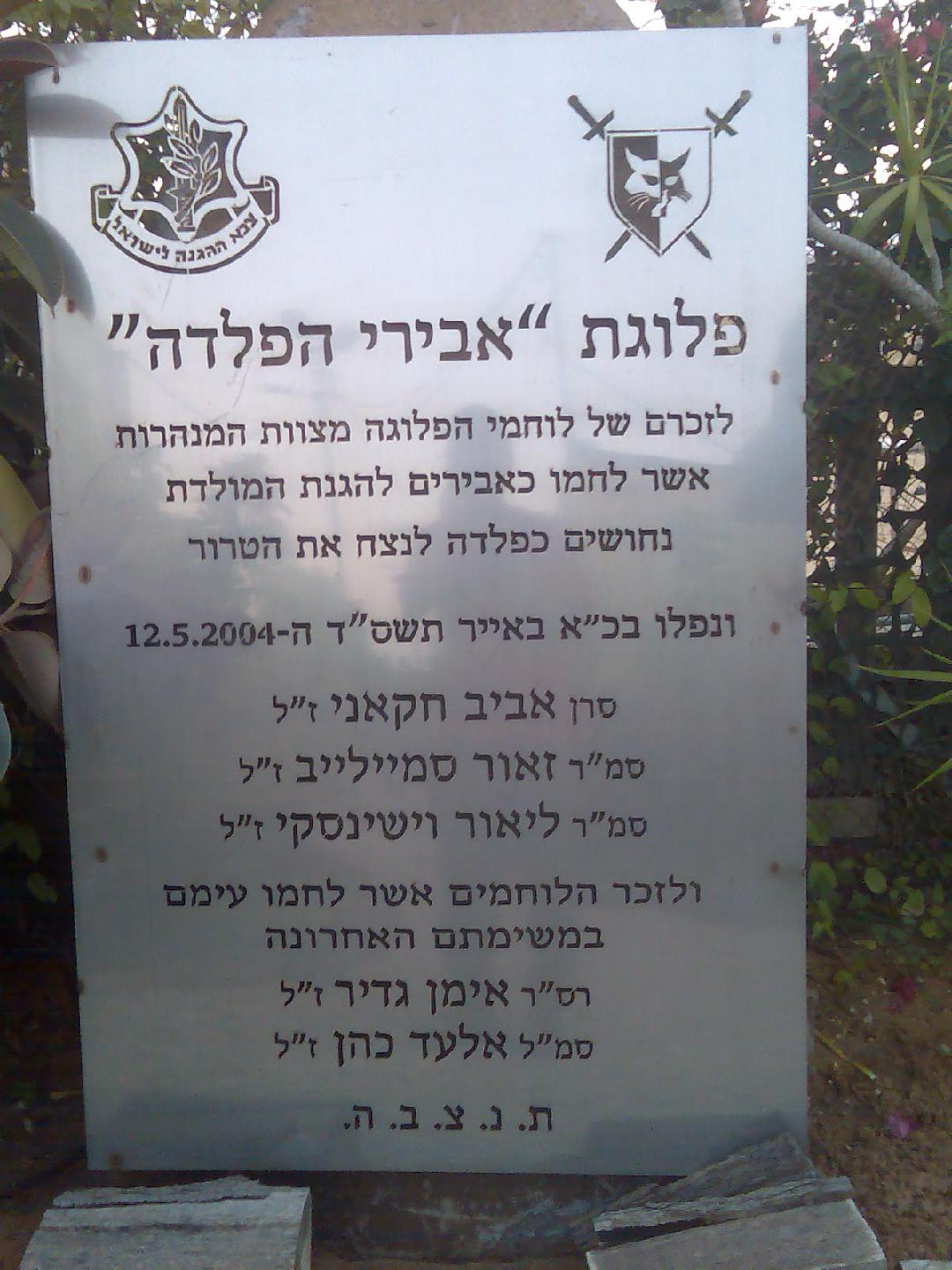
Combat Engineering Corps memorial

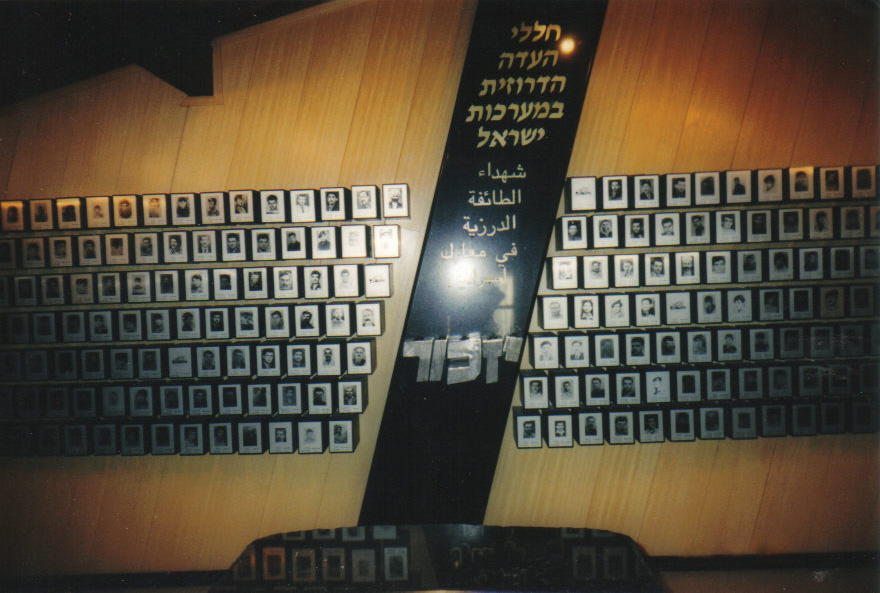
Druze soldiers memorial in Daliyat Al-Karmel

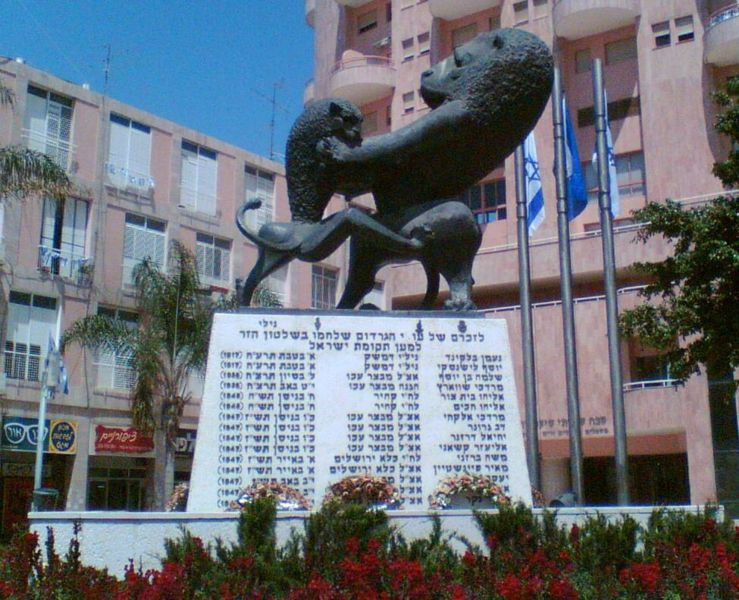
Olei Hagardom memorial

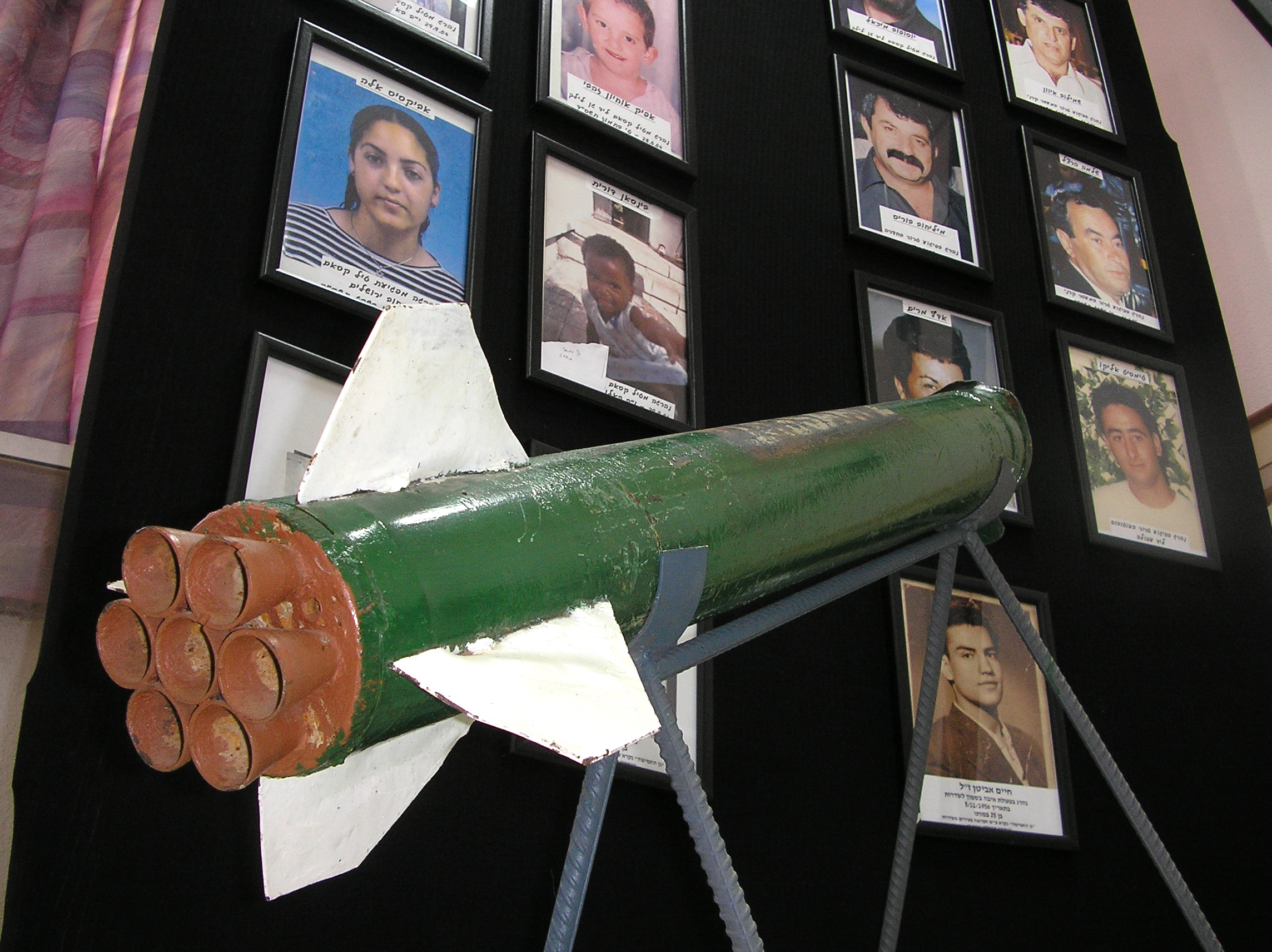
Fatality victims of Palestinian rocket attacks memorial

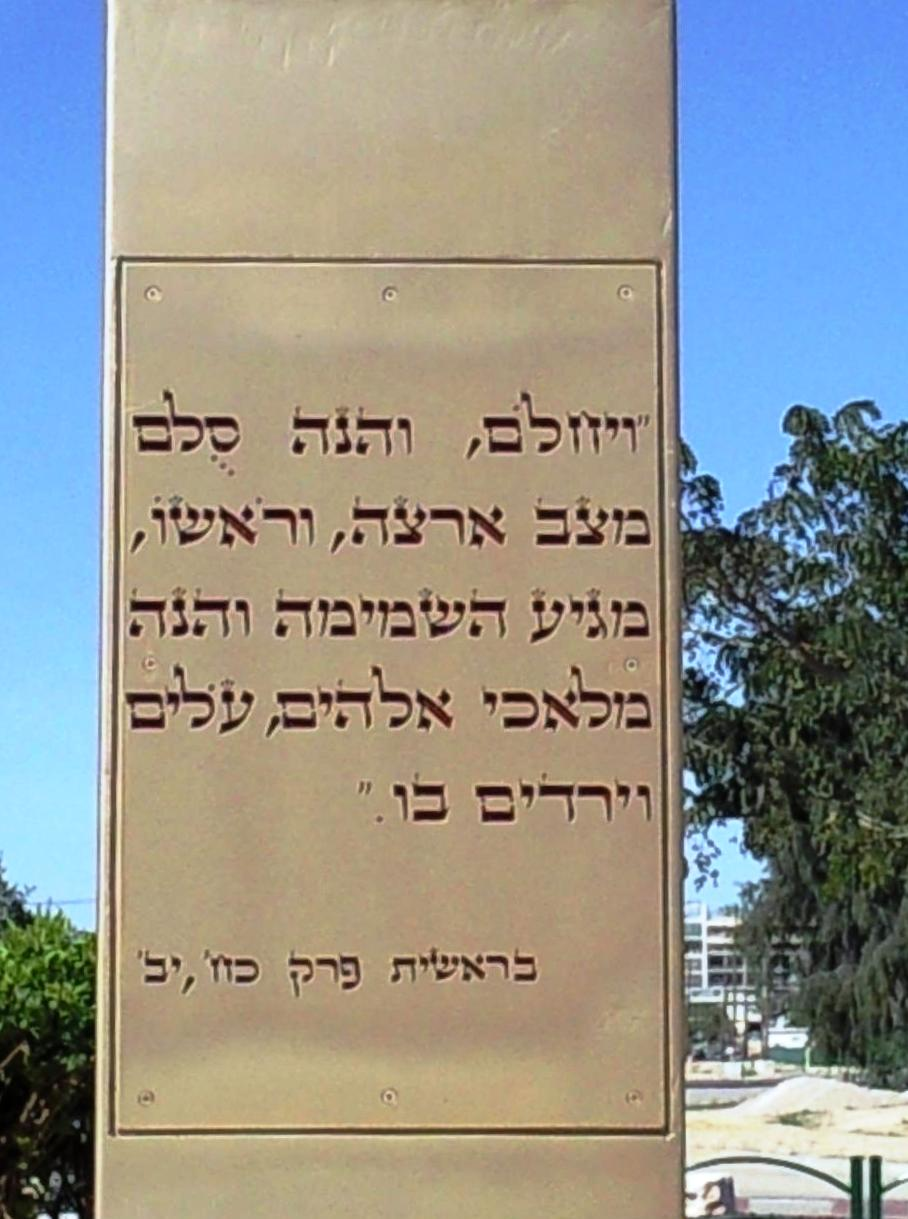
Beersheba suicide terror attack memorial

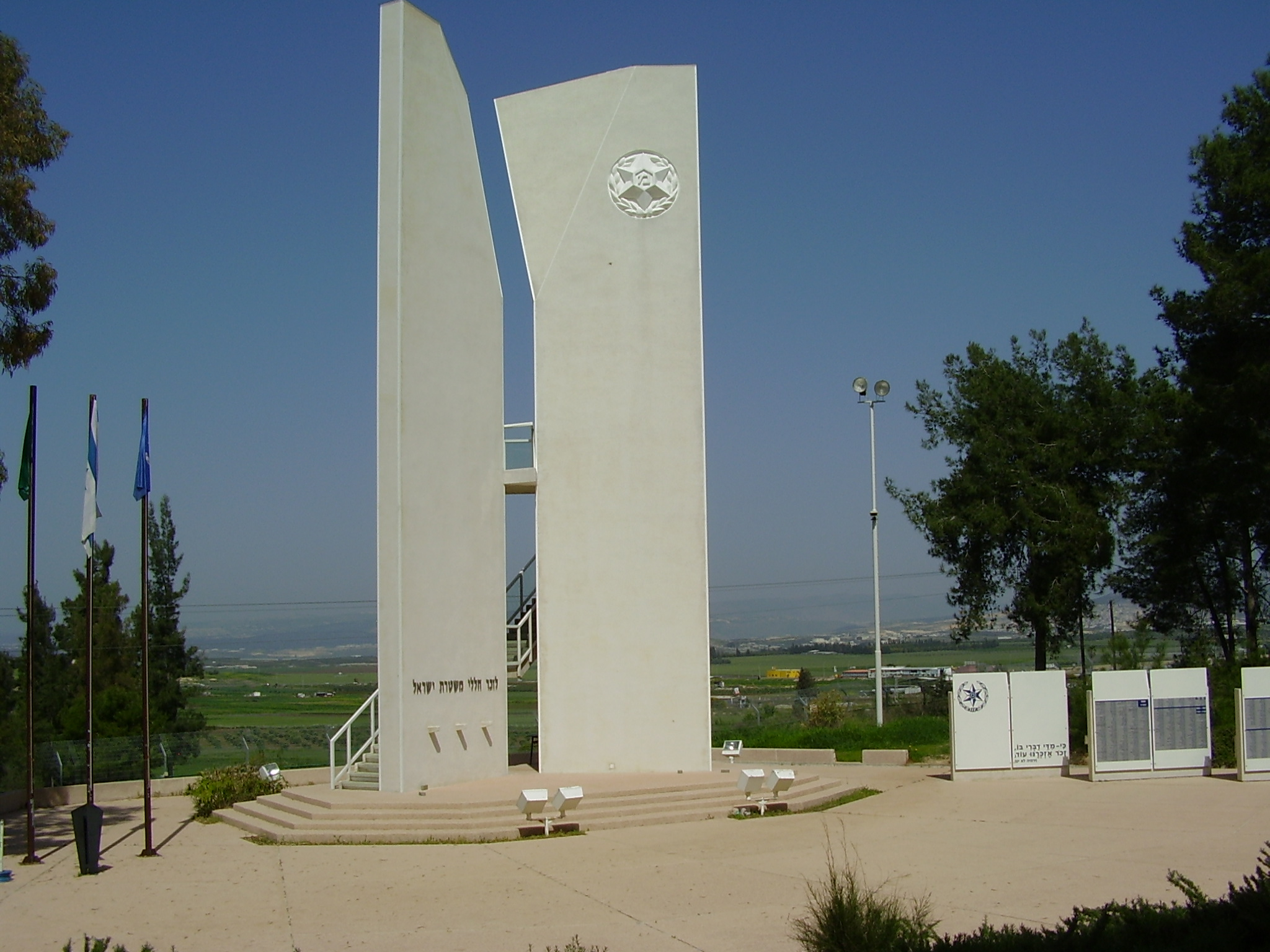
Fallen Israeli policemen memorial

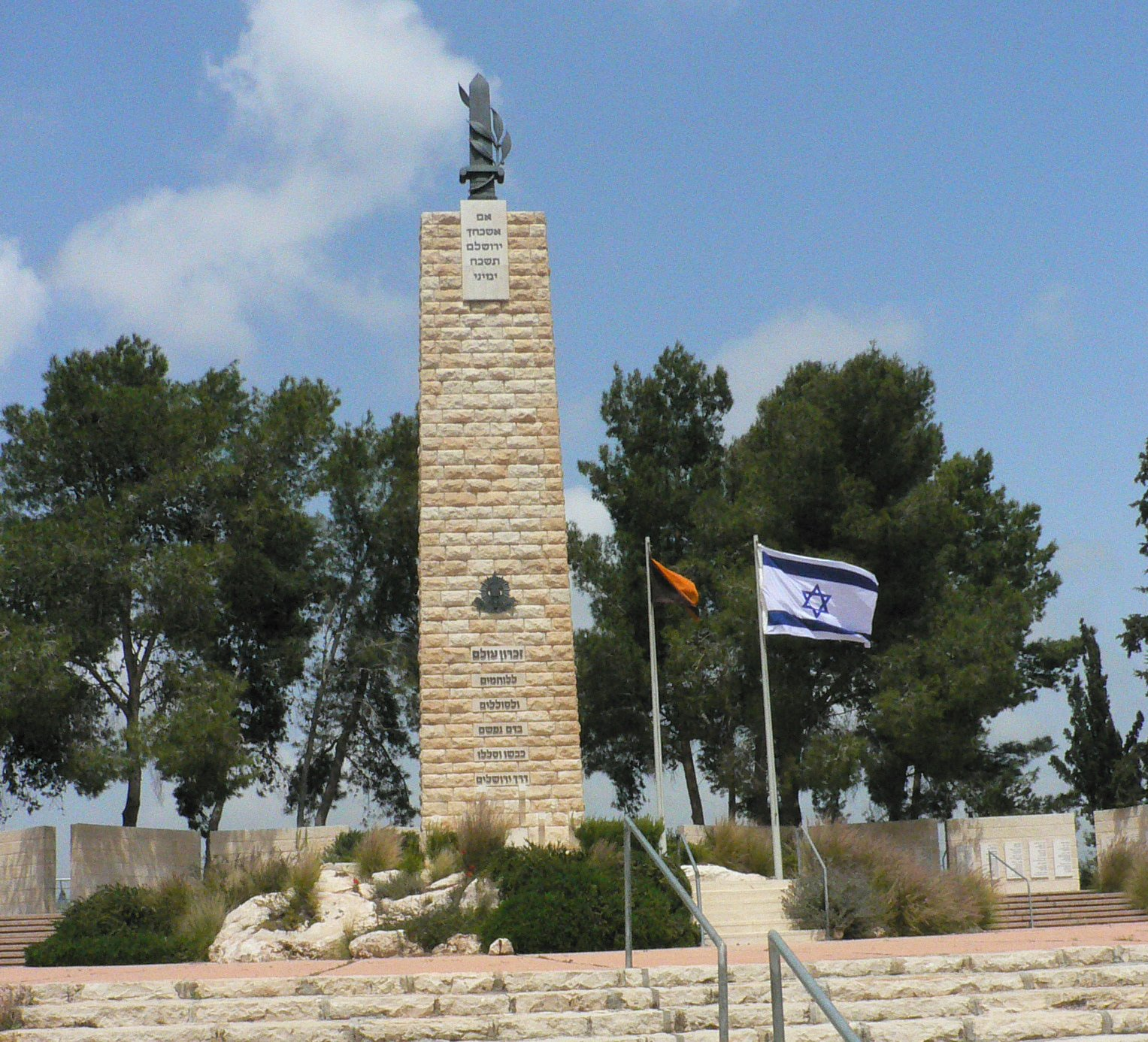
Memorial for the fallen soldiers of the Israeli Engineering Corp

== Gallery ==
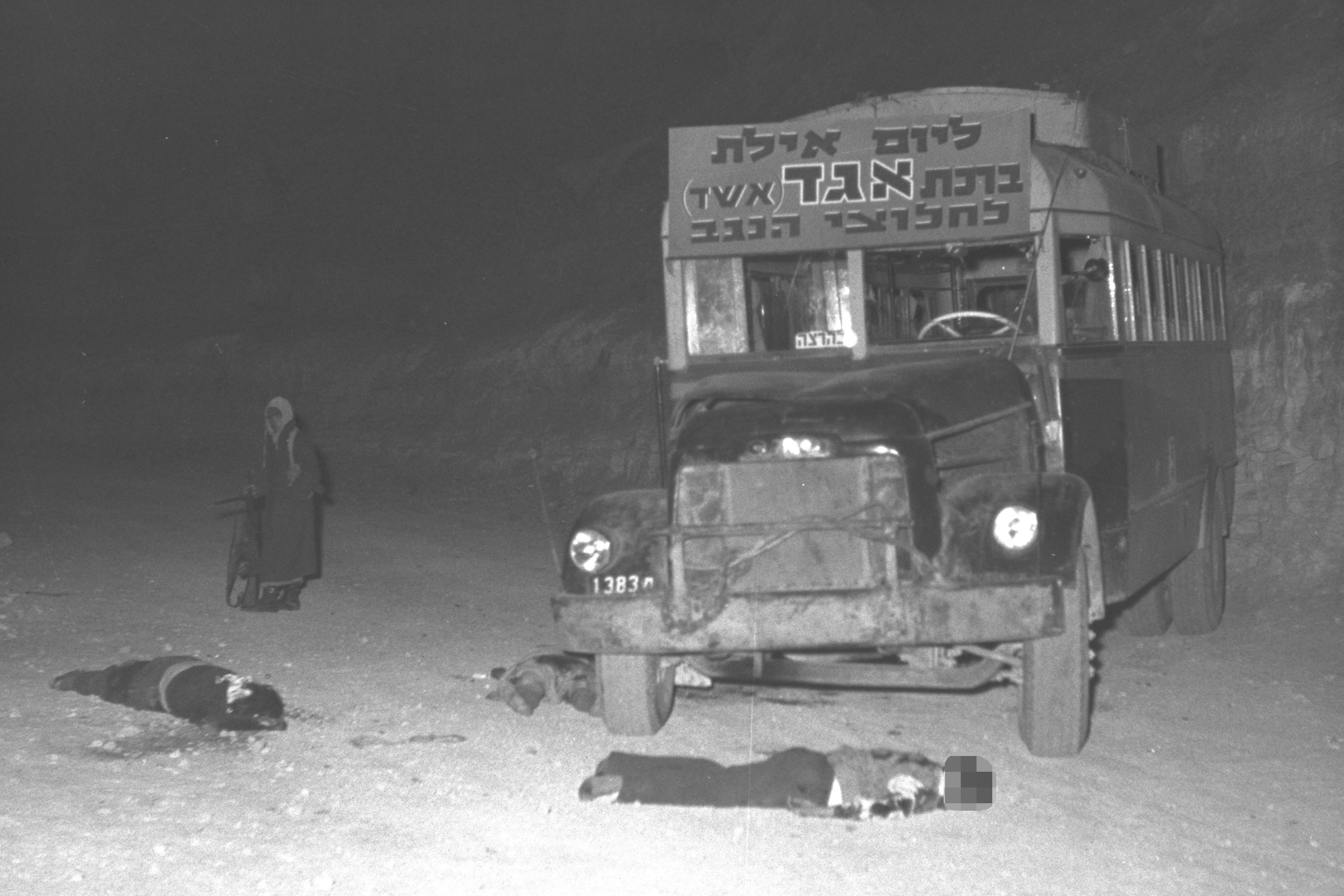
Ambushed Egged bus of the Ma'ale Akrabim massacre

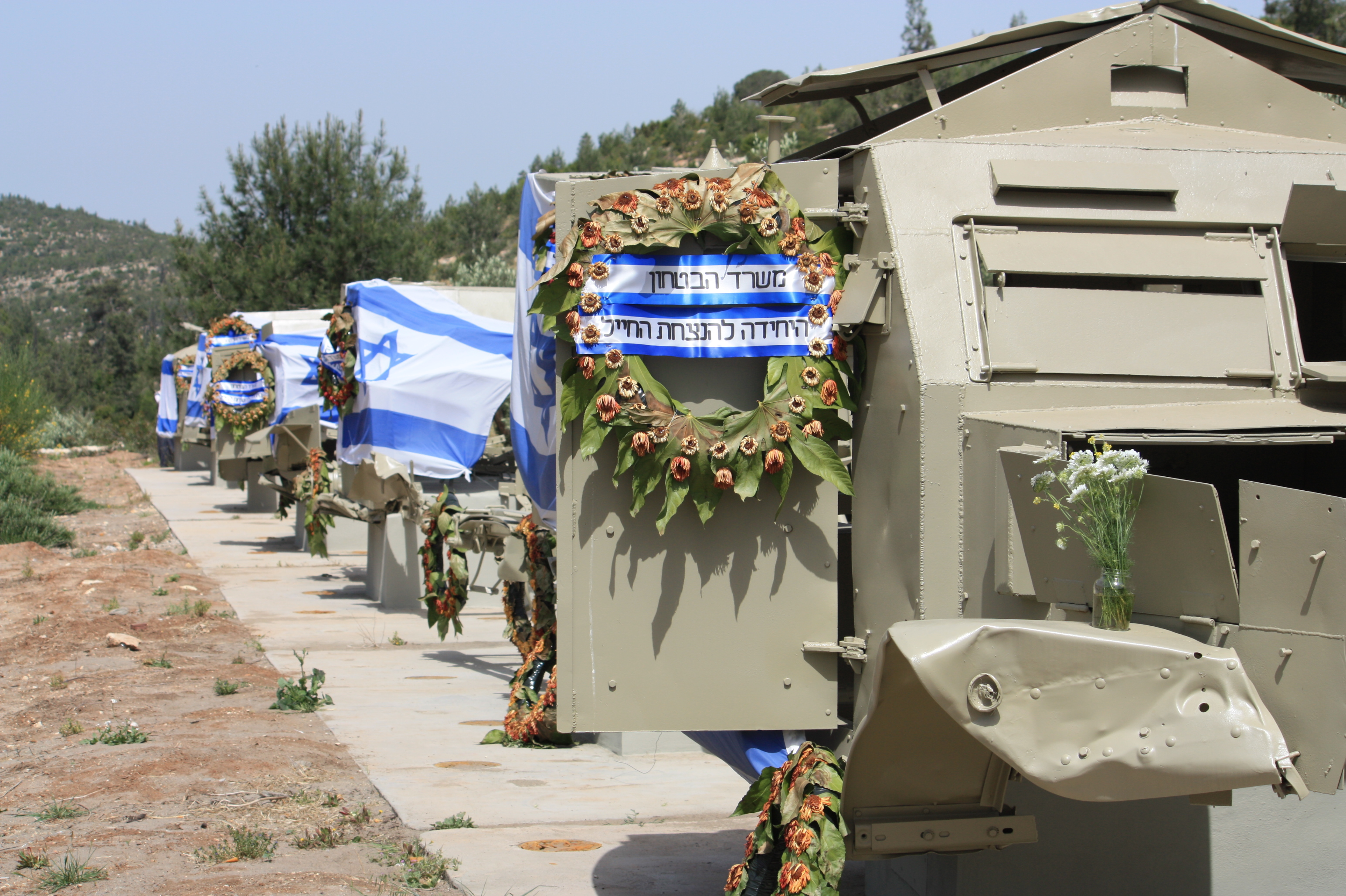
Remains of armored supply convoys used during the siege of Jerusalem

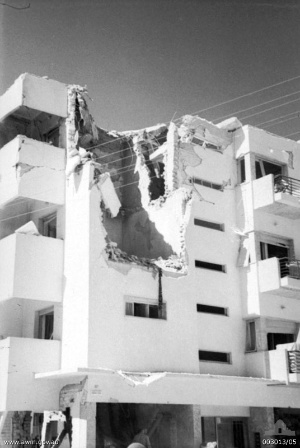
Aftermath of an aerial bombing on Tel Aviv during World War II

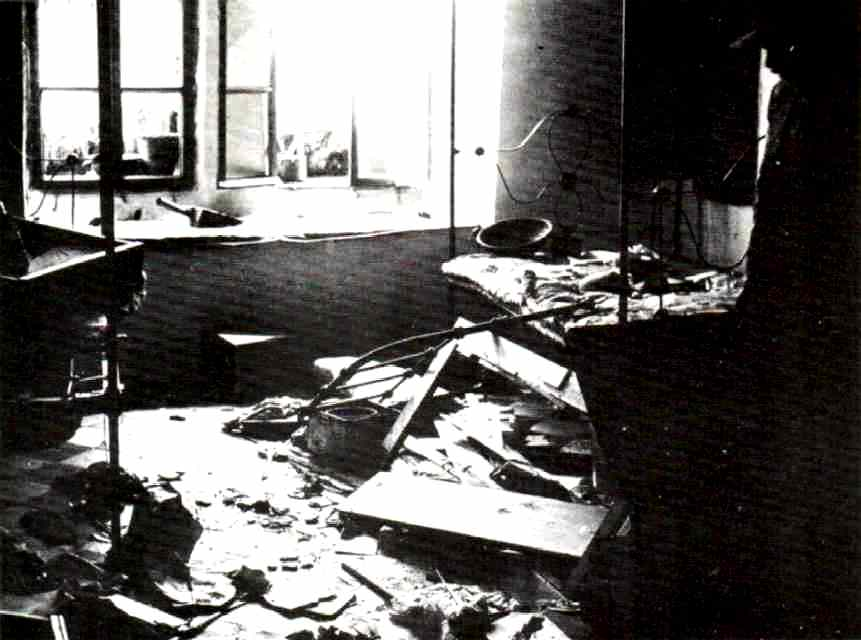
Scene of destruction in the Jewish Quarter after the Hebron massacre

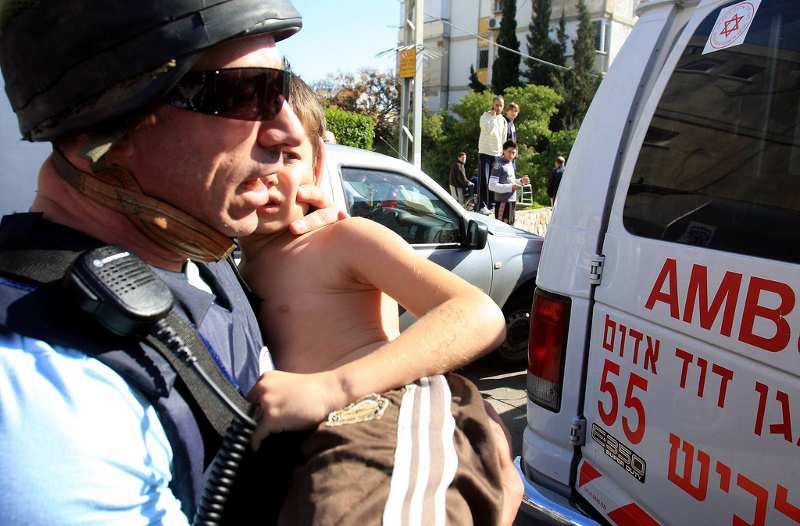
Qassam rocket attack on southern Israel

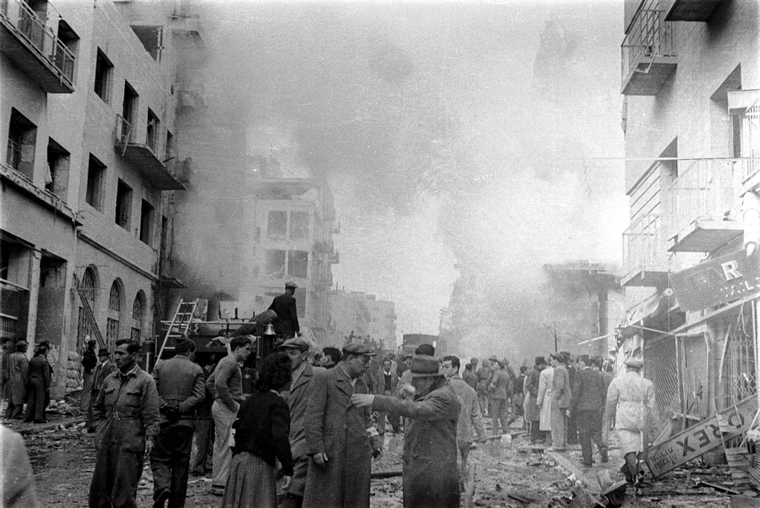
Aftermath of the Ben Yehuda Street bombing

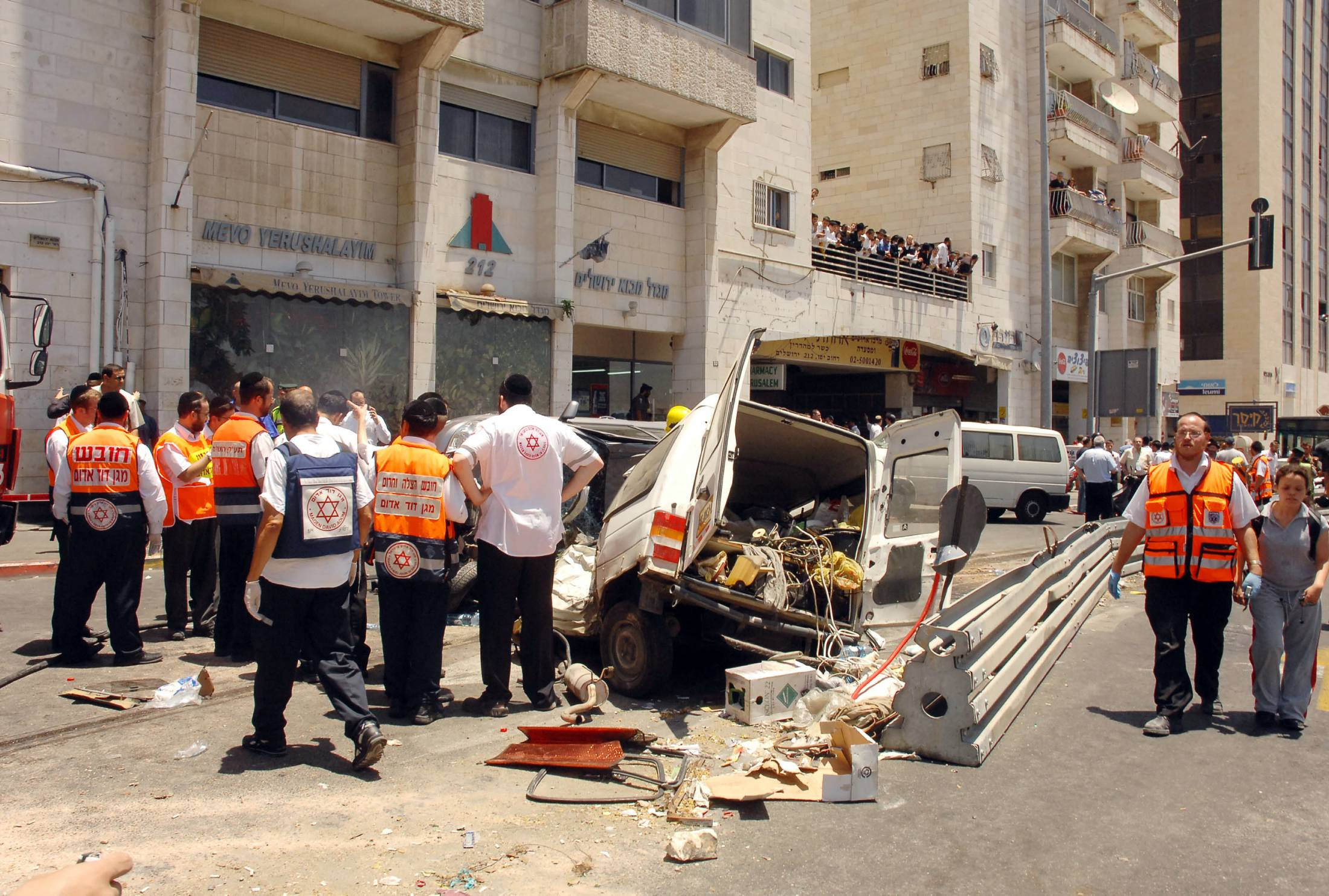
Aftermath of the Jerusalem bulldozer attack

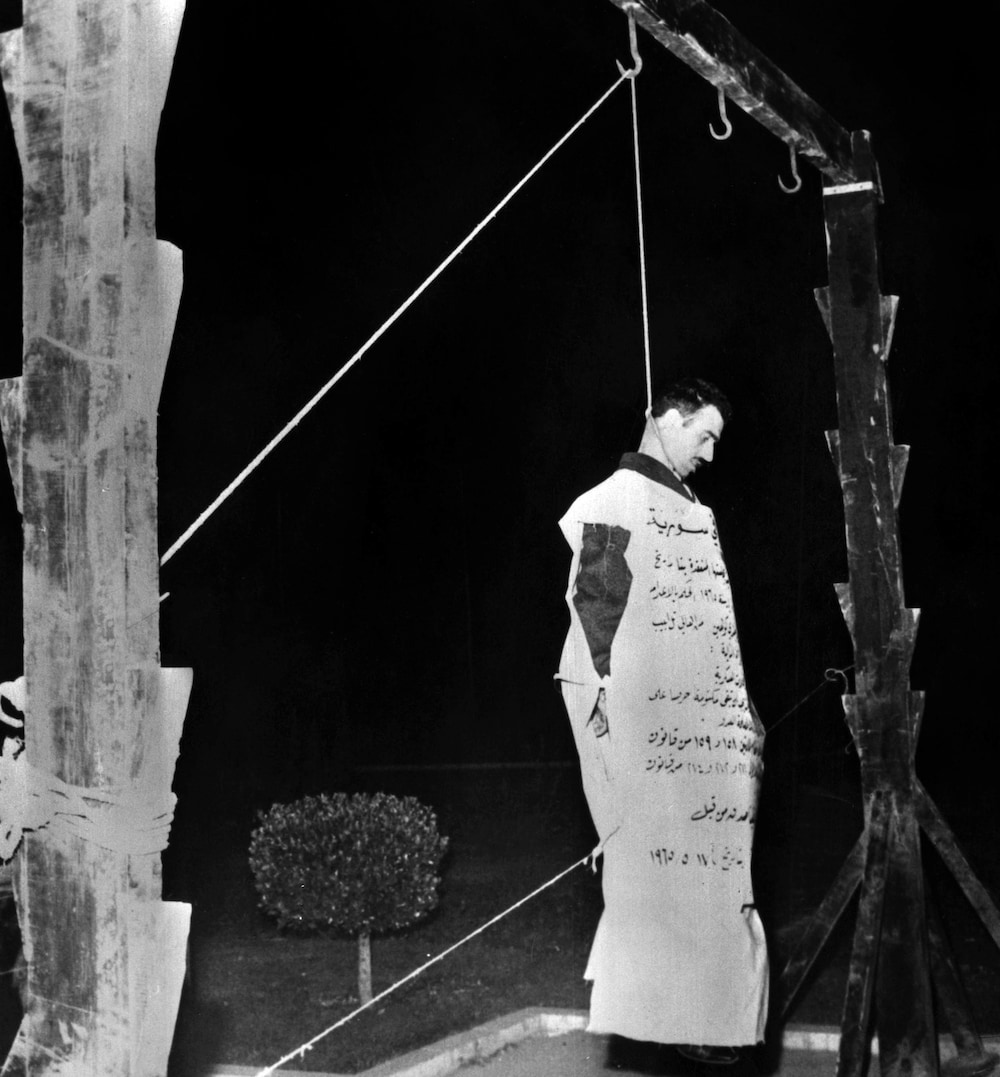
Eli Cohen, an intelligence agent hanged by Syria for espionage.

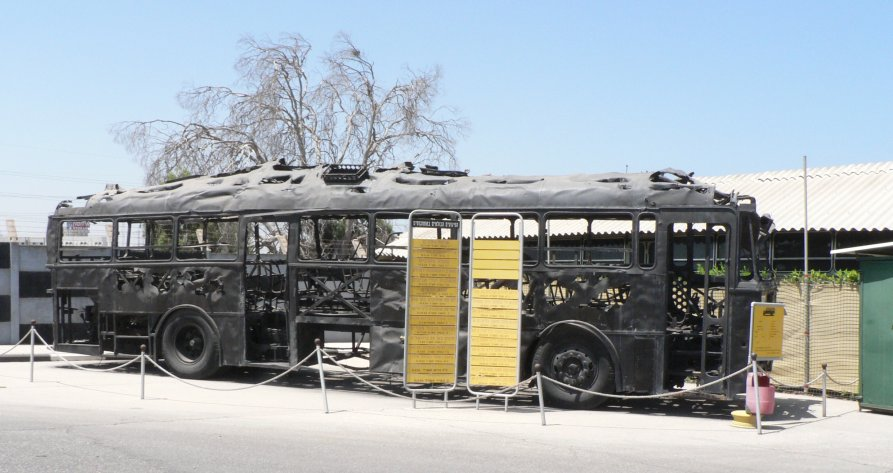
Charred remains of the hijacked Egged bus during the Coastal road massacre

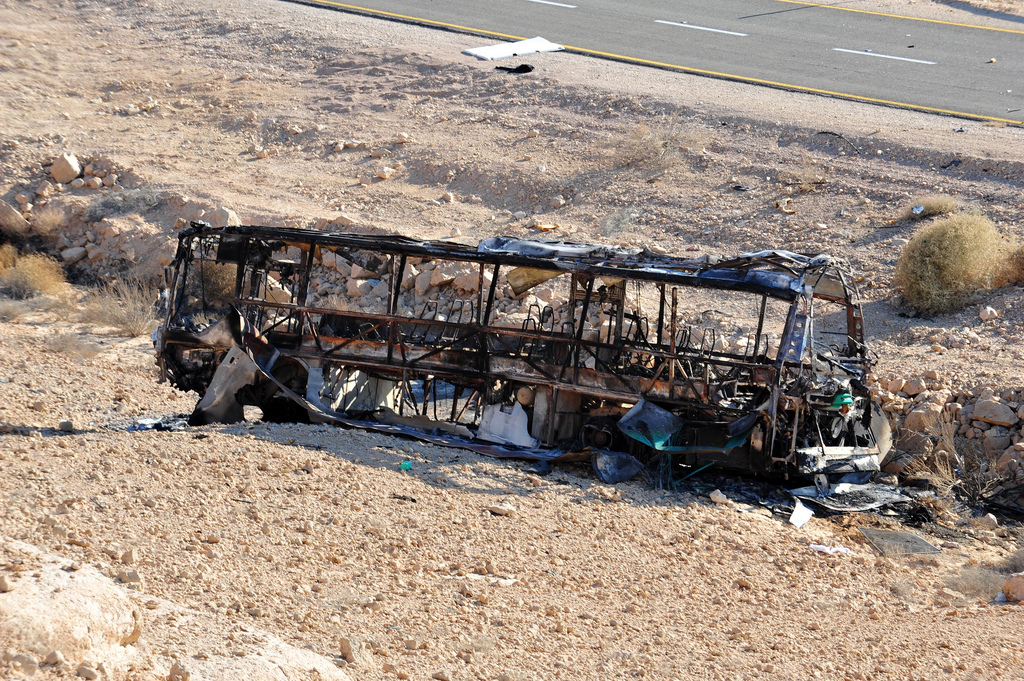
A destroyed bus after being attacked by a suicide bomber during the Southern Israel cross-border attacks.

== See also ==
- Timeline of the Israeli–Palestinian conflict
  - List of attacks against Israeli civilians before 1967
  - List of Israeli civilian casualties in the Second Intifada
  - Timeline of the Israeli–Palestinian conflict in 2001
  - Timeline of the Israeli–Palestinian conflict in 2002
  - Timeline of the Israeli–Palestinian conflict in 2003
  - Timeline of the Israeli–Palestinian conflict in 2004
  - Timeline of the Israeli–Palestinian conflict in 2005
  - Timeline of the Israeli–Palestinian conflict in 2006
  - Timeline of the Israeli–Palestinian conflict in 2007
  - Timeline of the Israeli–Palestinian conflict in 2008
  - Timeline of the Israeli–Palestinian conflict in 2011
- Yom HaZikaron
- Palestinian casualties of war
- Casualties of the Gaza war
