= 1970 Asunción Israeli Embassy attack =

1970 terrorist attack in Asunción, Paraguay

The 1970 Asunción Israeli Embassy shooting was a terrorist attack on May 4, 1970, that took place at the Israeli embassy building in Asunción, Paraguay. Two embassy secretaries were shot by two Palestinian men rumored to have belonged to Fatah.

== Background ==
In 1969, the Israeli government led by Golda Meir approved a plan intended to encourage, or force, the emigration of up to 60,000 Palestinians from the Gaza Strip to Paraguay. The plan failed with only a small percentage of the planned number making the journey. Under the plan, some Palestinians in Gaza were enticed to move to Paraguay by "travel agencies" set up in Gaza to promote emigration to Paraguay with promises of work; those who moved to Paraguay would be given a one-time lump sum of $100, while the Paraguayan government would be paid $33 per Palestinian it accepted, and after five years of residency they were to become eligible for a path to citizenship. Some were incorrectgly advised that they were actually going to Brazil, and some were simply deported by the Israeli administration. However, upon arrival, having been left in the country with few resources and with no actual guarantee of employment, they became destitute. Many of those that went had been lured in with false promises of becoming landowners and receiving further financial support, leading to additional frustration.

== Attack ==
Speaking to Hadeel Assali, the attacker, Talal al-Dimassi, said that the Israeli ambassador to Paraguay, Benno Weiser [hebraicized as Benjamin Varon], fixed up a number of other deportees with Brazilian ID and promised them work. He then arranged for them to be sent to the Triple Frontier, in the apparent hope that they would vanish. On the morning of May 4, 1970, at approximately 10:30 a.m., two young Arab men approached the reception of the Israeli Embassy building in Asunción, Paraguay, asking to see the ambassador. Embassy secretaries Diana Zawluk and Edna Peer tended to the pair and informed them that the ambassador was not present at the time. The two men then left. An hour later, at around 11:30 a.m., they returned to the embassy where they were challenged by armed guards. The men wrestled the weapons from the guards and opened fire. The attackers maintain that they opened fire on the ambassador, who was sheltering behind Edna Peer, the consular secretary. Peer died later at a hospital and Zahluk was critically injured. The perpetrators fled before being apprehended by police shortly after.

== Arrests and consequences ==
In subsequent investigations by the National Police, it was revealed that both attackers were of Palestinian origin and were reported to be members of the Fatah organization - an organization that had begun its armed struggle against Israel in the 1960's. They were incorrectly identified by The New York Times as Miguel Adapo and Cando Kalek. In reality, the names were Talal al-Dimassi and Khaled Darwish Kassab.

For thirty years, Mossad told the victim's widower, Moshe Peer, who oversaw consular matters, not to discuss the incident. He ultimately came out in 2004. He claimed that thousands of Palestinians had been sent to Paraguay. Other Israeli operatives argued that the numbers were much lower. Either way, the shooting brought the operation to an abrupt halt.
