= Quito Israeli Embassy bombing =

1982 terror attacks on Israeli Embassy in Ecuador

- Part of the South Lebanon conflict (1985–2000)
- Location: Israeli embassy in Quito, Ecuador
- Date: 26 November 1982
- Weapon: time bomb
- Deaths: 3
- Injuries: 1

On 26 November 1982, the Israeli embassy in Quito, Ecuador was bombed by unknown perpetrators, killing three people.

== Attack ==
A youth with a suitcase was sighted entering the embassy by eyewitnesses early in the morning. Witnesses said that he began taking out sticks of dynamite and lighting them by the time he had reached the third floor, right below the embassy. Somebody rang the building's alarm device, alerting the Israelis into fleeing outside. The youth dropped his bomb and ran away.

Police officers Manuel Jimenez and Vincente Jimenez were sent into the building for bomb disposal. The officers removed the bomb from its location and were 4.6 metres (15 ft) from the entrance when the device exploded. Vincente Jimenez, who was carrying the bag in his hands, was killed almost immediately. Manuel was approaching his partner when the blast happened, seriously injuring him. A nearby woman was tossed against the wall, but suffered minor injuries. The explosion caused a woman in a neighbouring apartment to fall out her window from the second-floor, killing her.

Manuel Jiminez was taken to his hospital for his injuries, where he had both his legs amputated. He died of his injuries soon after.

== Aftermath ==
The only group to claim responsibility was the left-wing ¡Alfaro Vive, Carajo!, but authorities discounted their claim due to the bomb's structure, instead concluding that it was likely the act of a Middle Eastern group. It is generally agreed it was done in relation to the 1985–2000 South Lebanon conflict.

The embassy was attacked again a few months later, but without any casualties or the level of damage the previous bombing had caused.

== See also ==
- Terrorism in Ecuador
- 1992 attack on Israeli embassy in Buenos Aires
