= List of attacks against Israeli diplomatic missions and personnel =

This is a list of attacks on Israeli embassies and diplomats since the establishment of the State of Israel in 1948.

Attacks on Israeli diplomatic facilities started in the 1960s, primarily letter bombs, hostage crises, and high-profile assassinations conducted by Palestinian armed organizations such as Black September and the Popular Front for the Liberation of Palestine (PFLP) and associated groups. From the late 1960s onward, Israeli embassies emerged as focal points of international political conflict, facing bouts of violence that resulted in casualties among diplomatic personnel, their relatives, and bystanders. The 1980s brought increased attacks on Israeli embassies as Palestinian armed groups expanded globally. After the October 7 attacks, Israel withdrew diplomatic personnel from some embassies in the Middle East due to security risks. According to Israeli Foreign Minister Gideon Sa'ar, Israeli embassies and diplomats were targeted about 30 times since the attacks.

Israeli diplomatic staff typically receive training to prepare them for security risks before going to an overseas posting. In some cases, Israeli representatives have been given special dispensation to carry a personal firearm.

== List ==
Date	Location	Details	Type of attack	Deaths
8 September 1969	The Hague, Netherlands; Bonn, West Germany; Brussels, Belgium	1969 Israeli embassies and El Al attacks: The embassies in The Hague and Bonn, and the Brussels office of Israel's national airline El Al were attacked with explosives within minutes of each other. Three El Al employees and a customer were wounded in the Brussels attack, while the other two bombings caused no injuries.	Bomb	none
4 May 1970	Asunción, Paraguay	1970 Asunción Israeli Embassy attack: Two armed Palestinians broke into the embassy and opened fire. A secretary, Edna Pe'er, was killed, and a local worker was injured. The perpetrators were apprehended and sentenced to long prison terms.	Shooting	1
17 May 1971	Ankara, Turkey	Assassination of Efraim Elrom: People's Liberation Army of Turkey (THKO) militants kidnapped Consul-general in Istanbul Efraim Elrom, demanding the Turkish government release imprisoned THKO militants. After the government refused, the militants killed Elrom.	Kidnapping and murder	1
11 September 1972	Brussels, Belgium	Embassy clerk Ophir Zadok was shot in the head and stomach. He had gone to a café after having received a telephone call from a Moroccan man reportedly identifying himself as Mohammed Ahmed Rabbat and offering to provide intel. At his trial, the perpetrator claimed to be a member of Fatah. The organization later claimed responsibility.	Assassination attempt	none
19 September 1972	London, United Kingdom	Agricultural attaché Ami Shchori was killed by the explosion of a letter bomb sent to him. The Black September Organization claimed responsibility.	Assassination	1
28 December 1972	Bangkok, Thailand	Israeli Bangkok Embassy hostage crisis: Four men forcibly entered the embassy, taking six personnel hostage, including the visiting ambassador to Cambodia, Shimon Avimor, and released them unharmed 19 hours later.	Hostage-taking	none
1 July 1973	Chevy Chase, Maryland, United States	Yosef Alon, air force attaché, was shot to death outside his home. The case was never solved, but the FBI reopened the case in 2017 after a reporter discovered possible new leads connecting the assassination to the Popular Front for the Liberation of Palestine (PFLP).	Assassination	1
28 April 1975	Johannesburg, South Africa	David Protter, a South African Jew serving as assistant security officer at the consulate with “some political ax to grind” held 21 persons hostage inside the facility, including three children, but later released five wounded persons and the children. Subsequent shootouts left two persons dead and more than 33 wounded, mostly bystanders. After 16 hours, he was subdued by South African security forces who stormed the building.	Hostage-taking	2
1 August 1978	Brussels, Belgium	Two bazookas directed at the embassy were discovered and safely dismantled. The PLO was accused of the attempted attack.	attempted rocket attack	none
5 April 1979	Nicosia, Cyprus	A bomb exploded in the embassy. No one was injured. The Syrian-backed Palestinian group As-Sa'iqa claimed responsibility.	bombing	none
14 May 1979	Istanbul, Turkey	A plot to abduct Israeli and U.S. consuls was uncovered. Two men belonging to a PLO-allied Turkish group were shot and killed.	Attempted kidnapping	2 (perpetrators)
13 November 1979	Lisbon, Portugal	Ambassador Ephraim Eldar was wounded in an assassination attempt that also killed an embassy guard and wounded the ambassador's chauffeur and a local policeman.	Assassination attempt	1
10 August 1981	Vienna, Austria; Athens, Greece	Two bombs were hurled into the embassy in Vienna early in the morning, injuring a 75-year old woman and damaging a house adjoining the embassy. Later the same day, two explosive devices detonated outside the diplomatic mission in Athens, causing slight damage to the building.	bombing	none
3 April 1982	Paris, France	A young woman shot and killed Ya'acov Bar-Simantov, attaché in the embassy, outside his home. The Revolutionary Armed Factions of Lebanon claimed responsibility for the attack. The perpetrator escaped.	Assassination	1
4 June 1982	London, United Kingdom	Ambassador Shlomo Argov was shot in the head when leaving a diplomatic affair at the Dorchester Hotel, suffering severe injuries that debilitated him until his death in 2003. The three perpetrators, who were members of the Abu Nidal Organization, were apprehended, tried and sentenced to 30-35 years imprisonment. The shooting was used as Israel’s justification for its decision to invade Lebanon two days later to rout Palestinian guerrilla bases.	Assassination	1
23 September 1982	Valletta, Malta	Esther Milo, the Charge d'Affaires was almost kidnapped by four men as she was about to enter her car. The attempt failed and Milo was only lightly injured. The attack was attributed to Abu Nidal.	attempted kidnapping	none
2 December 1982	Quito, Ecuador	Quito Israeli Embassy bombing: A bomb concealed in a suitcase exploded in the building housing the embassy. Two local policemen were killed and a local woman was injured. The building suffered considerable damage. A local organization claimed responsibility.	bombing	2
23 December 1982	Sydney, Australia	Sydney Israeli Consulate and Hakoah Club bombings: A bomb exploded in the consulate building. Two people were wounded, including a local employee. The Abu Ibrahim faction claimed responsibility.	bombing	none
5 June 1984	Cairo, Egypt	Zvi Kedar, embassy attaché, was wounded in the hand when he was shot from a passing car as he was about to enter his home in Cairo. Groups calling themselves the Revolution of Egypt and The Great Islamic Jihad claimed responsibility.	shooting	none
28 June 1984	Colombo, Sri Lanka	A bomb was detonated near a hotel room occupied by a diplomat. The explosion caused damage to the room but no injuries.	bombing	none
4 October 1984	Nicosia, Cyprus	A car bomb exploded in the parking lot of the embassy. The building suffered severe damage. No one was injured. Responsibility was claimed by Abu Musa, the Syrian-backed faction of the PLO led by Said al-Muragha.	bombing	none
20 August 1985	Cairo, Egypt	Administrative attache Albert Atrakchi was killed when a gunman pulled up to his car and machine-gunned it. He was the first Israeli diplomat murdered in Cairo. Atrakchi's wife and the wife of another Israeli diplomat were wounded in the attack. Groups calling themselves the Revolution of Egypt and The Great Islamic Jihad claimed responsibility.	shooting	1
19 March 1986	Cairo, Egypt	Eti Telor, wife of an Embassy employee, was killed and three embassy employees were injured in an attack on their car, near the Israel pavilion at the Cairo Trade Fair.	assault	1
16 February 1988	Manila, Philippines	An explosive device was detonated outside the embassy. There were no injuries.	Bombing	none
12 May 1988	Nicosia, Cyprus	1988 Nicosia Israeli Embassy bombing: A car bomb exploded near the embassy, killing three policemen. The Abu Nidal Organization claimed responsibility.	Bombing	3
7 March 1992	Ankara, Turkey	Assassination of Ehud Sadan: Ehud Sadan, Embassy Chief of Security was killed by an explosive device attached to his car. Islamic Jihad, Hezbollah and the Islamic Revenge Organization claimed responsibility.	Assassination	1
17 March 1992	Buenos Aires, Argentina	1992 attack on Israeli embassy in Buenos Aires: A suicide bomb demolished the embassy. Approximately 300 people were wounded. Among the dead were four Israeli personnel, four local employees, and bystanders, including elderly residents of a nearby nursing home, and schoolchildren on a passing bus.	Bombing	30
11 March 1994	Bangkok, Thailand	A hijacked truck laden with explosives was intercepted on its way to carry out an attack against the embassy after hitting a motorcycle. The perpetrator fled the scene, leaving the body of the murdered driver in the vehicle.	Attempted bombing	1
26 July 1994	London, United Kingdom	1994 London Israeli embassy bombing: A bomb exploded outside the embassy, injuring several personnel. Two British-educated Palestinians, Samar Alami and Jawad Botmeh, were convicted of the attack and received 20-year prison sentences in 1996.	Bombing	none
22 September 1997	Amman, Jordan	Gunmen shot and wounded two Israeli embassy security personnel. The Jordanian Islamic Resistance claimed responsibility.	Shooting	none
1 October 1998	Brussels, Belgium	A grenade was found and safely dismantled outside the embassy.	attempted grenade attack	none
17 February 1999	Berlin, Germany	Israeli consulate attack in Berlin: Some 100 PKK supporters broke into the consulate general in protest over the Mossad's alleged role in the capture of PKK leader Abdullah Öcalan. Israeli security guards shot and killed three intruders in self-defense after they took a woman hostage and tried to seize weapons.	assault	3 (perpetrators)
30 July 2004	Tashkent, Uzbekistan	2004 Tashkent suicide bombings: The ambassador's personal bodyguard and four local policemen were killed in a dual suicide bombing outside the Israeli and American embassies.	Bombing	7
1 February 2008	Nouakchott, Mauritania	2008 attack on the Israeli embassy in Mauritania: Shots were fired at the embassy by members of Al-Qaeda in the Islamic Maghreb. Three local residents were wounded.	Shooting	none
9 September 2011	Cairo, Egypt	2011 attack on the Israeli Embassy in Egypt: Demonstrators protesting the deaths of Egyptian soldiers killed by the Israel Defense Forces in the course of counter-terrorist operations along their common border stormed the embassy. Only after US president Barack Obama's intervention did Egyptian security forces break through the crowds in order to rescue six Israeli security guards who were trapped inside.	assault	none
13 February 2012	New Delhi, India (Georgia (country)) Tbilisi, Georgia	2012 attacks on Israeli diplomats: In New Delhi, a diplomat’s wife was wounded when a bomb exploded in her car while she was on her way to work. In Georgia, an embassy worker noticed a bomb attached to the bottom of his car and alerted authorities who dismantled the device before it was detonated.	Bombing	none
14 February 2012	Bangkok, Thailand	2012 Bangkok bombings: Three separate blasts injured five people and blew the legs off one of the bombers, an Iranian national who was fleeing the scene of the attacks when a grenade he was holding slipped out of his hand and detonated beside him. Authorities believed that the intended targets were Israeli diplomatic facilities and personnel.	Bombing	none
23 July 2017	Amman, Jordan	2017 Amman incident: The deputy director of security of the embassy was attacked with a screwdriver. The official then shot and killed the attacker. A Jordanian landlord was also inadvertently shot and later pronounced dead. The attacker was a carpenter who came to install furniture at an apartment rented by the embassy either inside or near the embassy compound.	Screwdriver attack	2
13 October 2023	Beijing, China	An embassy employee was stabbed and injured by a foreign national.	Knife attack	none
31 January 2024	Stockholm, Sweden	A "live" and "dangerous object" was discovered outside the embassy by police and destroyed in a controlled detonation.	Attempted bombing	none
21 March 2024	The Hague, Netherlands	A 25-year old Syrian-born Amsterdam resident threw a Molotov cocktail at the Israeli embassy, resulting in a fire on part of the embassy's facade. He had previously traveled to The Hague three weeks prior with a bottle of petrol intending to target the embassy, but ultimately did not act. Arrested the same day, he was sentenced to 2.5 years in prison in July.	Arson attack	none
29 May 2024	Mexico City, Mexico	Protestors demonstrating against the Gaza war threw Molotov cocktails at the embassy.	Arson attack	none
3 June 2024	Bucharest, Romania	A man was arrested after throwing a Molotov cocktail at the embassy.	Arson attack	none
29 June 2024	Belgrade, Serbia	2024 attack on the Israeli embassy in Belgrade: A man injured a police officer guarding the Israeli embassy using a crossbow. The officer in turn shot dead the attacker.	Crossbow attack	1 (perpetrator)
5 September 2024	Munich, Germany	2024 Munich shooting: A man accused of involvement in a terrorist organization opened fire at the Israeli consulate and the Munich Documentation Centre for the History of National Socialism before being shot dead by police.	Shooting	1 (perpetrator)
1 October 2024	Stockholm, Sweden	Unidentified gunmen opened fire at the Israeli embassy. According to the Swedish Security Service, Iran may have been involved in both the 1 and 2 October attacks in Stockholm and Copenhagen.	Shooting	none
2 October 2024	Copenhagen, Denmark	Two hand grenades were detonated 100 meters away from the Israeli embassy, damaging a terrace of another building and resulting in the arrest of three Swedish nationals. According to the Swedish Security Service, Iran may have been involved in both the 1 and 2 October attacks in Stockholm and Copenhagen.	Grenade attack	none
28 April 2025	London, United Kingdom	34-year-old Kuwait-born migrant Abdullah Albadri was arrested as he attempted to scale the Israeli embassy's protective railings. Earlier that morning, he had messaged his mother, "I chose the path of martyrdom." In May 2026, he was convicted of preparing a terror-related knife attack and on 5 October the same year he was sentenced to life imprisonment with a minimum of 20 years behind bars.	Knife attack	none
21 May 2025	Washington, D.C., United States	2025 killing of Israeli embassy workers in Washington, D.C.: Two Israeli embassy staffers were shot dead outside the Capital Jewish Museum. A suspect was detained at the scene.	Shooting	2
6 March 2026	Manama, Bahrain	2026 Iran war: Iran carried out a drone attack on the Financial Harbour Towers commercial complex housing the embassy.	Drone strike	none
7 April 2026	Istanbul, Turkey	2026 attack on Israeli consulate in Istanbul: Three gunmen opened fire on police outside the building housing the Israeli consulate, resulting in a shootout that left one of the attackers dead and the other two injured. Two police officers were also injured.	Shooting	1 (perpetrator)
28 October 2026	Belgrade, Serbia	In the early morning, a minor attacked a police officer guarding the Israeli embassy with two knives outside the building while yelling "Allahu Akbar", injuring him lightly before being shot dead. Serbian authorities treated the incident as a suspected terrorist attack and said that the suspect was known and monitored by them prior to the attack as well as being a supporter of Islamic State, having a black flag on his Instagram account as support for the group. Serbia raised its terror alert to the highest level after the attack.	Knife attack	1 (perpetrator)
