= 2025 Capital Jewish Museum shooting =

2025 shooting in Washington, D.C., US

- Part of attacks against Israeli diplomatic missions and personnel
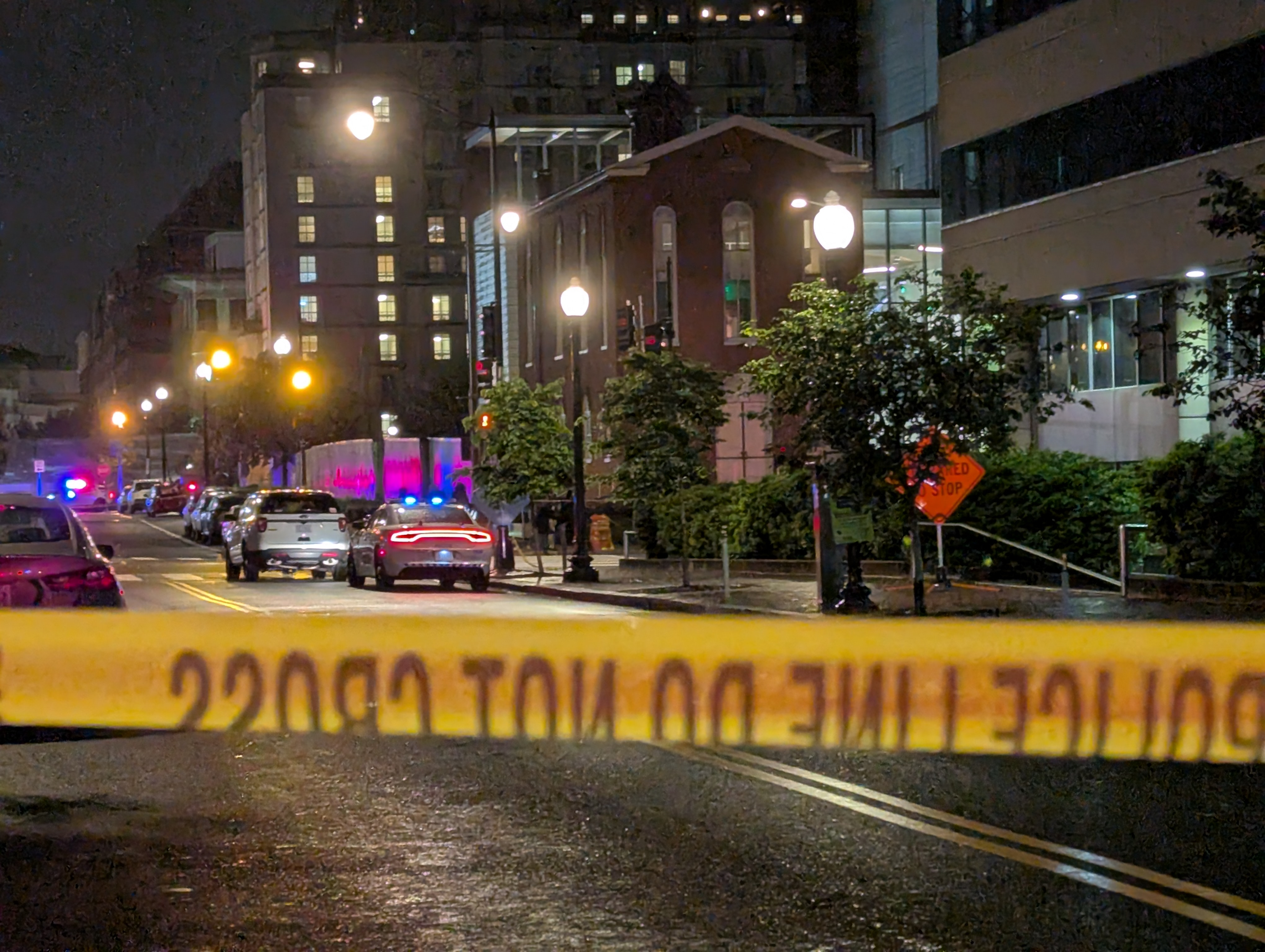
- Police tape cordoning off the museum after the shooting
- Location: Outside the Capital Jewish Museum, Washington, D.C., U.S.
- Date: May 21, 2025; 17 months ago 9:08 p.m. (EDT)
- Weapon: 9mm Heckler & Koch VP9 SK semi-automatic handgun
- Deaths: 2
- Victims: Yaron Lischinsky; Sarah Milgrim
- Accused: Elias Rodriguez

On May 21, 2025, two Israeli Embassy staff members were shot and killed outside the Capital Jewish Museum in Washington, D.C. The gunman opened fire at approximately 9:08 p.m. as victims Yaron Lischinsky and Sarah Milgrim were leaving a "Young Diplomats Reception" hosted by the American Jewish Committee.

The suspect, 31-year-old Elias Rodriguez of Chicago, was apprehended by event security staff inside the museum, where witnesses reported he pulled out a keffiyeh and said "I did it. I did it for Gaza" and chanted "Free, free Palestine!" while in custody.

Federal prosecutors subsequently charged Rodriguez with first-degree murder, federal hate crimes, and terrorism-related offenses, and the Department of Justice announced it would seek the death penalty. Amid heightened tensions surrounding the Gaza war, the attack drew widespread international condemnation and heightened security concerns across Jewish institutions amid rising antisemitism in the United States.

== Background ==
The Capital Jewish Museum, housed within Adas Israel Congregation, one of Washington, D.C.'s oldest synagogues founded in 1876—is a Jewish cultural institution that opened approximately two years before the attack. It is situated in the city's center, less than a mile from Capitol Hill and about 1.3 miles (2 km) from the White House.

Historically, Israeli diplomats and embassy staff have been targeted by violence linked to the longstanding Israeli–Palestinian conflict by both Palestinian militants and state-backed actors. The Embassy of Israel, Washington, D.C. has been the site of several protests since the Gaza war began. Shortly before the incident, the museum received a grant intended to enhance security for local non-profit organizations. Museum leaders expressed concerns about safety due to the museum's Jewish identity as well as a new LGBTQ exhibit.

== Shooting ==
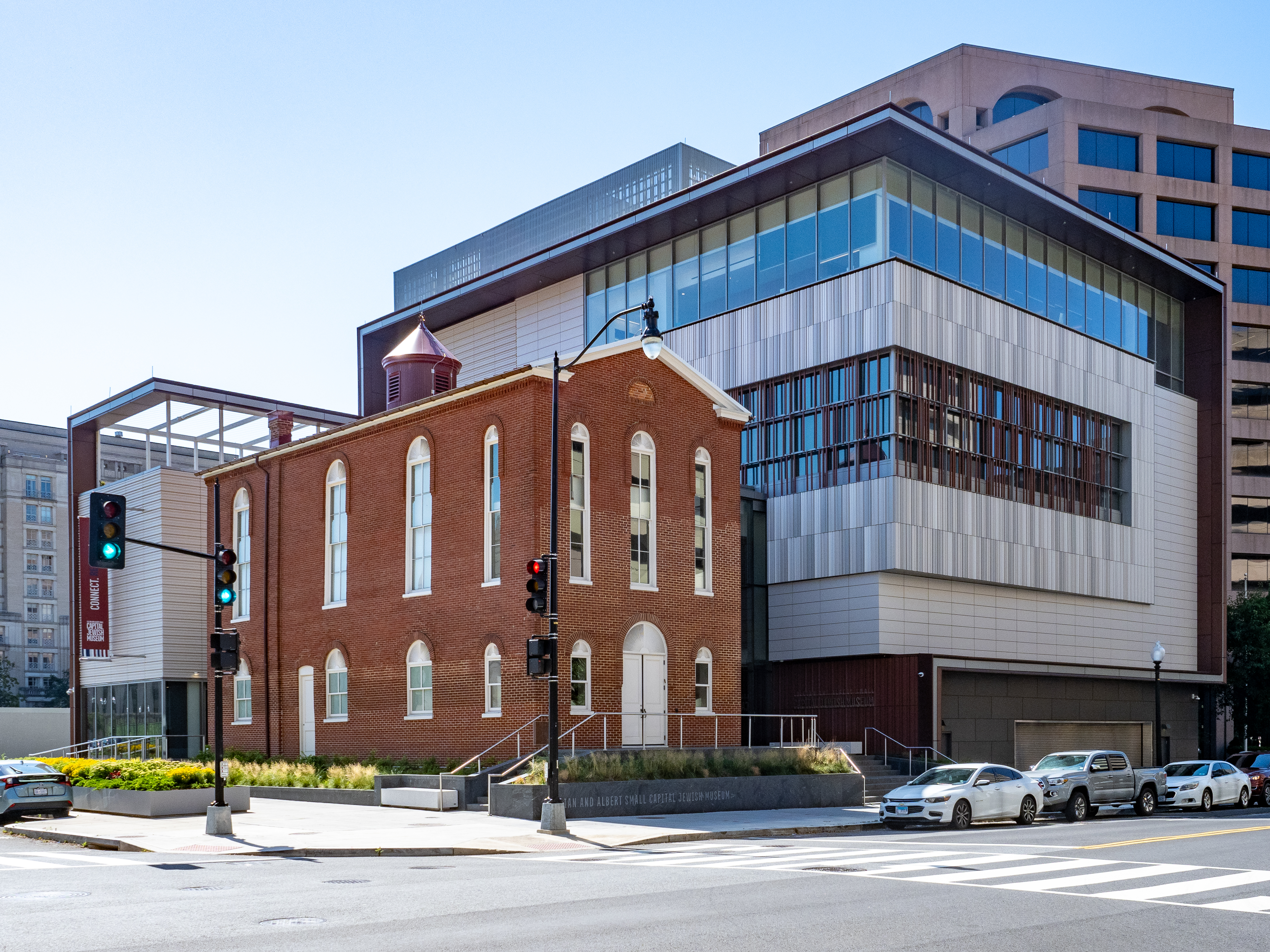
The Capital Jewish Museum in 2024

According to Metropolitan Police Department chief Pamela Smith, the suspect arrested at the scene of the shooting had been pacing outside the Lillian & Albert Small Capital Jewish Museum before the killing. The museum was hosting the AJC ACCESS Young Diplomats Reception organized by the American Jewish Committee. According to the invitation, the gathering aimed to bring together "Jewish young professionals and the D.C. diplomatic community for an evening dedicated to fostering unity and celebrating Jewish heritage." AJC described the event as a cocktail reception for professionals and diplomats focused on humanitarian diplomacy in the Middle East and North Africa. JoJo Kalin, an organizer, stated the event was centered on building a coalition to support Gazans amid the ongoing war.

At approximately 9:08 p.m. on May 21, 2025, the suspect opened fire with a handgun on four individuals, two of whom were Yaron Lischinsky and Sarah Milgrim, a couple and Israeli embassy aides, who were fatally shot as they were leaving the museum. Israeli government officials said that other embassy employees were injured in the shooting. According to Smith, after the shooting, the suspect walked into the museum and was stopped by security staff before being detained. Eyewitnesses in the museum said that the suspect looked distressed and had initially been helped and given water before he identified himself as the shooter, and asked for police. He was taken into custody. On September 5, The Washington Post reported that, according to court filings, the shooting was captured on surveillance video.

== Victims ==
The two victims, Yaron Lischinsky and Sarah Milgrim, were a couple. Lischinsky was a German-Israeli staff member at the Israeli Embassy, working as a research assistant with responsibilities that included monitoring developments in the Middle East. Milgrim was an American Jew working in the public diplomacy department, responsible for community relations. The couple likely met through their embassy assignments. Lischinsky moved from Nuremberg in Bavaria, Germany, to Israel at the age of 16 before relocating to Washington to work for the embassy. According to Yechiel Leiter, the Israeli ambassador to the United States, the couple was planning to become engaged in Jerusalem the following week.

== Suspect ==
Elias Rodriguez (born 1994), a 31-year-old Chicago man, was arrested as the suspect after being apprehended by event security staff. He pulled out a red keffiyeh and chanted "Free, free Palestine!" as he was taken into custody. Initial reports state that Rodriguez had no prior contact with police. In 2017, Rodriguez was briefly associated with the left-wing Party for Socialism and Liberation. Rodriguez lived in an apartment complex at Chicago's Albany Park neighborhood prior to the shooting.

=== Manifesto ===
Journalist Ken Klippenstein published Rodriguez's alleged manifesto which was posted to X. The manifesto denounced Israel as a "genocidal apartheid state" and called for violent action to stop the Gaza genocide, writing, "The action would have been morally justified taken 11 years ago during Protective Edge... I am glad that today at least there are many Americans for which the action will be highly legible and, in some funny way, the only sane thing to do."

According to The Forward, the same X account, @kyotoleather, mixed posts against Israel with unrelated memes and apparent jokes. It was created in 2013, but its first post was on October 21, 2023, about two weeks after the October 7 attacks: "This baby in Chicago says #FreePalestine and what she says goes."

== Investigation ==
The museum the day after the shooting

The Federal Bureau of Investigation and D.C. police are investigating the killing. According to The Washington Post, authorities initially believed the suspect had specifically targeted the event at the museum, but had not singled out any single individual before arriving at the scene.

== Legal proceedings ==
After the shooting, the suspect was charged with two counts of first-degree murder, murder of foreign officials and other charges, such as causing the death of a person through the use of a firearm during a crime of violence. While the first-degree murder charges were filed as a violation of the Code of the District of Columbia, which does not have capital punishment, the charges of murdering a foreign official and use of a firearm causing death were filed as federal offenses that are potentially punishable by death. The charges were laid out in a criminal complaint. According to Jeanine Pirro, the interim U.S. attorney for the District of Columbia, the suspect appeared in court on May 22 and was informed by a judge that if he is convicted, he may face life imprisonment or the death penalty. That same day, Pirro said it was "far too early" to decide whether to seek the death penalty in the case.

On August 7, 2025, the Department of Justice (DoJ) announced an indictment of Rodriguez on federal hate crime charges, firearms offenses, first-degree murder, armed assault with intent to kill, and the murder of a foreign official. On September 4, Rodriguez pleaded not guilty to the hate crime and murder charges.

On January 17, 2026, U.S. Attorney General Pam Bondi announced the DoJ would seek the death penalty for Rodriguez, stating that "antisemitism has gone unchecked in the United States," citing hate crimes such as the arson at the Beth Israel Congregation in Jackson, Mississippi, two weeks earlier, and emphasizing the ideological motivation alleged in the case.

In February 2026, U.S. federal prosecutors unveiled an expanded indictment against Rodriguez, adding multiple terrorism-related counts to the charges stemming from the May 21, 2025, shooting. The indictment alleges that Rodriguez carried out the attack with the intent to "influence government policy through intimidation" and to "coerce a significant portion of the civilian population" Prosecutors assert that Rodriguez authored a 900-word manifesto titled "Escalate For Gaza, Bring The War Home," in which he attempted to morally justify the violence as "the only sane thing to do" and sought to inspire others to commit similar acts. According to the indictment, Rodriguez fired approximately 20 rounds at embassy employees while reportedly shouting “Free Palestine” and includes counts of hate crimes, murder of foreign officials, and armed assault with intent to kill, all of which carry potential penalties of life imprisonment or the death penalty. Prosecutors also assert that Rodriguez authored writings intended to justify his actions and encourage similar attacks.

== Responses ==
=== Domestic ===
The organizer of the event called the suspect evil and said he looked distraught. U.S. President Donald Trump condemned the acts via a post on Truth Social shortly after the shooting, stating: "These horrible DC killings, based obviously on antisemitism, must end, NOW!". He added that "Hatred and Radicalism have no place in the USA." U.S. Secretary of Homeland Security Kristi Noem and U.S. Attorney General Pam Bondi vowed to prosecute the suspect.

U.S. Senate Minority Leader Chuck Schumer denounced the killings, as did Washington D.C. Mayor Muriel Bowser. Speaker of the U.S. House of Representatives Mike Johnson also condemned the shooting, calling it a "horrific attack, obviously an antisemitic attack". Other politicians also condemned the shooting such as Alexandria Ocasio-Cortez, Rashida Tlaib, and Zohran Mamdani.

Some online social media accounts celebrated the shooting with one comparing Rodriguez to Luigi Mangione. An account on TikTok belonging to prominent social media influencer Guy Christensen said he refused to condemn the murder of "Zionists officials" and told his followers that "I want to urge you first to support Elias' actions".

=== International ===
Yechiel Leiter, Israeli ambassador to the United States, described the murders as part of the eighth front in Israel's war, what he called "The war to demonize, delegitimize and to eradicate the right of the state of Israel to exist". Israeli ambassador to the United Nations Danny Danon called the killings "anti-Semitic terrorism". In a post on X (formerly Twitter), Israeli President Isaac Herzog wrote that Israel and the U.S. "will stand united in defense of our people and our shared values. Terror and hate will not break us." Israeli Prime Minister Benjamin Netanyahu condemned the attack. He said that he ordered strengthened security at Israeli embassies worldwide. Other nations and groups to condemn the killings included the European Union, France, Germany, India, Italy, the United Arab Emirates, and the United Kingdom.

== See also ==
- List of attacks against Israeli embassies and diplomats
- List of antisemitic incidents in the United States
- 1977 Washington, D.C., attack and hostage taking
- Jewish Museum of Belgium shooting
- 2025 Boulder fire attack
