= Zalman Shoval =

Israeli banker, politician and diplomat

- זלמן שובל
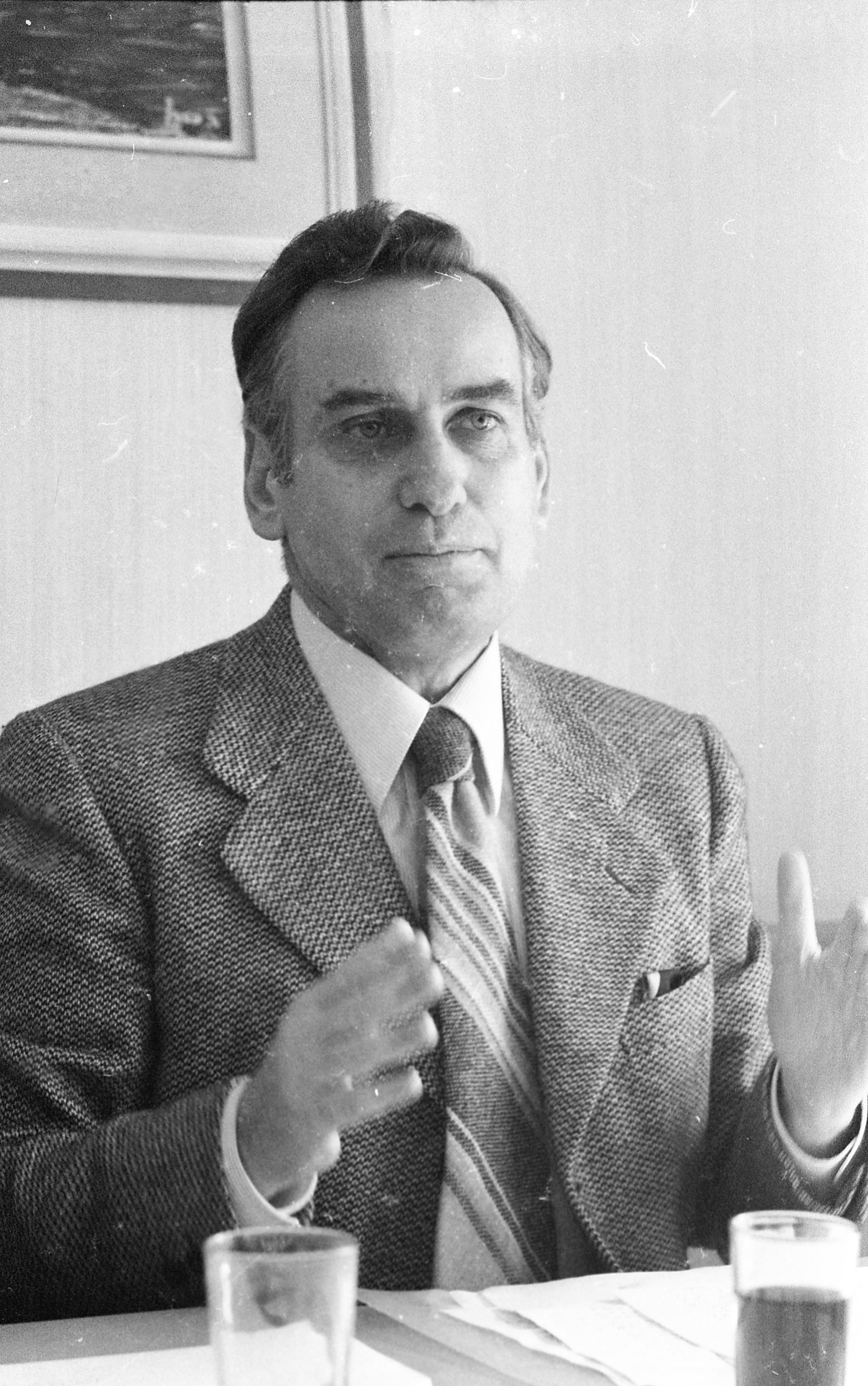

Ambassador to the United States
- In office 1990–1993, 1998–2000

Faction represented in the Knesset
- 1970–1974: National List
- 1974–1981: Likud
- 1981: Rafi - State List
- 1981: Telem
- 1988–1990: Likud

Personal details
- Born: 28 April 1930 (age 96) Danzig, Free City of Danzig

Zalman Shoval (Hebrew: זלמן שובל; born 28 April 1930) is an Israeli banker, politician and diplomat. He is also active in Israel's economic life. He was the Israeli ambassador to the United States in the years 1990–1993 and 1998–2000, and an active member of the Knesset in the Rafi-State List, and the Likud party.

== Biography ==
Shoval was born in Danzig, Free City of Danzig (present-day Gdańsk, Poland), then home to a large Jewish community, as the son of a Jewish family originating in Eastern Europe. His father was born in Latvia. They immigrated to Mandatory Palestine in 1938. Shoval attended first the Ben-Yehuda School and then the "Geula" high school in Tel Aviv before obtaining a BA at UC Berkeley, and an MA at the Graduate Institute of International and Development Studies in Geneva. Between 1955 and 1957 he was a cadet in the Ministry Foreign Affairs, after which he became involved in finance, twice serving as chairman of the Bankers Association Council. He served as an intelligence officer in the Israel Defense Forces and during the Suez Crisis was an IDF liaison to the British and French militaries. He subsequently did reserve duty in intelligence roles as well as with the IDF Spokesperson's Unit.

Shoval joined David Ben-Gurion when he left to found Rafi in 1965, and then again when Ben-Gurion founded the State List in 1969. In the elections that year he narrowly missed out on being elected to the Knesset; Shoval was placed fifth on the party's list, but it won only four seats. When Ben-Gurion resigned from the Knesset in May 1970, however, Shoval took his place.

Shortly before the 1973 elections, the State List joined other groups to form the Likud, and Shoval was returned to the Knesset as a Likud MK. Re-elected in 1977, he was responsible for information in Foreign Affairs Ministry as a deputy to Foreign Minister Moshe Dayan and was responsible for the P.R. and information aspects of the 1978 Camp David Conference. Before that (1977), he served as a member of Israel's delegation to the U.N.

In January 1981 Shoval and two other Likud MKs (Yigal Hurvitz and Yitzhak Peretz) broke away from the party to form Telem with Moshe Dayan. In the 1981 elections, however, Telem won only two mandates, and Shoval lost his seat. In 1984 Hurvitz and Shoval formed Ometz. Whilst he missed out on election to the Knesset in that year's elections, Rafi-Ometz merged back into Likud in 1986, and in 1988 Shoval was elected back into the Knesset as a Likud MK.

Shoval resigned from the Knesset in October 1990 in order to become Israeli Ambassador to the United States, a post he held until 1993, and again between 1998 and 2000. During his first tenure as Israel's Ambassador he had been closely involved in matters relating to the Gulf War and its aftermath and later participated in the Madrid peace conference (1991), and after that he was a member of the Israeli team negotiating with the Jordanians and Palestinians. In 1998 he was a member of the Israeli delegation headed by Prime Minister Benjamin Netanyahu at the U.S. sponsored Wye River Conference and he was closely involved in the diplomatic negotiations with the U.S. administration before and after the above conference. He continued in this task after the change of the Israeli government in May 1999. In March 1999 he was given the award of "Diplomat of the Year" by the Los Angeles World Affairs Council.

Shoval, together with a number of friends, in 1977 founded the "Moshe Dayan Public Forum for Political and Social Questions", a non-partisan public affairs society, and in 1983 he was among the founders of the "Dayan Center for Middle Eastern Studies" at Tel Aviv University, and is a member of its board of trustees. He is also a member of the Board of Trustees of "The Interdisciplinary Center (IDC), Herzliya, and is the Past-Chairman of the Center's Institute of Policy and Strategy, which organizes the annual "Herzliya Conference". He was a member of the Board of Directors of the Hadassah Medical Organization. Shoval was, until his appointment as Ambassador, Chairman of the New Israel Opera. In the later 1990s, he partnered up with Israeli businessperson Shlomo Grofman. Together, they established Faire Fund for real estates project such as HaYarkon 96 and Shoval-Grofman Real Estate Limited.

Shoval is a member of the Board of Trustees of Tel Aviv and Ben Gurion Universities, of the Dayan Center and of the International Board of Governors of the Ariel University Center of Samaria. Shoval is a member of all the Likud's Central Bodies. In December 1997, he was unanimously elected President of the "World Likud", a post from which he resigned upon assuming the position of Israel's Ambassador to Washington. In 2009, Prime Minister Netanyahu asked him to head an Advisory "Forum" on U.S.-Israel relations. He holds the rank of Lieutenant-Colonel (res.) in the I.D.F.

== Books ==
- A View From The Stage, Tel Aviv, 1991
- Diplomat, Yediot Books, 2016
- Jerusalem and Washington: A Life in Politics and Diplomacy, Rowman and Littlefield, 2018
