= Meir Avizohar =

Israeli politician (1923–2008)

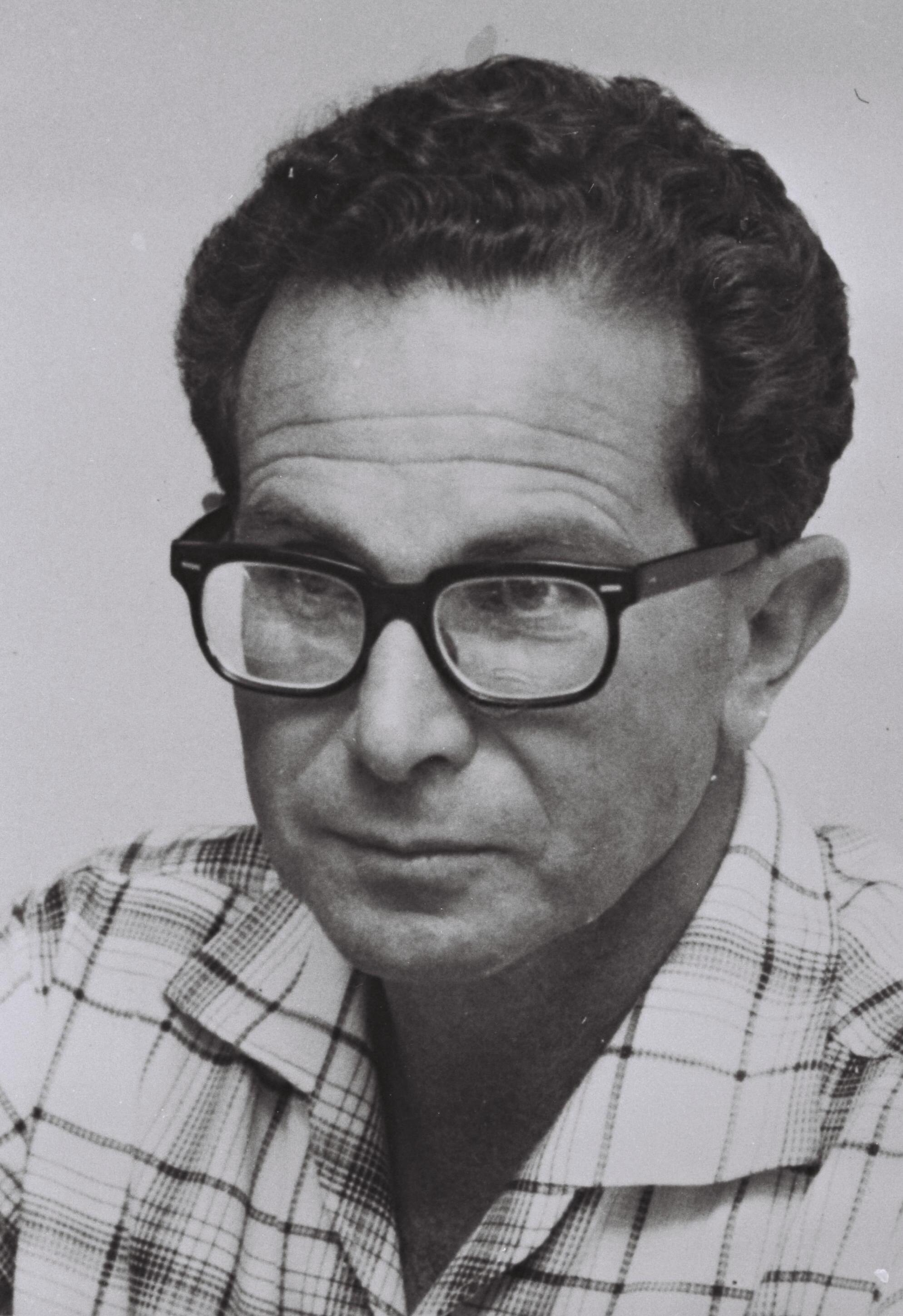
- Avizohar in 1969

Faction represented in the Knesset
- 1969–1972: National List
- 1972–1973: Independent
- 1973–1974: Alignment

Personal details
- Born: 27 September 1923 Jerusalem, Mandatory Palestine
- Died: 31 August 2008 (aged 84)

Meir Avizohar (Hebrew: מאיר אביזוהר; 27 September 1923 – 31 August 2008) was an Israeli politician who served as a member of the Knesset between 1969 and 1974.

== Biography ==
Born in Jerusalem during the Mandate era, he attended high school at Hebrew University Secondary School. Later he studied at the Hebrew University of Jerusalem and London School of Economics, earning a PhD. He was a member of the HaMahanot HaOlim youth movement and kibbutz Hamadia, and joined Mapai in 1944.

In 1950 he was amongst the founders of Eilat. Between 1952 and 1953 he was director of the Negev and Arava department of the Ministry of Development. In 1961 he became a member of the editorial board at Davar, on which he remained until 1965. In the same year he left Mapai and joined David Ben-Gurion's new Rafi party. When Ben-Gurion left Rafi to establish the National List, Avizohar followed, and was elected to the Knesset on the new party's list in the 1969 elections. On 24 April 1972 he left the National List, sitting as an Independent until joining the Alignment on 17 July 1973. He lost his seat in the 1973 elections.

In 1970 he started lecturing at Tel Aviv University. He became a senior lecturer at Bar-Ilan University in 1979, and later headed the Ben-Gurion Heritage Institute in Midreshet Ben-Gurion, where he was involved with publishing Ben-Gurion's memoirs and diaries. He died in 2008 at age 84.
