= Yitzhak Peretz =

Yitzhak Peretz may refer to:

- Yitzhak Peretz (politician born 1936), Israeli politician who served as Deputy Minister of Industry, Trade and Tourism
- Yitzhak Peretz (politician born 1938), Chief Rabbi of Raanana and a former Israeli politician who served as Minister of Internal Affairs, Minister of Immigrant Absorption and Minister without Portfolio
