= National List =

Political party in Israel

National List רשימה ממלכתית
- Leader: David Ben-Gurion (1969–1970); Yigal Hurvitz (1970–1976); Yitzhak Peretz (1981)
- Founded: 1969 (original); 1981 (reformed)
- Dissolved: 1976 (original); 1981 (reformed)
- Split from: Rafi (original); La'am (reformed)
- Merged into: Likud; La'am (original); La'am (reformed)
- Ideology: Liberal Zionism; Social liberalism
- Political position: Centre
- National affiliation: Likud
- International affiliation: Liberal International
- Alliance: Likud (1973–1976)
- Most MKs: 5 (1974–1976)
- Fewest MKs: 1 (1981)

Election symbol

The National List (Hebrew: רשימה ממלכתית, Reshima Mamlakhtit; also translated as the State List), was a political party in Israel. It was founded by David Ben-Gurion, Israel’s first Prime Minister and a leading figure in Labor Zionism. The party is one of the ancestors of Likud.

== Background ==
=== Original party (1969–1976) ===
The National List was established by David Ben-Gurion prior to the 1969 Israeli legislative election, following the merger of his previous party, Rafi—founded in 1965 after splitting from Mapai—with Mapai and Ahdut HaAvoda to form the Israeli Labor Party in 1968, a move Ben-Gurion opposed.

In the 1969 election, the National List won four seats in the seventh Knesset, represented by Ben-Gurion, Meir Avizohar, Isser Harel, and Yigal Hurvitz. During the Knesset term, Avizohar defected to the Alignment, reducing the party’s representation to three seats. Ben-Gurion resigned from the Knesset in 1970 and was succeeded by Zalman Shoval.

Following Ben-Gurion's departure, the party gradually declined. Ahead of the 1973 Israeli legislative election, the National List joined the Likud alliance, which included Herut and the Israeli Liberal Party (already allied as Gahal), the Free Centre, and the Movement for Greater Israel. The alliance won 39 seats, with Hurvitz and Shoval elected as National List representatives on the Likud slate.

In 1976, the National List merged with the Movement for Greater Israel and the Independent Centre (a splinter group from the Free Centre) to form the La'am faction within Likud, ceasing to exist as an independent party.

=== Reformed party (1981) ===
The National List was briefly revived during the ninth Knesset in 1981, when Hurvitz, Shoval, and Yitzhak Peretz left Likud to form Rafi – National List.

On 19 May 1981, Shoval and Hurvitz departed to establish Telem with Moshe Dayan, while Peretz renamed the remaining group Rafi before rejoining Likud on 27 May.

Peretz then briefly re-established the National List, though it existed for only 12 days before merging back into Likud.

In 1983, Hurvitz left Telem to form Rafi – National List once again, later renaming it Ometz.
