= Movement for the Renewal of Social Zionism =

Movement for the Renewal of Social Zionism תנועה להתחדשות ציונית חברתית
- Leader: Mordechai Ben-Porat
- Founded: 1970s
- Dissolved: 1980s
- Split from: Telem
- Merged into: Likud
- Ideology: Zionism
- Most MKs: 1 (1983–1984)
- Fewest MKs: 0 (1984)

Election symbol
- זה

The Movement for the Renewal of Social Zionism (Hebrew: תנועה להתחדשות ציונית חברתית, Tenoa'a LeHithadshut Tzionut Hevratit) was a short-lived minor political party in Israel.

== Background ==
Headed by Mordechai Ben-Porat, the party contested the 1977 Knesset elections, but missed out on winning a seat by 0.2%.

Ben-Porat subsequently joined Telem and was elected to the Knesset on its list in 1981. However, after becoming a Minister without Portfolio, he left Telem and established the Movement for the Renewal of Social Zionism as a Knesset faction on 6 June 1983 by Minister, following the break-up of (its other member, Yigael Hurvitz, refounded Rafi – National List).

The party failed to cross the electoral threshold in the 1984 elections and subsequently disappeared. Ben-Porat moved on, joining Likud in 1988.
