= Yitzhak Peretz (politician born 1936) =

Israeli politician

- יצחק פרץ
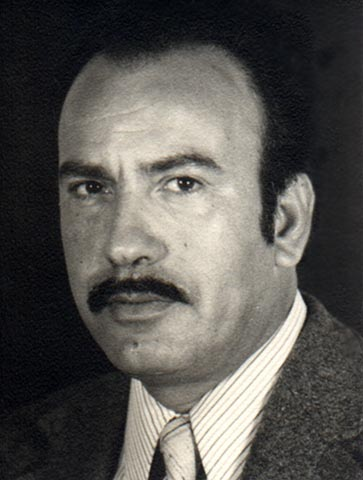

Faction represented in the Knesset
- 1974–1981: Likud
- 1981: Rafi - National List
- 1981: National List
- 1981–1982: Likud
- 1982–1988: Alignment

Personal details
- Born: 3 June 1936 Casablanca, Morocco
- Died: 17 October 2002 (aged 66)

Yitzhak Peretz (Hebrew: יצחק פרץ; 3 June 1936 – 17 October 2002) was an Israeli politician who served as a member of the Knesset between 1974 and 1988.

== Biography ==
Born in Casablanca in French Morocco in 1936, Peretz made aliyah to Israel in 1950. He attended the Mikveh Yisrael agricultural high school, and later Bar-Ilan University. In 1956 he joined Mapai. He worked as a teacher in Rishon LeZion between 1957 and 1963. In 1963 he became a member of Dimona city council. Two years later he joined the new Rafi, and following its leader David Ben-Gurion when he broke away to establish the National List in 1968.

In 1971 he became mayor of Dimona, a post he held until 1974 when he was elected to the Knesset on the Likud list (an alliance of Herut, the Liberal Party, the Free Centre, the National List and the Movement for Greater Israel). He was re-elected on the Likud list in 1977. On 28 June 1977 he was appointed Deputy Minister of Industry, Trade, and Tourism, a post he held until 15 January 1979. On 26 January 1981, along with Yigal Hurvitz and Zalman Shoval, he briefly left Likud to establish Rafi - National List and then (by himself) the National List on 19 May, before returning to Likud on 27 May.

After being re-elected later that year, Peretz and Amnon Linn defected to the Alignment on 26 October 1982. He was re-elected on the Alignment list in 1984, before losing his seat in the 1988 elections.

Outside his Knesset activities, Peretz became a member of the directorate of the World Sephardi Federation in 1969, before joining its presidium the following year. From 1978 until 1982 he chaired the Zionist Executive Committee, and from 1979 until 1982 was chairman of the Jewish National Fund's Galilee Development Fund.

He died in 2002 at the age of 66.
