= Mathilda Guez =

Israeli politician (1918–1990)

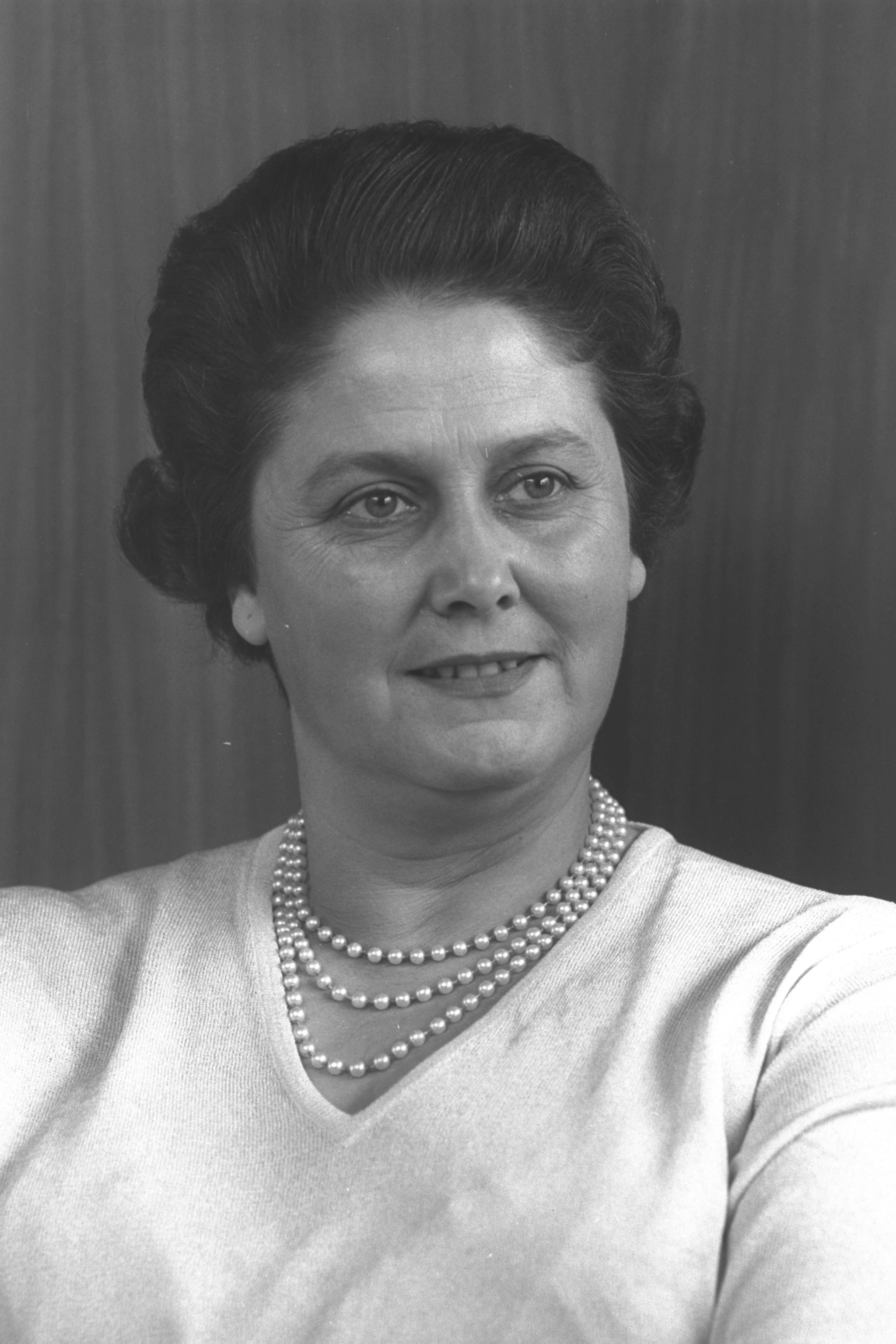
- Guez in 1965

Faction represented in the Knesset
- 1965–1968: Rafi
- 1968–1969: Labor Party
- 1969–1977: Alignment

Personal details
- Born: 15 August 1918; Sousse, Tunisia
- Died: 3 May 1990 (aged 71)

Mathilda Guez (Hebrew: מטילדה גז; 15 August 1918 – 3 May 1990) was an Israeli politician who served as a member of the Knesset for Rafi and its successors from 1965 until 1977.

== Biography ==
Born in Sousse in Tunisia, Guez was educated at a French high school. In 1936 she married and moved to Sfax. During World War II she was deported along with the rest of the local Jewish community. After the family returned to their homes, she became involved in Zionist activities; in 1948 she became a member of Youth Aliyah, and was also president of the Tunisian branch of WIZO.

In 1957 she emigrated to Israel after meeting David Ben-Gurion during a trip to Jerusalem, and joined Mapai, working in its Immigrant Absorption department. In 1959 Guez became a member of the World Jewish Congress directorate. Along with Ben-Gurion, she was amongst the Mapai members that left to form Rafi in 1965, and was elected to the Knesset on the new party's list later that year. She was re-elected in 1969 (by which time Rafi had merged into the Alignment) and 1973, before losing her seat in the 1977 elections.

She died in 1990 at the age of 71.
