= 1969 Israeli embassies and El Al attacks =

1969 terrorist attack in Europe

- Location: Bonn, West Germany; Brussels, Belgium; The Hague, the Netherlands
- Date: 8 September 1969
- Attack type: Grenade attacks, bombs
- Deaths: 0
- Injuries: 4
- Perpetrator: Popular Front for the Liberation of Palestine

On 8 September 1969, three Israeli linked sites in Europe were attacked by Palestinians with grenades and bombs within minutes of each other. The attacks targeted two Israeli embassies, in Bonn, West Germany and in The Hague, the Netherlands, and El Al airline offices in Brussels, Belgium. Three El Al employees and one customer were wounded in the Brussels attack, while none were hurt in the other attacks.

== Aftermath ==
In response to the attack, Dutch police guarded the El Al office in Amsterdam, while police reinforcements were sent to Schiphol Airport where passengers boarding El Al and KLM flights for Tel Aviv were searched for weapons to avert a possible new aerial hijacking. The Netherlands' Chief of Protocol also phoned the Israeli Ambassador Shimshon Arad to convey Foreign Minister Joseph Luns' message of shock and outrage over the bombing of the Israeli Embassy.

The attackers were three adult Palestinians accompanied by three Palestinian youths aged 14 to 15 years old. A spokesperson for the Popular Front for the Liberation of Palestine (PFLP) in Amman, Jordan claimed responsibility for the attacks, stating that the attackers were among its "Tiger Cubs". Following the attacks, the PFLP also announced that it now planned an "all-out terrorist campaign against Israeli business organizations abroad."

While the adults fled to Syria via Budapest and East Berlin, the youths took refuge respectively in the Saudi Arabian embassy in Bonn, the Tunisian embassy in Brussels, and the Algerian embassy in The Hague. The adult in Brussels was sentenced to 5 years in prison in absentia, charged with giving hand grenades to two youths, aged 12 and 16 years old, with instructions to throw them into the El Al office. While one of the youths escaped, the other was caught and would be tried behind closed doors at the Brussels Children’s Court. The 15-year-old in The Hague was sentenced to three months in a reformatory school. The youth in Brussels who escaped was reported to have flown to Baghdad with the aid of the Iraqi embassy in Paris.

The attacks have been cited as the first example of the militant use of children for the Palestinian cause, and investigations later found that the youths had been recruited by Fatah.

== See also ==
- List of attacks against Israeli embassies and diplomats
