= Lillian & Albert Small Capital Jewish Museum =

Institution in Washington, D.C., United States

Capital Jewish Museum
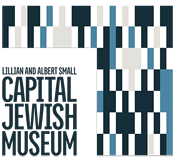

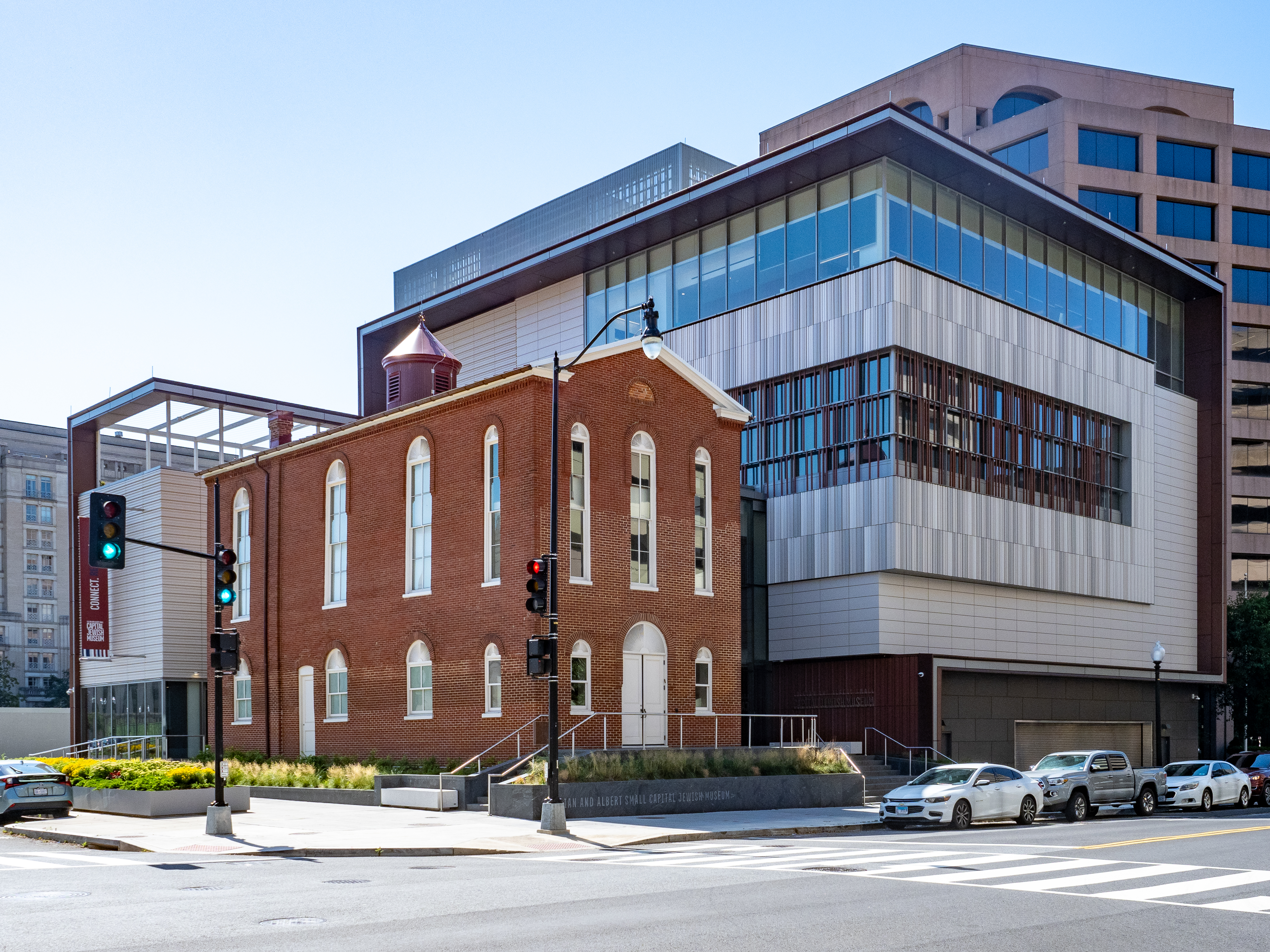
- Former name: Lillia & Albert Small Jewish Museum; Jewish Historical Society of Greater Washington
- Established: 1975 (museum); 1960 (historical society)
- Location: 575 3rd Street NW, Washington, D.C. 20008
- Coordinates: 38°53′50″N 77°00′54″W
- Type: Jewish museum; History museum
- Website: capitaljewishmuseum.org
- Adas Israel Synagogue (original)
- U.S. National Register of Historic Places
- D.C. Inventory of Historic Sites
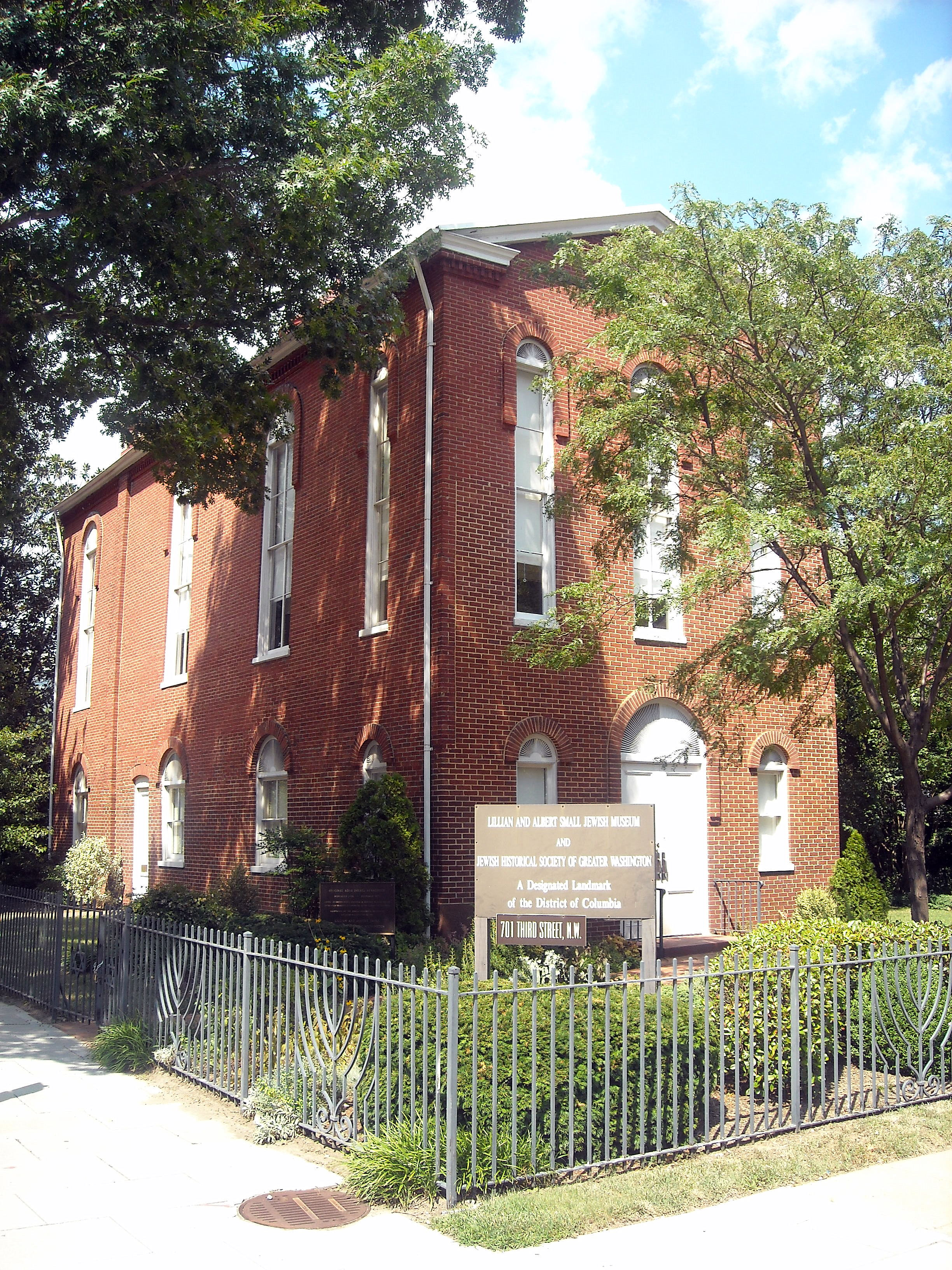
- Adas Israel Synagogue in 2008
- Built: 1876
- Architect: Max Kleinman; J. William & Co.
- NRHP reference No.: 69000288

Significant dates
- Added to NRHP: March 24, 1969
- Designated DCIHS: March 7, 1968

The Capital Jewish Museum, officially the Lillian & Albert Small Capital Jewish Museum, is a historical society and museum in Washington, D.C., focused on the history of Jewish life in the American capital city and the surrounding Washington metropolitan area.

Formerly known as the Jewish Historical Society of Greater Washington (JHSGW), the organization adopted a new name in 2018 as it prepared for the opening of its new museum. The organization was founded in 1960 and incorporated as a nonprofit organization in 1965. From 1975 to 2016, it operated the Lillian & Albert Small Jewish Museum in the historic Adas Israel Synagogue building, an 1876 structure that is the oldest surviving synagogue in the city. The synagogue building has been moved three times in its history, with a final move in 2019 to become part of the Capital Jewish Museum.

== Museum ==
The Capital Jewish Museum, which opened in 2023, is a 32,500-square-foot (3,020-square-meter) facility located in the Judiciary Square and Capitol Crossing neighborhood of Northwest Washington. The four-story building at 3rd and F Streets NW includes three floors of exhibit and programming space. It incorporates the historic synagogue that formerly housed the museum, with the sanctuary "restored to its original appearance."

The museum refers to the historic synagogue as the "centerpiece" and "largest artifact" of the new museum. Other artifacts in the museum's collection include a lace collar worn by U.S. Supreme Court Justice Ruth Bader Ginsburg; a notebook used by Supreme Court Justice Louis Brandeis; photographs of Jewish life in Washington, such as a 1925 image of President Calvin Coolidge dedicating a local Jewish Community Center; a banner carried by Jewish lobbyist Hyman Bookbinder at the 1963 March on Washington; a kippah (yarmulke) from a White House Hanukkah celebration; and items from local Jewish businesses and families, such as a bookstore sign and a wedding cup.

== Adas Israel Synagogue ==
The historic Adas Israel Synagogue was built in 1876 at 6th and G Streets, Northwest to house the Adas Israel Congregation. President of the United States Ulysses S. Grant attended the synagogue's dedication on June 9, 1876, marking the first Jewish service attended by a sitting president. The building is the oldest surviving synagogue building in the District of Columbia.

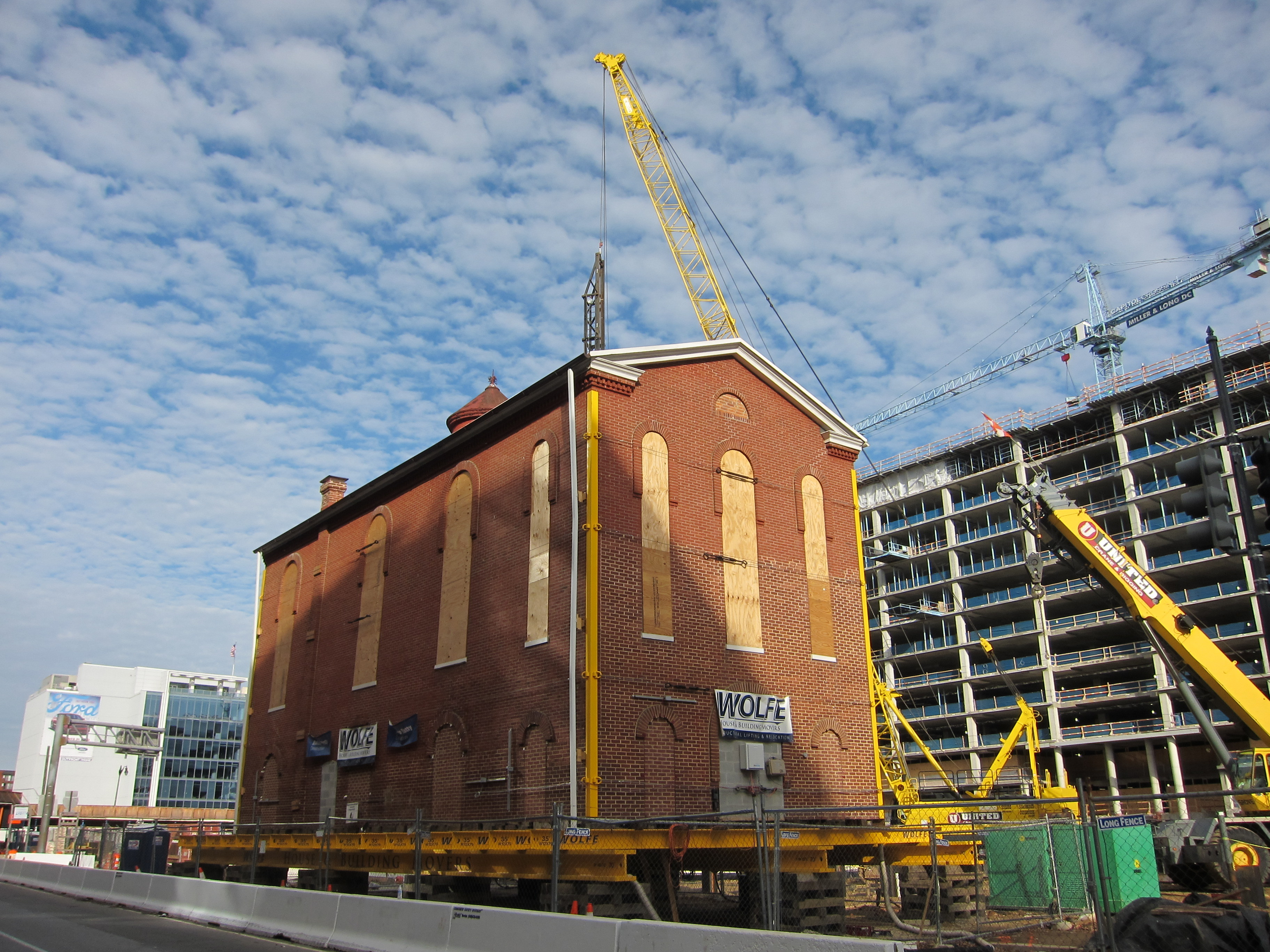
Adas Israel Synagogue being moved in 2017. This was the second time the building has been relocated.

Over the following decades, an influx of immigrants from Eastern Europe and Russia swelled the congregation's numbers. The congregation continued to worship in the original synagogue until 1908, when a new building at Sixth and I Streets, NW was dedicated. The congregation later moved again, and the latter building is known today as the Sixth & I Historic Synagogue.

The original 1876 building was sold to Stephen Gatti, an Italian-American fruit dealer and real estate investor who lived a block away. In the 1910s, Saint Sophia's Greek Orthodox Church worshiped in the second-floor sanctuary. A succession of churches followed in the 1920s to 1940s. During the course of the next 60 years, the former synagogue's first floor was divided into retail spaces and housed a bicycle shop, barber, Joseph Funger's grocery store, Anthony Litteri's delicatessen, and other businesses.

In the 1960s, plans for the construction of the Washington Metropolitan Area Transit Authority headquarters at the 6th and G intersection threatened the building with demolition. With the support of federal and city agencies, the Jewish Historical Society of Greater Washington arranged to move the building three city blocks to Third and G Streets, NW. On September 1, 1969, President Richard Nixon signed a law authorizing the District of Columbia government to purchase the building and lease it to the Society for historic preservation purposes at $1 a year for 99 years.

The historic synagogue building was restored by the Jewish Historical Society of Greater Washington and became the home of the Lillian & Albert Small Jewish Museum starting in 1975.

The historic synagogue building is listed on the National Register of Historic Places, the District of Columbia Inventory of Historic Sites, and Historic American Buildings Survey. It is among the oldest synagogue buildings still standing in the United States. It is also an official project of the Save America's Treasures program.

=== Relocation to Capital Jewish Museum site (2016–21) ===
Starting in 2016, the development of the Capitol Crossing project required the building to move again, as the District of Columbia government sold the land on which it sat. In response, the museum was closed so that the building could be moved to a new permanent home, where it would re-open as part of a new museum building that would be constructed around the historic synagogue.

The move proceeded in two stages. First, the structure was moved about 50 feet to a temporary location on Third Street NW, to await the construction of a parking garage that would serve as its permanent base. Then, in early 2019, the building was moved to its final stop at the corner of Third and F Streets, NW. Local elected officials attended the move and gave speeches, and Washington Rabbi Hannah Spiro offered a traveler's prayer. At the new location, the synagogue faces east, in accordance with Jewish custom and was integrated into the design of the Capital Jewish Museum.

== 2025 shooting ==
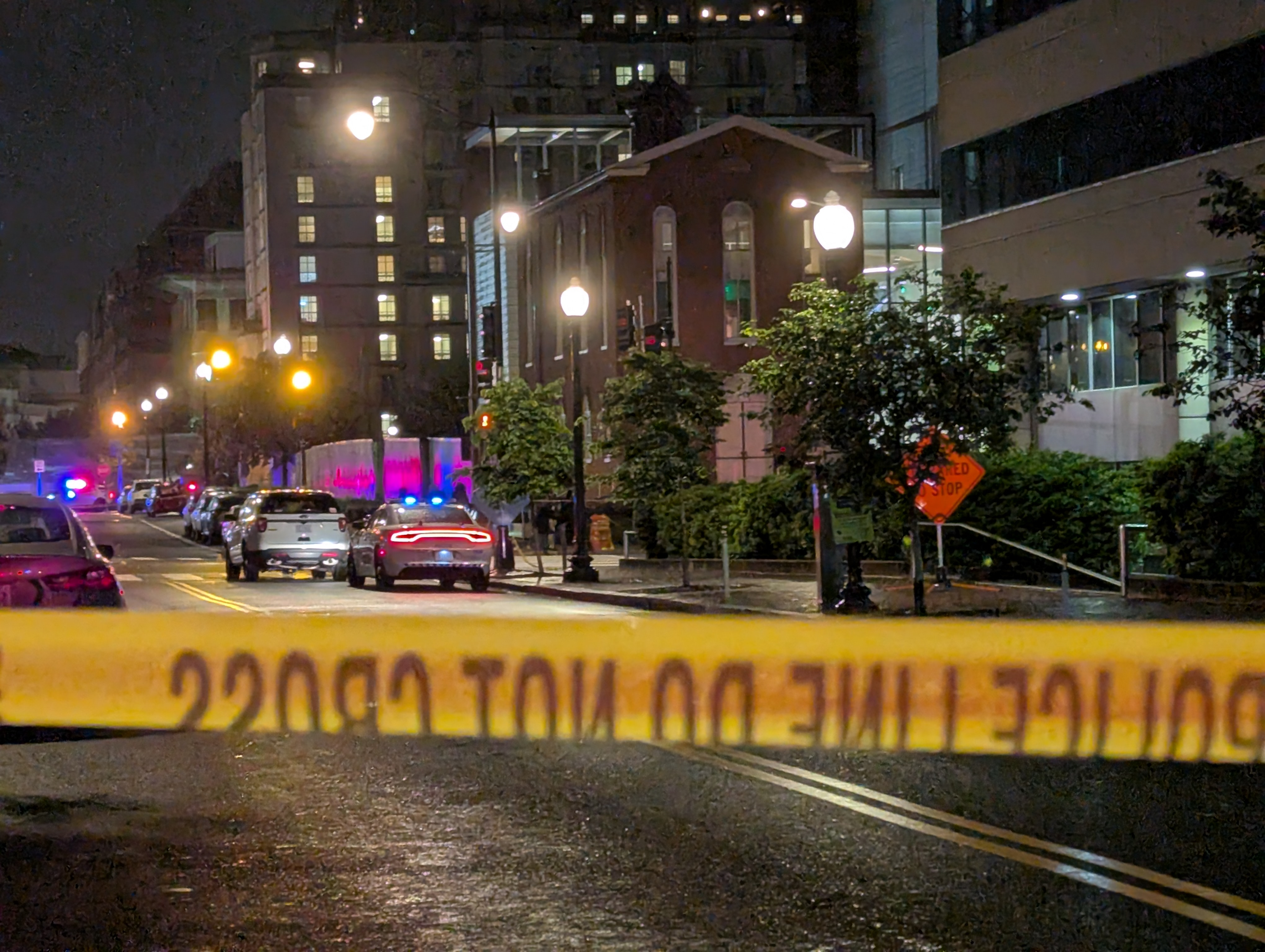
Police tape cordons off the museum shortly after the shooting

On May 21, 2025, two staff members of the Embassy of Israel, 30-year-old German-Israeli Yaron Lischinsky and his 26-year old American Jewish girlfriend Sarah Lynn Milgrim, were shot in the back 21 times at close range and killed outside the museum as they were leaving an event hosted by the American Jewish Committee. The two victims were a young couple soon to be engaged.

31-year-old Elias Rodriguez was arrested as the suspect after being apprehended by event security. He pulled out a red Palestinian-style keffiyeh and chanted "free, free Palestine!" as he was taken into custody.

Danny Danon, the Israeli ambassador to the United Nations, called it a "depraved act of anti-Semitic terrorism".

U.S. President Donald Trump condemned the killings via a post on Truth Social, stating: "These horrible DC killings, based obviously on antisemitism, must end, NOW!"

== See also ==
- National Museum of American Jewish Military History
- National Register of Historic Places listings in central Washington, D.C.
