= 1988 Nicosia Israeli Embassy bombing =

1988 terrorist attack

- Location: Nicosia, Cyprus
- Date: 11 May 1988
- Attack type: Car bombing
- Deaths: 2 (+1 attacker)
- Injuries: 19
- Perpetrator: Abu Nidal Organization

On 11 May 1988, the Israeli Embassy in Nicosia, Cyprus was targeted by a car bomb. The botched attack killed three people and wounded 19 others.

== Attack ==
The bombing took place after a car loaded with 300 pounds of dynamite blew up about 200 yards from the Israeli Embassy after the police prevented the driver from parking at the embassy building. The car's driver and two Cypriots were killed in the explosion. Responsibility was claimed by the Abu Nidal Organization.

The driver of the car had tried twice to park outside the four-story embassy but was told by the police that he had to move. When they asked for his identification, he sped away, but collided with another car at an intersection and the dynamite exploded. The car was blown apart by the explosion, while four other vehicles were set afire. Windows of buildings in the area including the embassy's were blown out in the explosion.

According to the Cyprus Interior Minister Christodoulos Veniamin, it was "clear the embassy was the intended target of the car bomb." Israeli Defense Minister Yitzhak Rabin called it another ″terror attempt against Israel, Israelis, Israeli representation outside the region. Terror has become part of our life.″ The Israeli Embassy in Nicosia had previously been bombed twice, in 1979 and in 1984, causing no casualties.

== See also ==
- List of attacks against Israeli embassies and diplomats
