= 1999 attack on the Israeli consulate in Berlin =

Terrorist incident in Germany

Attack on the Israeli consulate in Berlin
- Part of the Kurdish–Turkish conflict
- Date: 17 February 1999; 27 years ago
- Location: Israeli consulate, Berlin, Germany; 52°29′00″N 13°17′20″E
- Type: Protests, vandalism, attempted raid
- Motive: Revenge for alleged Mossad involvement in the capture of Abdullah Öcalan
- Organised by: PKK supporters
- Outcome: See Aftermath
- Deaths: 3
- Injuries: 14

The attack on the Israeli consulate in Berlin was perpetrated by PKK supporters on the Israeli consulate in Berlin, Germany, on 17 February 1999. Three people were killed and 14 were injured after security forces at the consulate opened fire on the PKK supporters.

== Background ==
In October 1998 Abdullah Öcalan, leader of the PKK, was forced to leave Syria for Moscow, Russia, where he was not allowed to stay, before flying to Rome, Italy. The Italian government did not want to allow Öcalan to stay, however they were legally not permitted to extradite him to Turkey, where he could face the death penalty. After being denied entrance to Germany, the Netherlands and France, Öcalan went to Greece on 1 February 1999. He was captured on 15 February 1999, while being transferred from the Greek embassy to Jomo Kenyatta International Airport in Nairobi, in an operation by the Millî İstihbarat Teşkilâtı, with alleged help from the CIA and Mossad.

== Attack ==
Worldwide protests broke out after the news of Öcalan's capture, which took place in Kenya by Turkish intelligence, with cooperation of Greece. According to the German police, up to 20 PKK supporters stood in front of the Israeli consulate in Berlin on 17 February, accusing the Mossad of allegedly helping the Turkish government in kidnapping Öcalan. When the protesters managed to break through police ranks and enter the consulate building, Israeli security opened fire on the attackers, killing three and injuring 14. Later, German police arrested 30 PKK supporters and cordoned off all area as helicopters circled over the consulate building.

== Aftermath ==
In the immediate aftermath, Benjamin Netanyahu defended the actions of the security guards, saying that protesters had attempted to take a weapon from them. Israel increased the amount of guards deployed in all its missions abroad.

== See also ==
- List of attacks against Israeli embassies and diplomats
