= Aryeh Bahir =

Israeli politician

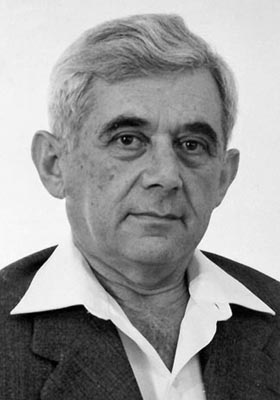

Faction represented in the Knesset
- 1949–1951: Mapai
- 1955–1959: Mapai
- 1967–1968: Rafi
- 1968–1969: Labor Party
- 1969: Alignment

Personal details
- Born: 1 May 1906 Odessa, Russian Empire
- Died: 13 September 1970 (aged 64)

Aryeh Bahir (Hebrew: אריה בהיר; 1 May 1906 – 13 September 1970) was an Israeli politician who served a member of the Knesset for Mapai, Rafi, the Labor Party and the Alignment between the late 1940s and late 1960s.

== Biography ==
Born Aryeh Geller in Odessa in the Russian Empire (today in Ukraine), Bahir studied at the Hebrew Gymnasium and Polytechnic in his home city and was a member of Hashomer Hatzair. He emigrated to Mandatory Palestine in 1924 and was one of the founders of kibbutz Afikim in 1932. He was an activist for the HaKibbutz HaMeuhad movement, and also served on the board of directors of Solel Boneh construction company.

A leader of the Netzah (Youth Pioneers) faction of Hashomer Hatzair, Bahir later joined Mapai. He was placed fortieth on the Mapai list for the 1949 Constituent Assembly elections, and was elected as Mapai won 46 seats. For the 1951 elections he was placed sixty-third on the party's list, and lost his seat. However, he returned to the Knesset in the 1955 elections after being placed thirty-fourth on the party's list. He lost his seat again in 1959 elections after being placed fifty-ninth on the party's list. He was sixth-fourth on the party's list for the 1961 elections, again failing to be elected.

In 1965 he joined Ben-Gurion's new Rafi party, and was twelfth on its list for the elections that year. Although the party won only ten seats, he entered the Knesset on 20 February 1967 as a replacement for Yizhar Smilansky. During his third term, Rafi merged into the Labor Party, which then became the Alignment. He was eighty-fifth on the Alignment list for the 1969 elections, losing his seat as the alliance won 56 seats. He died the following year.
