= Ometz (political party) =

Ometz אומץ
- Leader: Yigal Hurvitz
- Founded: 26 January 1981 (Rafi - National List); 6 June 1983 (Rafi)
- Dissolved: 1981 (National List); 1988 (Ometz)
- Split from: Likud (Rafi-National List); Telem (Rafi)
- Merged into: Likud and Telem (1981); Likud (1988)
- Most MKs: 3 (1981)
- Fewest MKs: 1 (1981, 1983–1987)

Election symbol
- יש

Ometz (Hebrew: אומץ, Courage), originally Rafi – National List (Hebrew: רפ"י – רשימה ממלכתית, Rafi – Reshima Mamlakhtit), then the National List (Hebrew: רשימה ממלכתית, Reshima Mamlakhtit) was a small right-wing political party in Israel, which existed briefly in 1981, and then from 1983 until 1987. Though linked to it, it is considered a separate entity to the National List of the early 1970s.

== Background ==
Rafi – National List was founded when three MKs, Yigal Hurvitz, Yitzhak Peretz and Zalman Shoval, broke away from Likud in January 1981, during the ninth Knesset, Hurvitz and Shoval having previously been members of the National List. However, three months later Hurvitz and Shoval left to join Telem, and the party was renamed National List. It folded when Peretz rejoined Likud in June, shortly before the 30 June elections.

The party was refounded as Rafi – National List by Hurvitz in 1983 during the tenth Knesset after Telem split in two (the other outcome was the Movement for the Renewal of Social Zionism). Prior to the 1984 elections the party was renamed Ometz.

The party only won one seat in the elections, taken by Hurvitz. Despite its small size, the party was invited to Shimon Peres and Yitzhak Shamir's national unity government alongside the National Religious Party, Agudat Israel, Shas, Morasha, and Shinui.

On 27 August 1988, the party merged into Likud and ceased to exist.

== Knesset Members ==
Knesset (MKs)	Knesset Members
9th (3 −2)	Yitzhak Peretz − Yigal Hurvitz, Zalman Shoval (to Telem)
10th (1)	Yigal Hurvitz
11th (1)	Yigal Hurvitz
