= Yechiel Leiter =

Israeli historian and analyst and Israeli ambassador to the US

- יחיאל לייטר
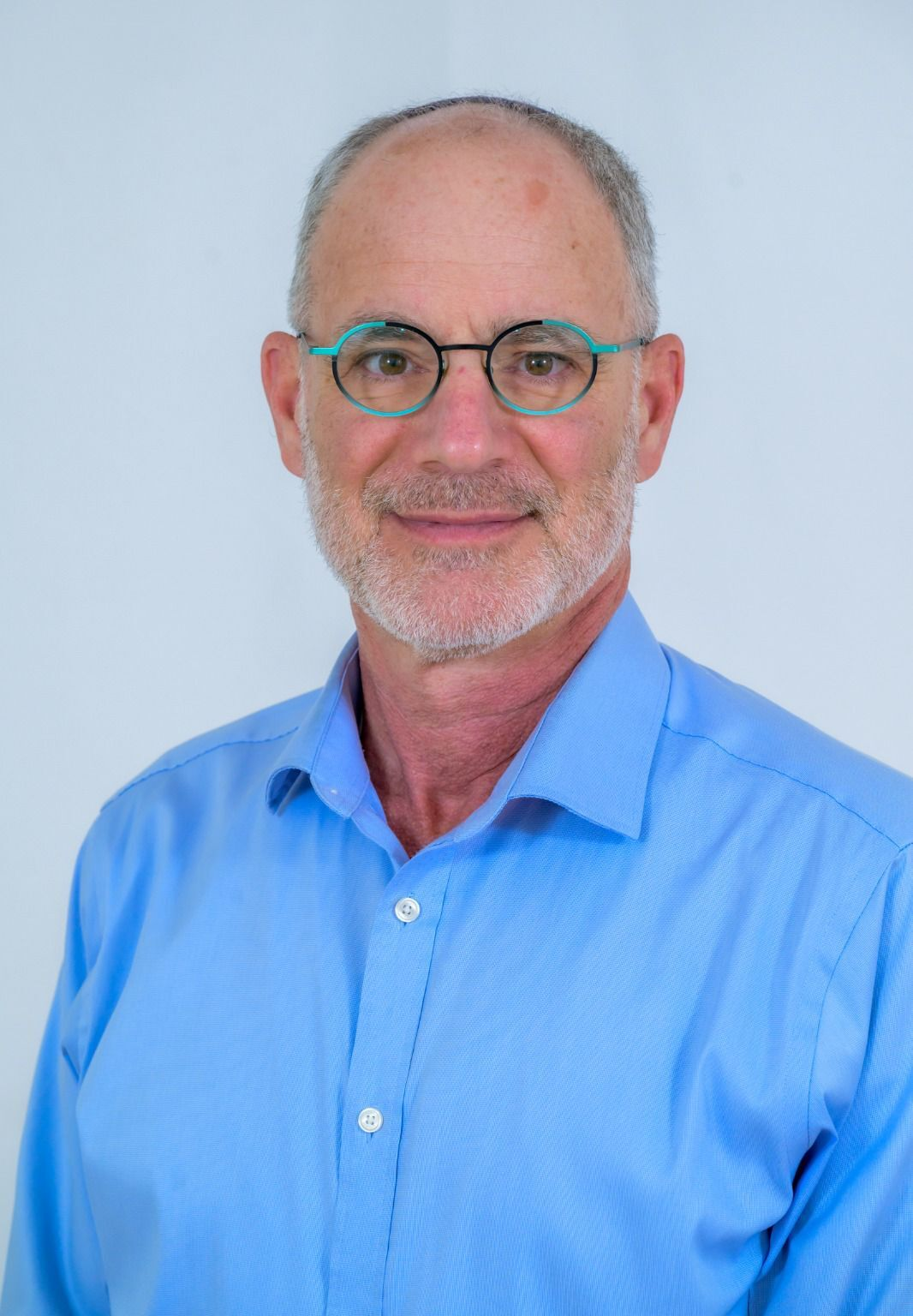
- Leiter in 2023

Israeli Ambassador to the United States
- Incumbent
- Assumed office January 27, 2025
- Prime Minister: Benjamin Netanyahu
- Preceded by: Michael Herzog

Personal details
- Born: October 1, 1959 (age 67) Scranton, Pennsylvania, U.S.
- Citizenship: United States • Israel
- Party: Likud
- Relations: Chani Leiter
- Children: 8 (1 Deceased)
- Education: University of Haifa

Yechiel "Michael" Leiter (Hebrew: יחיאל לייטר; born October 1, 1959) is an American-born Israeli historian of philosophy, public policy analyst, rabbi and settlement activist. He is a resident scholar at the Herzl Institute in Jerusalem. On January 27, 2025, he assumed the position of Israeli ambassador to the United States. He previously served as chief of staff to Benjamin Netanyahu at the Israeli Ministry of Finance and as political assistant to Ariel Sharon in the Israeli parliament. An ordained rabbi, Leiter has written three books and numerous essays on the politics of the Middle East. He is affiliated with the Kohelet Policy Forum.

== Early life and education ==
Yechiel Leiter was born on 1 October 1959 in Scranton, Pennsylvania. He studied for two years at Yeshivas Chofetz Chaim in Queens, New York.

He immigrated to Israel in 1978 at the age of eighteen, where he studied at Yeshivat Hesder in Kiryat Arba in advance of his military service. He served as a combat medic in the Israel Defense Forces and participated in the 1982 Lebanon War. He served as chairman of the Committee of the Jewish Community of Hebron from 1989 to 1992, and later lived in the settlement of Alon Shvut.

Leiter holds an undergraduate degree in law, a Bachelor of Arts in political science, a Master of Arts in international relations, and a PhD in political philosophy from the University of Haifa. His doctoral thesis focuses on the influence of the Hebrew Bible on John Locke's theory of consensual government. He received semikhah as a rabbi in 1984.

== Career ==
Leiter served as a political advisor to Knesset member Ariel Sharon and in multiple senior government positions: first as deputy director general of the Israeli Ministry of Education, where he helped plan a major overhaul of the educational system, and then as chief of staff to Benjamin Netanyahu in the Ministry of Finance, where he took an active role in economic reforms.

Leiter subsequently became a senior policy analyst at the Jerusalem Center for Public Affairs, where he directed and edited a geopolitical blog. In that capacity, he was a frequent guest on Israeli news programs and a contributor to such Israeli media outlets such as YNet, Maariv-NRG, and Yisrael Hayom.

In 2008, Leiter ran unsuccessfully as a candidate for election to the Knesset in the Likud Party's primaries.

He has served as the chief executive officer of 3H Global, an international consultancy group specializing in aiding governments to formulate and implement policy.

In 2010, Leiter was a candidate for the position of Chairman of Israel Broadcasting Authority.

He served as the advisor and chief strategist of Horacio Cartes, President of Paraguay. In 2015, Leiter founded Versta. Between 2015-2023, he was the director of The Jerusalem Center for Public Affairs, initiated the Red Sea dialogue with Ethiopia's Ministry of Foreign Affairs, was a researcher in the Shilo Forum, and led initiatives to combat BDS. He was also the strategic advisor for the Presidential race in Liberia which resulted in the candidate's victory.

In 2011, he was elected chairman of Israel Port Authority, where he was responsible for the planning of Israel's seaport operations and the building of two new deep-water ports in Ashdod and Haifa.

Leiter taught political philosophy in the law faculty at the Ono Academic College in Kiryat Ono. He is strategic advisor to the Foundation for the Archaeological Exploration, Restoration and Expansion of Ancient Shiloh.

Leiter has served as a member of the board of governors of the University of Judea and Samaria in Ariel and as a director on the National Committee for the Perpetuation of the Memory of Theodor Herzl. He serves on the board of directors of The Israel Experience, a subsidiary of the Jewish Agency for Israel, which manages the "Taglit-Birthright" program in Israel.

Leiter is a senior fellow at the Kohelet Policy Forum.

=== 20th Ambassador of Israel to the United States ===
In January 2025, Leiter became the 20th Israeli ambassador to the United States, assuming the position following the departure of Michael Herzog from that role.

After the Capital Jewish Museum shooting in May 2025, in which two Israeli Embassy staffers were shot dead by a perpetrator who shouted "Free, free, Palestine" after being detained in police custody, Leiter described the murders as the eighth front in Israel's war, what he called "The war to demonize, delegitimize and to eradicate the right of the state of Israel to exist".

== Personal life ==
He moved in 1992 to Eli, a settlement in the West Bank, with his wife and their eight children. In recent years he has lived in Alon Shvut. His son, Major (Res.) Moshe Yedidia Leiter, a medical student, served as a platoon commander in the Shaldag Unit and was killed in the northern Gaza Strip in 2023. A second son, Neria, an IDF reservist, was seriously injured in a vehicle ramming attack at a checkpoint in The West Bank on 23 September 2026.

Leiter has authored three books and dozens of articles on Zionism and Israeli politics and has lectured extensively to audiences throughout the United States, Canada, England, Australia, South Africa, and South America.

== Bibliography ==
- Aloh Naaleh - 'The Aliyah Imperative' (1988), in Hebrew
- A Peace to Resist: Why the Rabin-Arafat Deal Must Be Stopped, and How It Can Be Done (1993)
- Crisis in Israel (1994)
- Israel at the cross-roads: The view from the hills of Judea and Samaria (1999)
- Between Despair and Hope: Public Perceptions of Educational Reform (2005)
- Political Views from Above (2008), in Hebrew
- The Political Hebraism of John Locke: A New-Old Reading of the Two Treatises of Government (2008)
- John Locke's Political Philosophy and the Hebrew Bible, 2018, Cambridge University Press
