= Telem (1981 political party) =

Israeli political party

Telem תל״ם
- Leader: Moshe Dayan (1981); Mordechai Ben-Porat (1981–83)
- Founded: 1981
- Dissolved: 1983
- Succeeded by: Movement for the Renewal of Social Zionism; Rafi–National List
- Ideology: Zionism; Centrism
- Colours: Blue; Brown
- Most MKs: 4 (1977)

Election symbol
- כן

Telem (Hebrew: תל״ם, an abbreviation for Tnu'a LeHithadshut Mamlakhtit (Hebrew: תנועה להתחדשות ממלכתית, lit. 'Movement for National Renewal') was a political party in Israel.

== Background ==
Telem was formed on 19 May 1981 during the ninth Knesset by Moshe Dayan and two ex-Likud MKs. Dayan had been elected to the Knesset as an MK for the Alignment, which had lost the election for the first time in its history. Menachem Begin formed a coalition including his Likud party, the National Religious Party, Agudat Israel, and Dash. However, he also invited Dayan to serve as Minister of Foreign Affairs. Despite being a member of the Alignment, Begin's political rival, Dayan accepted the post, resulting in his expulsion from his own party.

After sitting as an independent MK for some time, Dayan formed Telem in 1981, together with Yigal Hurvitz and Zalman Shoval, who had previously broken away from Likud to form Rafi – National List. On 15 June 1981, they were joined by Shafik Assad, who had left Ahva (Assad had started the Knesset session as a member of Dash, then joined the Democratic Movement before moving to Ahva).

The party won two seats in the 1981 elections, taken by Dayan and Mordechai Ben-Porat, and was invited to join the governing coalition, with Ben-Porat becoming Minister Without Portfolio. When Dayan died on 16 October 1981, he was replaced by Hurvitz. However, the party split up on 6 June 1983, when Ben-Porat created the Movement for the Renewal of Social Zionism and Hurvitz reformed Rafi – National List, which he later renamed Ometz.

A new party by the name of Telem was formed by ex-Shas MK Yosef Azran in the mid-1990s to fight the 1996 elections. However, it failed to cross the electoral threshold, and subsequently disappeared.

In 2019 a party founded by Moshe Ya'alon was named Telem in honour of the original Telem.

== Leaders ==
Leader		Took office	Left office
1	Moshe Dayan	1981	1981
2	Mordechai Ben-Porat	1981	1983

== Election results ==
Election	Leader	Votes	%	Position	Seats	Outcome
1981	Moshe Dayan	30,600	1.58	▲8th	2 / 120	Coalition

== List of Knesset members ==
Name	Years in office	Government roles	Other roles
Shafik Assad	1981		
Mordechai Ben-Porat	1981–1983	Minister without Portfolio	Party leader 1981–1983
Moshe Dayan	1981		Party leader 1981
Yigal Hurvitz	1981,1981–1983		
