= List of ambassadors of Israel to the United States =

Ambassador of Israel to the United States of America
- שגריר ישראל בארצות הברית
- Emblem of Israel

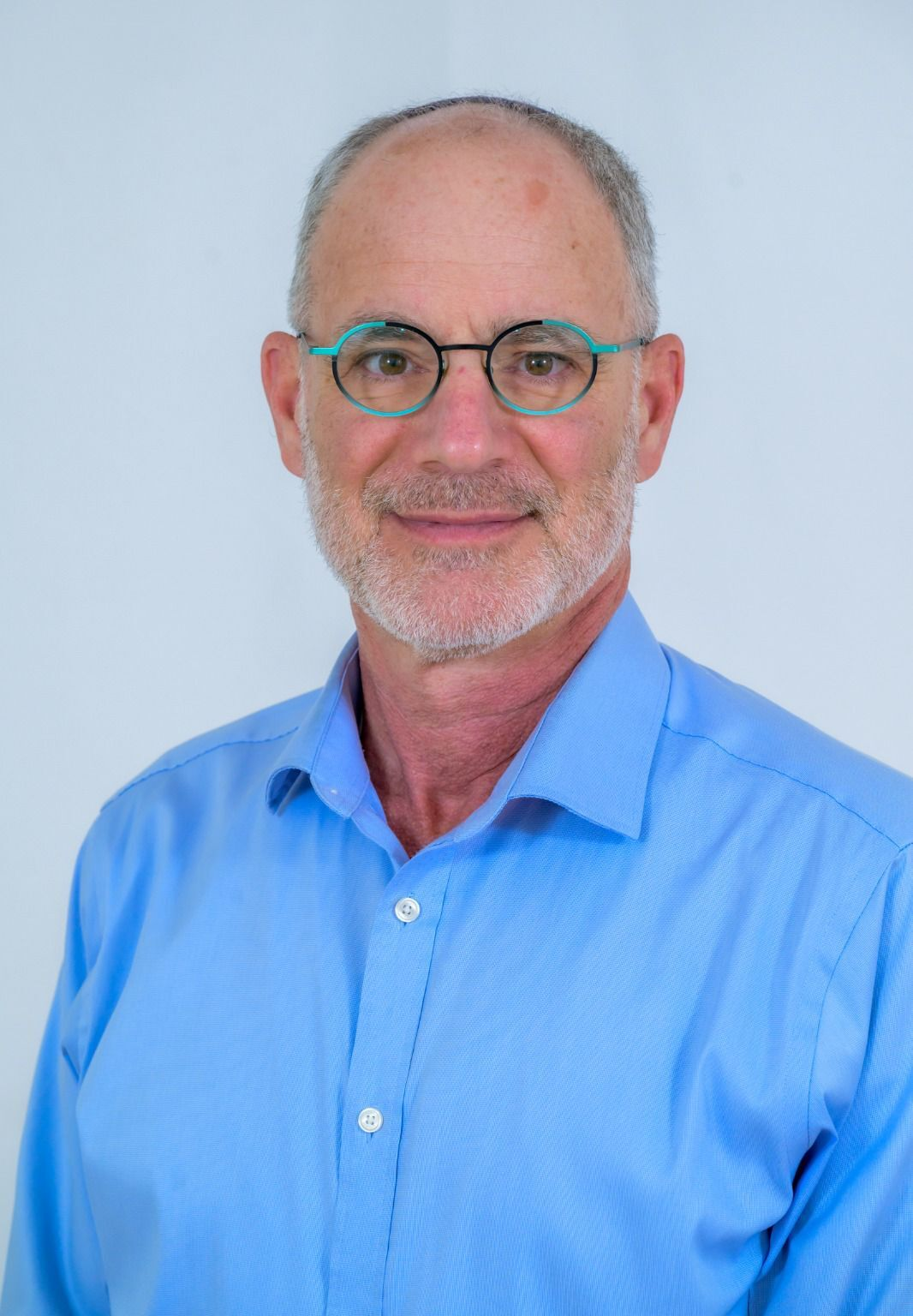
- Incumbent; Yechiel Leiter since 27 January 2025
- Residence: Embassy of Israel, Washington, D.C.
- Appointer: Cabinet of Israel
- Inaugural holder: Eliahu Eilat as Ambassador Extraordinary and Plenipotentiary
- Formation: 25 February 1949; 77 years ago
- Website: new.embassies.gov.il/usa/en

The Ambassador Extraordinary and Plenipotentiary of Israel to the United States of America (Hebrew: השגריר יוצא הדופן והבכיר של ישראל בארצות הברית של אמריקה, romanized: Hashagrir Yotzei Hadofen Vehabakhir Shel Yisrael BeArtsot HaBrit Shel Amerika) is the ambassador of the State of Israel to the United States.

It is generally regarded as the most prestigious position in the Israeli Ministry of Foreign Affairs due to the close diplomatic and military relationship between the two countries. The ambassador and the embassy staff at large work at the Israeli Embassy in Washington, D.C.

On 25 February 1949, Eliahu Eilat was appointed as the first ambassador to the U.S. Since he left the position, 21 individuals have been appointed as ambassadors to the U.S. The longest-serving ambassador is Abba Eban, who represented Israel from 28 May 1950 to the summer of 1959, while the shortest tenure as an ambassador is held by Gilad Erdan, who served from 27 June 2021 to 5 September 2021. The incumbent ambassador is Yechiel Leiter, who was appointed by the 37th government of Israel on 24 January 2025. Including Leiter, four ambassadors have been American citizens: Arens was a naturalized citizen, while Oren, Dermer, and Leiter were born in the U.S.

== List ==
Israeli diplomatic representatives to the United States
Name (in Hebrew) (Note: Hebrew names, read from right to left, link to the Hebrew Wikipedia articles for each ambassador.)	Photo	Tenure			Refs.
Name (in Hebrew)	Photo	Start	End	Length (year range)	Refs.
Eliahu Eilat (אליהו אילת)		25 February 1949	1950	1–2	REF
Abba Eban (Note: Also served concurrently as Israel's ambassador to the United Nations) (אבא אבן)		28 May 1950	May 1959	8–9	REF
Avraham Harman (אברהם הרמן)		May 1959	February 1968	8–9	REF
Yitzhak Rabin (יצחק רבין)		February 1968	March 1973	4–5	REF
Simcha Dinitz (שמחה דיניץ)		March 1973	1979	5–6	REF
Ephraim Evron (אפרים עברון)		1979	1982	2–3	REF
Moshe Arens (משה ארנס)		1982	1983	0–1	REF
Meir Rosenne (מאיר רוזן)		1983	1987	3–4	REF
Moshe Arad (משה ארד)		1987	1990	2–3	REF
Zalman Shoval (זלמן שובל)		1990	1993	2–3	REF
Itamar Rabinovich (איתמר רבינוביץ)		1993	1996	2–3	REF
Eliahu Ben-Elissar (אליהו בן-אלישר)		1996	1998	1–2	REF
Zalman Shoval (זלמן שובל)		1998	1999	0–1	REF
David Ivry (דוד עברי)		1999	2002	2–3	REF
Daniel Ayalon (דני אילון)		4 October 2002	4 October 2006	3–4	REF
Sallai Meridor (סלי מרידור)		22 October 2006	2009	2–3	REF
Michael Oren (מייקל אורן)		2009	2013	3–4	REF
Ron Dermer (רון דרמר)		28 July 2013	2021	7–8	REF
Gilad Erdan (גלעד ארדן)		2021	2021	0	REF
Michael Herzog (מיכאל הרצוג)		5 September 2021	24 January 2025	3–4	REF
Yechiel Leiter (יחיאל לייטר)		27 January 2025	present	0–1	REF

== See also ==
- Israel–United States relations
- List of Israeli ambassadors
- List of ambassadors of the United States to Israel
- List of consuls general of Israel to the United States
