= Yigal Hurvitz =

Israeli politician

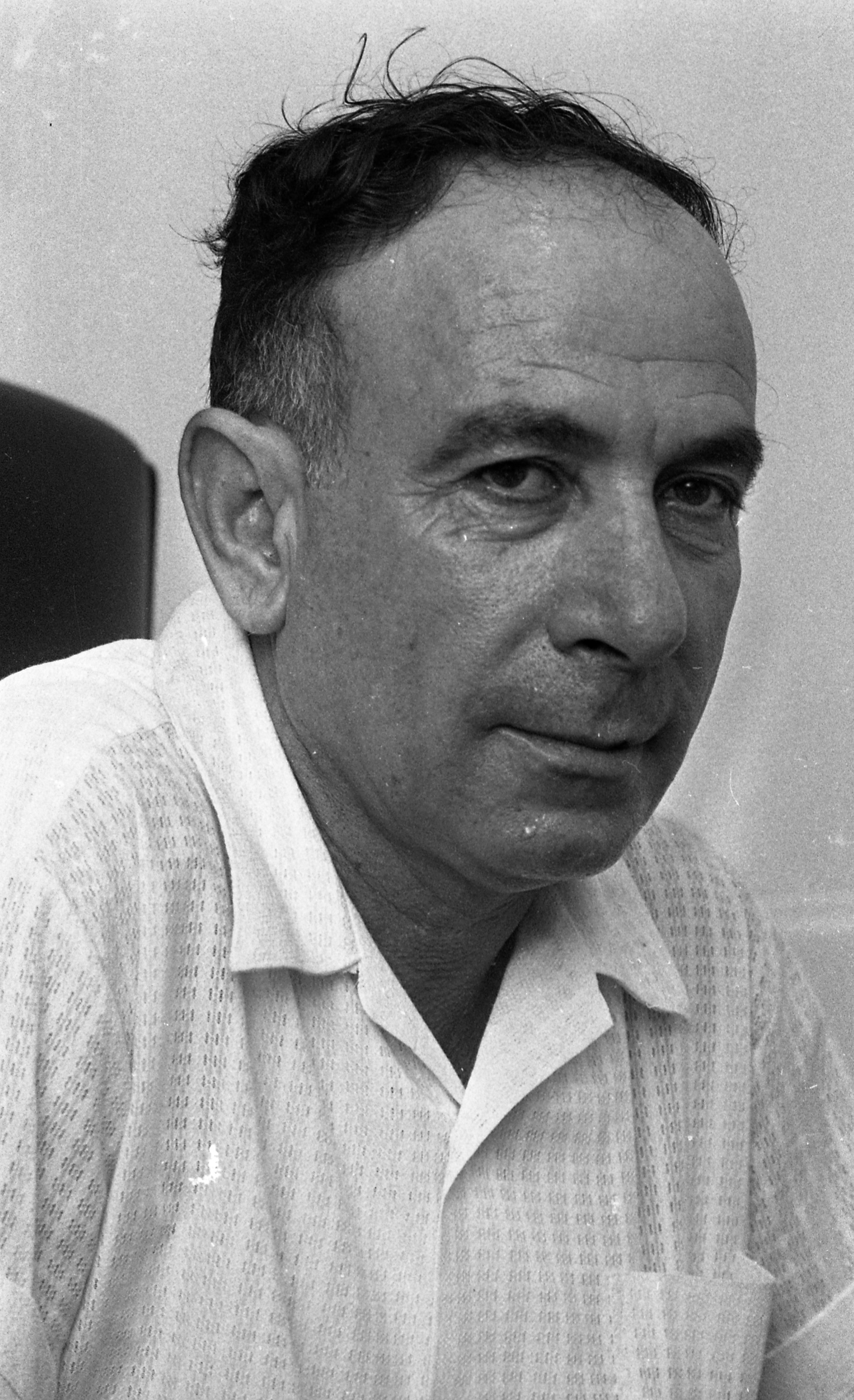
- Hurvitz in 1969

Ministerial roles
- 1977–1978: Minister of Industry, Trade & Tourism
- 1979–1981: Minister of Finance
- 1984–1988: Minister without Portfolio

Faction represented in the Knesset
- 1969–1974: National List
- 1974–1981: Likud
- 1981: Rafi
- 1981: Telem
- 1981–1983: Telem
- 1983–1988: Ometz
- 1988–1992: Likud

Personal details
- Born: 15 October 1918 Nahlat Yehuda, Palestine
- Died: 10 January 1994 (aged 75)

Yigal Hurvitz (Hebrew: יגאל הורביץ; 15 October 1918 – 10 January 1994) was an Israeli farmer, businessman and politician who served as a government minister in the late 1970s and 1980s.

== Biography ==
Hurvitz was born in Nahlat Yehuda (today part of Rishon LeZion) in 1918, but grew up in the rural village of Nahalal. Between 1938 and 1941 he was a member of the secretariat of HaNoar HaOved VeHaLomed. During World War II he enlisted in the British Army and served in the Jewish Brigade. After the war he purchased a dairy and poultry farm in Kfar Warburg. He subsequently owned factories making ice cream and plastic cups. In 1961 he joined Mapai and became a member of the party's central committee. He also served as a member of the Moshavim Movement's secretariat between 1961 and 1965.

In 1965 he joined David Ben-Gurion's new Rafi party alongside his brother Amos, and followed Ben-Gurion to the new National List in 1969, whilst Amos remained in Rafi. In that year he was elected to the Knesset on the party's list. Following its merger into the new Likud alliance in 1973, Hurvitz was re-elected on Likud's list. He was re-elected in 1977, and was appointed Minister of Industry & Tourism, a role he held until October 1978, when he resigned in protest at the government's signing of the Camp David Accords. In November 1979 he was appointed Minister of Finance, but left the cabinet again on 13 January 1981. On 26 January he and two other Likud MKs broke away from the Likud to form Rafi – National List. On 19 May he left the new faction to join Moshe Dayan's Telem.

After being placed third on Telem's list, he lost his seat in the 1981 elections when the party won only two seats. However, following Dayan's death in October 1981, Hurvitz re-entered the Knesset as his replacement. In June 1983 he left Telem and re-formed Rafi – National List. Shortly before the 1984 elections he renamed it Ometz (lit. Courage).

Although the party won only a single seat in the elections (taken by Hurvitz), it joined the national unity government and Hurvitz was appointed Minister without Portfolio, a role he held until 1988. In 1987 he rejoined Likud. He won re-election on Likud's list in the 1988 elections, but lost his seat in 1992. He died two years later.
