= Embassy of Israel, Washington, D.C. =

Diplomatic mission of the State of Israel in the United States

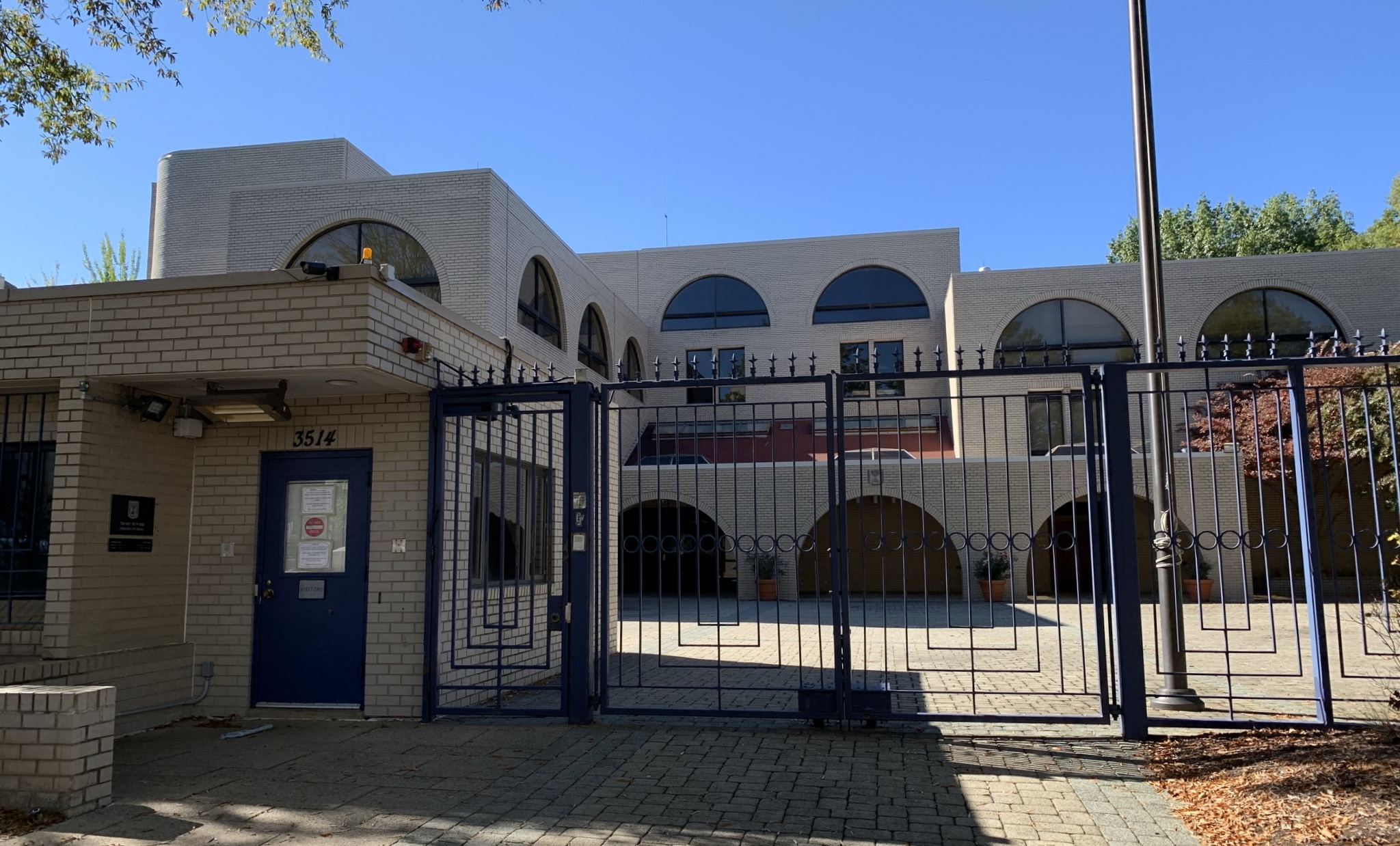
- Location: Washington, D.C.
- Address: 3514 International Drive, N.W.
- Coordinates: 38°56′33.8″N 77°4′6.3″W
- Opening: December 1980
- Ambassador: Yechiel Leiter
- Website: https://embassies.gov.il/washington/Pages/default.aspx

The Embassy of Israel in Washington, D.C. is the diplomatic mission of the State of Israel to the United States. It is located at 3514 International Drive, Washington, D.C., in the North Cleveland Park neighborhood.

== History ==
The embassy opened in December 1980, after Israel's 1977 request to move to the Embassy Row during the then-Israeli prime minister Menachem Begin's first visit to Washington, D.C. On another visit to the city, Begin performed the Jewish ritual of hanging a mezuzah by the embassy's front door.

The Ambassador is Yechiel Leiter. In addition to the ambassador, the embassy includes 13 departments that seek to strengthen the relationship between the United States and Israel. These departments include the Defense and Armed Forces Attache, the Political Department, Congressional Affairs, Public Diplomacy, Defense and Armed Forces, Economic Mission, Commercial Mission, the Minister for Administrative Affairs and Consul, Police and Security, Academic Affairs, Cultural Affairs, Press Office, and Agriculture and Science.

The embassy hosts numerous events for politicians and the general public throughout the year, including a celebration for Yom Ha'atzmaut, Israel's Independence Day.

On February 25, 2024, Aaron Bushnell, a 25-year-old serviceman of the United States Air Force, died after setting himself on fire, while live streaming the event, outside the front gate of the Embassy in protest of the Gaza genocide and United States support for Israel in the Gaza war.

On May 21, 2025, two staff members were killed in a shooting at the Capital Jewish Museum. The suspected shooter chanted pro-Palestinian slogans after the shooting.
