= Rafi (political party) =

Israeli Workers List רשימת פועלי ישראל
- Chairman: David Ben-Gurion
- Founded: 14 July 1965
- Dissolved: 23 January 1968
- Split from: Mapai
- Merged into: Israeli Labor Party
- Headquarters: Tel Aviv, Israel
- Ideology: Labor Zionism; Social democracy
- Political position: Centre-left
- Colours: Blue
- Most MKs: 10 (1965)

Election symbol
- כא

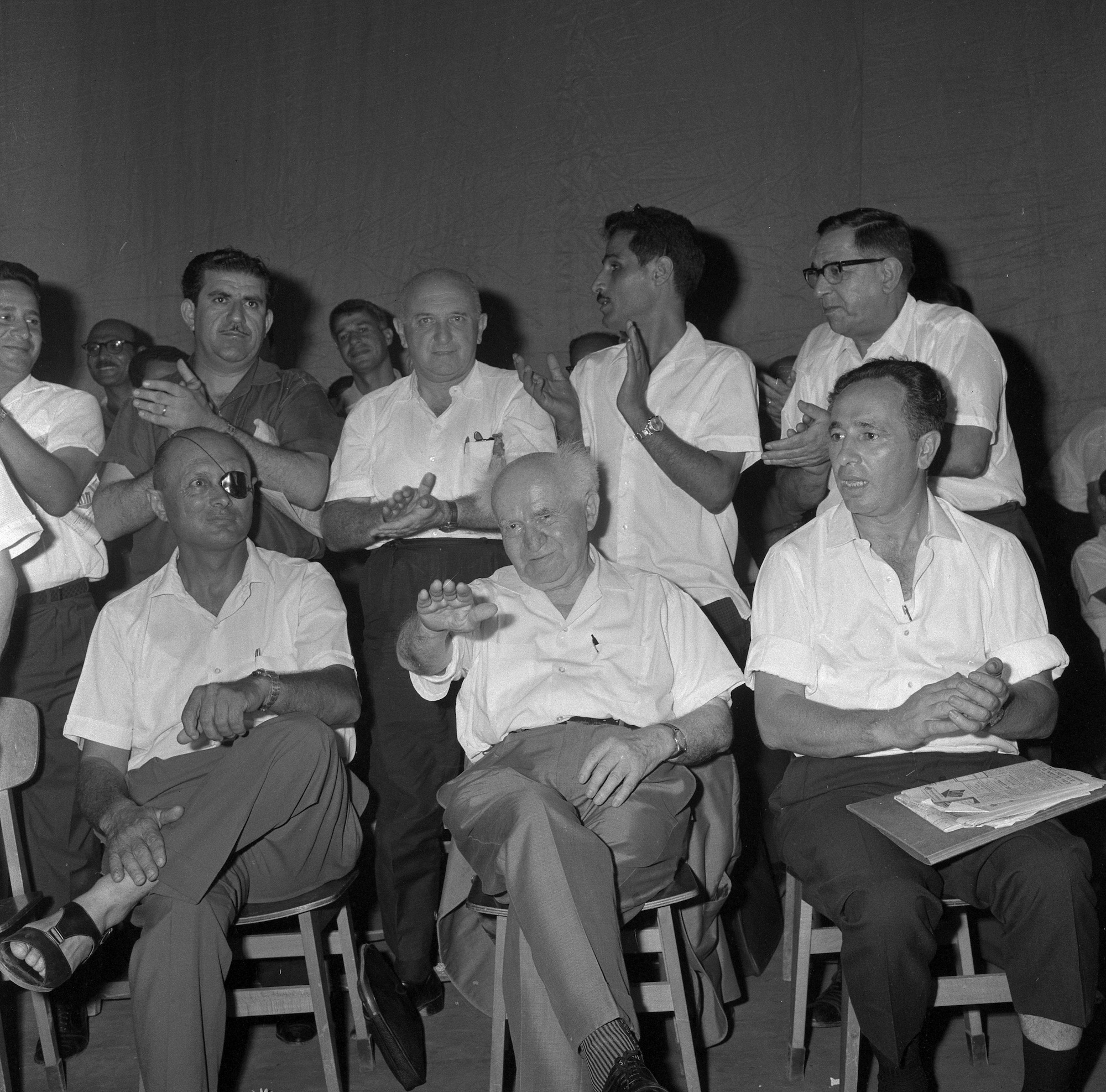
Moshe Dayan, David Ben-Gurion and Shimon Peres at the founding conference of Rafi in 1966

Rafi (Hebrew: רַפִ״י, an abbreviation of Reshimat Poalei Yisrael (Hebrew: רְשִׁימָת פּוֹעַלֵי יִשְׂרָאֵל), lit. 'Israeli Workers List') was a center-left political party in Israel, founded by former prime minister David Ben-Gurion in 1965. In 1968 it was one of three parties that merged to form the Israeli Labor Party.

== History ==
Rafi was founded on 14 July 1965 when David Ben-Gurion led a breakaway of eight MKs from Mapai, the ruling party, taking with him Moshe Dayan, Shimon Peres, Chaim Herzog, and Teddy Kollek, among others. The split had two main causes; the first was the disagreements within Mapai over the Lavon Affair; Ben-Gurion did not agree to declaring Lavon innocent without judicial investigation committee. The second was the formation of the Labor Alignment by an alliance of Mapai and Ahdut HaAvoda. The new party's establishment, a merger of two of the largest left-wing parties, was intended to delay planned reforms to the electoral system (i.e. to change from proportional representation to a constituency-based system) that were important to Ben-Gurion.

The party ran for the 1965 elections on a platform of changing the electoral systems. Although Ben-Gurion hoped to displace the Labour Alignment as the leading left-wing party in the Knesset, Rafi won only 10 seats. In early 1967, Rafi and Menachem Begin's Gahal party discussed the idea of forming a center-right coalition to challenge Mapai. The party was not included in Levi Eshkol's coalition government until the formation of the government of national unity (in which Dayan replaced Eshkol as defense minister), on the day the Six-Day War started; the right wing Gahal alliance also joined the government 5 June.

On 23 January 1968 the party merged with Ahdut HaAvoda and Mapai to form the Israeli Labor Party and ceased to exist as an independent entity. However, Ben-Gurion could not reconcile himself to the merger with his foes, and broke away from the party to sit as an independent MK for the rest of the Knesset session. Prior to the 1969 elections, he founded another new party, the National List. However, after Ben-Gurion retired from politics in 1970 it fell apart, eventually merging with the Free Centre and Gahal to form Likud.

The name Rafi was briefly resurrected during the ninth Knesset and again during the tenth Knesset when breakaways from Likud named themselves Rafi – National List. The party was later renamed Ometz.

== Election results ==
Election	Votes	%	Seats	+/–	Leader
1965	95,328 (#4)	7.9	10 / 120	New	David Ben-Gurion

== Knesset Members ==
Knesset (MKs)	Knesset Members
5th (8)	Yosef Almogi, David Ben-Gurion, Gideon Ben-Israel, Moshe Dayan, Amos Degani, Hannah Lamdan, Shimon Peres, Yizhar Smilansky
6th (10)	Yosef Almogi, David Ben-Gurion, Mordechai Ben-Porat, Moshe Dayan, Mathilda Guez, Yitzhak Navon, Shimon Peres, Yizhar Smilansky (replaced by Amos Degani), Mordechai Surkis, Tzvi Tzur (replaced by Aryeh Bahir)
