= Provisional State Council =

Provisional State Council מועצת המדינה הזמנית Moetzet HaMedina HaZmanit

Type
- Type: Unicameral

History
- Founded: 12 April 1948
- Disbanded: 3 February 1949
- Succeeded by: Knesset

Leadership
- Council President: Chaim Weizmann (1948–1949), General Zionists
- Council Speaker: Yosef Sprinzak, Mapai
- Prime Minister: David Ben-Gurion, Mapai

Structure
- Seats: 37
- Political groups: Provisional government (30): Mapai (10); Mapam (3); General Zionists (3); New Aliyah (3); Mizrachi (3); Hapoel HaMizrachi (2); Agudat Yisrael (2); Sephardim and Oriental Communities (1); Ahdut HaAvoda-Poalei Tzion (1); Poale Zion Left (1); Independent (1); Opposition (7): Hatzohar (3); Poalei Agudat Yisrael (1); Maki (1); WIZO (1); Yemenite Association (1)

The Provisional State Council (Hebrew: מועצת המדינה הזמנית, Moetzet HaMedina HaZmanit) was the temporary legislature of Israel from shortly before independence until the election of the first Knesset in January 1949. It took the place of His Majesty's Privy Council, through which the British Government had legislated for Mandatory Palestine.

== History ==
The Provisional State Council was established under the name Moetzet HaAm (מועצת העם, lit. People's Council) on 12 April 1948 in preparation for independence just over a month later. There were 37 members representing all sides of the Jewish political spectrum, from the Revisionists to the Communists. A separate body, Minhelet HaAm was set up as the proto-cabinet, all of whose members were also members of Moetzet HaAm.

On 14 May at 13:50, Moetzet HaAm met at the Jewish National Fund building in Tel Aviv to vote on the text of the Israeli Declaration of Independence. Despite disagreements over issues such as borders and religion, it was passed unanimously and the meeting ended at 15:00, an hour before the declaration was to be made. The 37 members were those that signed the declaration.

Following independence, the body was renamed the Provisional State Council. Its last meeting was held on 3 February 1949, after which it was replaced by the Constituent Assembly which had been elected on 25 January. The Constituent Assembly first convened on 14 February, and two days later declared itself the first Knesset.

The council's titular figurehead, Chaim Weizmann, was Israel's de facto head of state until he was elected president in February 1949.

== Members ==
Party	Seats	Members
Mapai	10	David Ben-Gurion, Meir Argov, Yitzhak Ben-Zvi, Eliyahu Dobkin, Eliezer Kaplan, Avraham Katznelson, Golda Meir, David Remez, Mordechai Shatner, Moshe Sharett
General Zionists	3	Daniel Auster, Eliyahu Berligne, Peretz Bernstein
Hatzohar	3	Herzl Rosenblum, Zvi Segal, Ben-Zion Sternberg
Mapam	3	Mordechai Bentov, Zvi Luria, Aharon Zisling
Mizrachi	3	Wolf Gold, Yehuda Leib Maimon, David-Zvi Pinkas
New Aliyah Party/ Progressive Party	3	Avraham Granot, Moshe Kol, Pinchas Rosen
Agudat Yisrael	2	Meir David Loewenstein, Yitzhak Meir Levin
Hapoel HaMizrachi	2	Haim-Moshe Shapira, Zerach Warhaftig
Poalei Agudat Yisrael	1	Kalman Kahana
Ahdut HaAvoda - Poale Zion	1	Berl Repetur
Poale Zion Left	1	Nahum Nir
Palestine Communist Party/Maki	1	Meir Vilner (replaced by Shmuel Mikunis following independence)
Sephardim and Oriental Communities	1	Bechor-Shalom Sheetrit
WIZO	1	Rachel Cohen-Kagan
Yemenite Association	1	Saadia Kobashi
Independent	1	Yitzhak Gruenbaum
