= Yeshayahu Foerder =

German-Israeli lawyer and politician

Faction represented in the Knesset
- 1949–1957: Progressive Party

Personal details
- Born: 25 March 1901 Charlottenburg, Germany
- Died: 9 June 1970 (aged 69)

Yeshayahu Foerder (Hebrew: יְשַׁעְיָהוּ פוֹרְדֶר; 25 March 1901 – 9 June 1970) was a German–Israeli lawyer and politician who served as a member of the Knesset for the Progressive Party between 1949 and 1957.

== Biography ==
Born in Charlottenburg, Germany, Foerder studied economics and law at Freiburg, Heidelberg and Königsberg universities, gaining a law doctorate in 1923. He worked as a lawyer in Berlin between 1926 and 1932 and was a member of the directorate and the political secretary of the Zionist Organisation of Germany. He emigrated to Mandatory Palestine in 1933, and the following year was one of the founders of the Rassco housing company, of which he became general director. He also became chairman of the board of directors at Bank Leumi.

Foerder served as a delegate to the Assembly of Representatives for the New Aliyah Party. Following independence in 1948, he worked as an overseer of foodstuffs. In the first elections in 1949 he was elected to the Knesset on the Progressive Party list (the successor to the New Aliyah Party). Foerder represented the Progressive Party at the Liberal International congress in Stresa in 1956, to which he brought a draft resolution on the Israeli–Egyptian conflict. After discussion, the resolution was accepted without change.

Although he lost his seat in the July 1951 elections, he returned to the Knesset on 10 September that year as a replacement for Avraham Granot. He retained his seat in the 1955 elections, but resigned from the Knesset on 28 October 1957, in order to become head of Bank Leumi. He was replaced by Yohanan Cohen.

He died on 9 June 1970. The Foerder Institute for Economic Research at Tel Aviv University was established in his memory the following year.
