= Sixth government of Israel =

1955 government led by Moshe Sharett

Second Sharett Cabinet
- 6th Cabinet of Israel

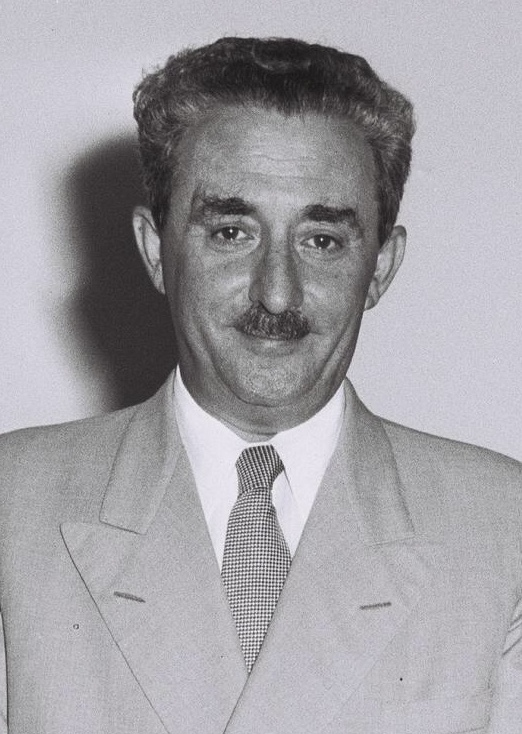
- Date formed: 29 June 1955
- Date dissolved: 3 November 1955

People and organisations
- Head of state: Yitzhak Ben-Zvi
- Head of government: Moshe Sharett
- Member parties: Mapai; Hapoel HaMizrachi; Mizrachi; Democratic List for Israeli Arabs; Progress and Work; Agriculture and Development
- Status in legislature: coalition
- Opposition leader: Peretz Bernstein

History
- Legislature term: 2nd Knesset
- Predecessor: 5th cabinet of Israel
- Successor: 7th cabinet of Israel

The sixth government of Israel was formed by Moshe Sharett during the second Knesset on 29 June 1955. Sharett dropped the General Zionists and the Progressive Party from his coalition, which included Mapai, Mizrachi, Hapoel HaMizrachi, the Democratic List for Israeli Arabs, Progress and Work and Agriculture and Development.

The only changes to the cabinet from the previous government were the dropping of General Zionist ministers Yosef Serlin, Israel Rokach and Yosef Sapir; instead of appointing new ministers to the cabinet to replace them, Sharett divided their portfolios out between existing ministers. Although his party departed from the coalition, Progressive Party MK Pinchas Rosen remained Minister of Justice. The government remained in place until 3 November 1955, more than three months after the July 1955 elections.

Sixth government of Israel
Portfolio	Minister	Party
Prime Minister; Minister of Foreign Affairs	Moshe Sharett	Mapai
Minister of Agriculture; Minister of Trade and Industry	Peretz Naftali	Mapai
Minister of Defense	David Ben-Gurion	Mapai
Minister of Development	Dov Yosef	Mapai
Minister of Education and Culture	Ben-Zion Dinor	Not an MK
Minister of Finance	Levi Eshkol	Mapai
Minister of Health	Dov Yosef	Mapai
Minister of Internal Affairs; Minister of Religions; Minister of Welfare	Haim-Moshe Shapira	Hapoel HaMizrachi
Minister of Justice	Pinchas Rosen	Progressive Party
Minister of Labour	Golda Meir	Mapai
Minister of Police	Bechor-Shalom Sheetrit	Mapai
Minister of Postal Services	Yosef Burg	Hapoel HaMizrachi
Minister of Transportation	Zalman Aran	Mapai
Deputy Minister of Agriculture	Yosef Efrati	Mapai
Deputy Minister of Welfare	Shlomo-Yisrael Ben-Meir	Mapai
Deputy Minister of Religions	Zorach Warhaftig	Hapoel HaMizrachi
