= Yohanan Cohen =

Israeli politician and diplomat

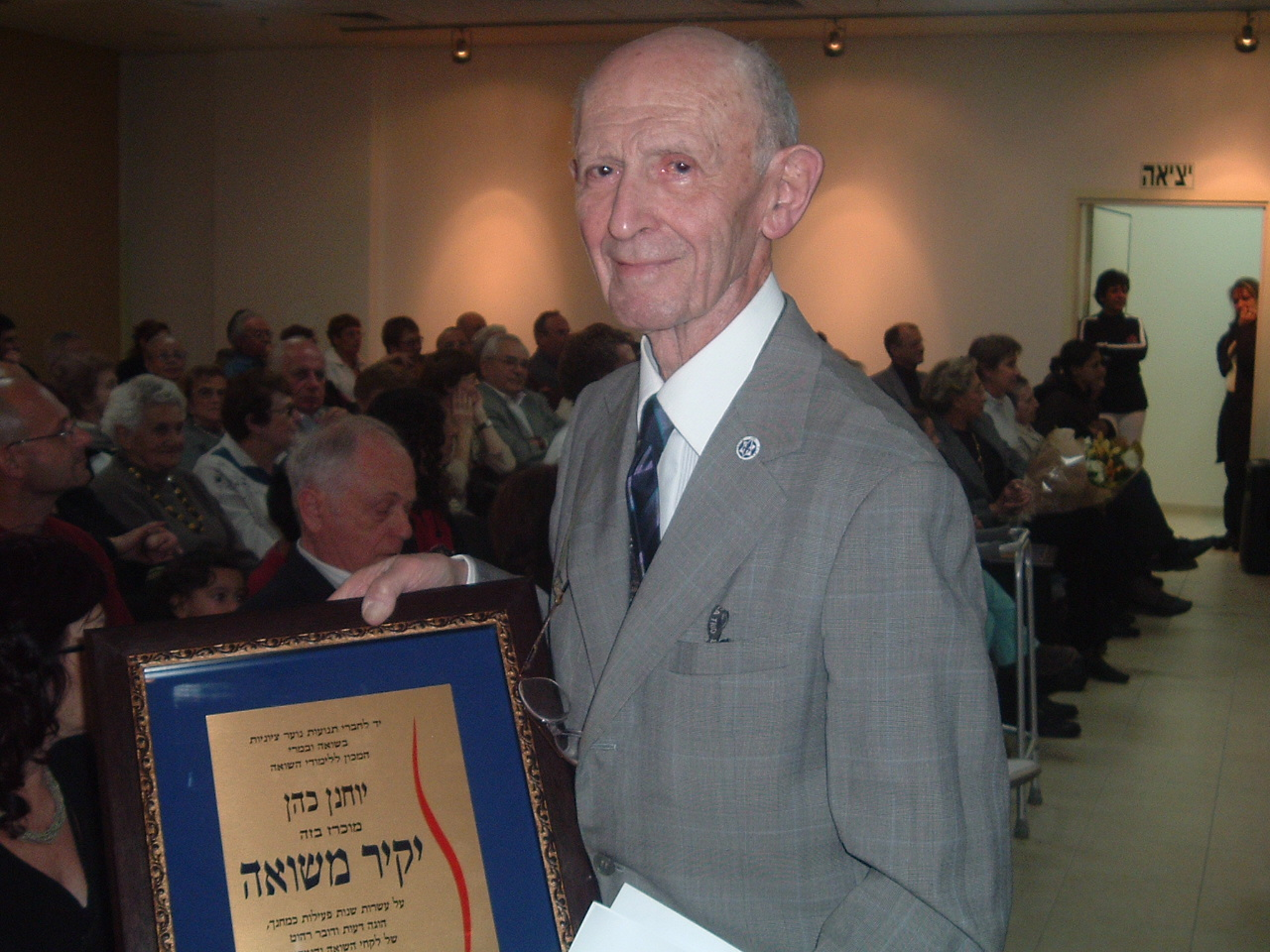

Faction represented in the Knesset
- 1957–1959: Progressive Party

Personal details
- Born: 31 December 1917; Łódź, Russian Empire
- Died: May 20, 2013 (aged 95)

Yohanan Cohen (Hebrew: יוחנן כהן; 31 December 1917 – 20 May 2013) was an Israeli politician and diplomat.

== Biography ==
Born in Łódź (then part of the Russian Empire, though occupied by Germany at the time), Cohen attended high school in Poland before and was active in the HaNoar Hatzioni group, before immigrating to Mandatory Palestine in 1937.

He joined the Hagana in 1938, and served as a member of the Jewish Settlement police between 1941 and 1944. During the 1948 Arab-Israeli War he served as a captain in the 19th Golani Brigade, and later served as a lieutenant colonel in the reserves.

Following Israeli independence, Cohen became a member of the Histadrut's organising committee, and was also a director of the secretariat of the World Zionist Youth group between 1952 and 1954.

A member of the Progressive Party, he was a member of the party's directorate and political committee. Whilst he was never elected to the Knesset, he served for two years between 1957 and 1959 as a replacement for Yeshayahu Forder.

He began working in the Ministry of Foreign Affairs in 1960, initially in the information department. In 1963 he was sent to Boston where he served as Consulate General. In 1968 he returned to Israel to become Director of the information department, and in 1970 became director of the Eastern Europe department.

In 1973 Cohen was appointed ambassador to Romania, moving to the same position in Finland in 1976. He returned to Israel in 1979, and in 1980 became Director of the History Department, a position he held until 1983.

== Bibliography ==
- Small nations in times of crisis & confrontation. State University of New York Press. 1989. ISBN 0-7914-0018-2.
- (in Hebrew) The Key is in the Hands of the Arabs (1962)
- (in Hebrew) The Growth of the Zionist Movement (1976)
- (in Hebrew) The Testing of Nations (1985)
- (in Hebrew)"OVRIM KOL GEVUL: "HA-BERIHAH", POLIN 1945-1946". Tel-Aviv: Zemorah-Bitan/Masuah. 1995. 484 pages.
