= Provisional government of Israel =

1948–49 government led by David Ben-Gurion

Provisional Cabinet of Israel
- Cabinet of Israel

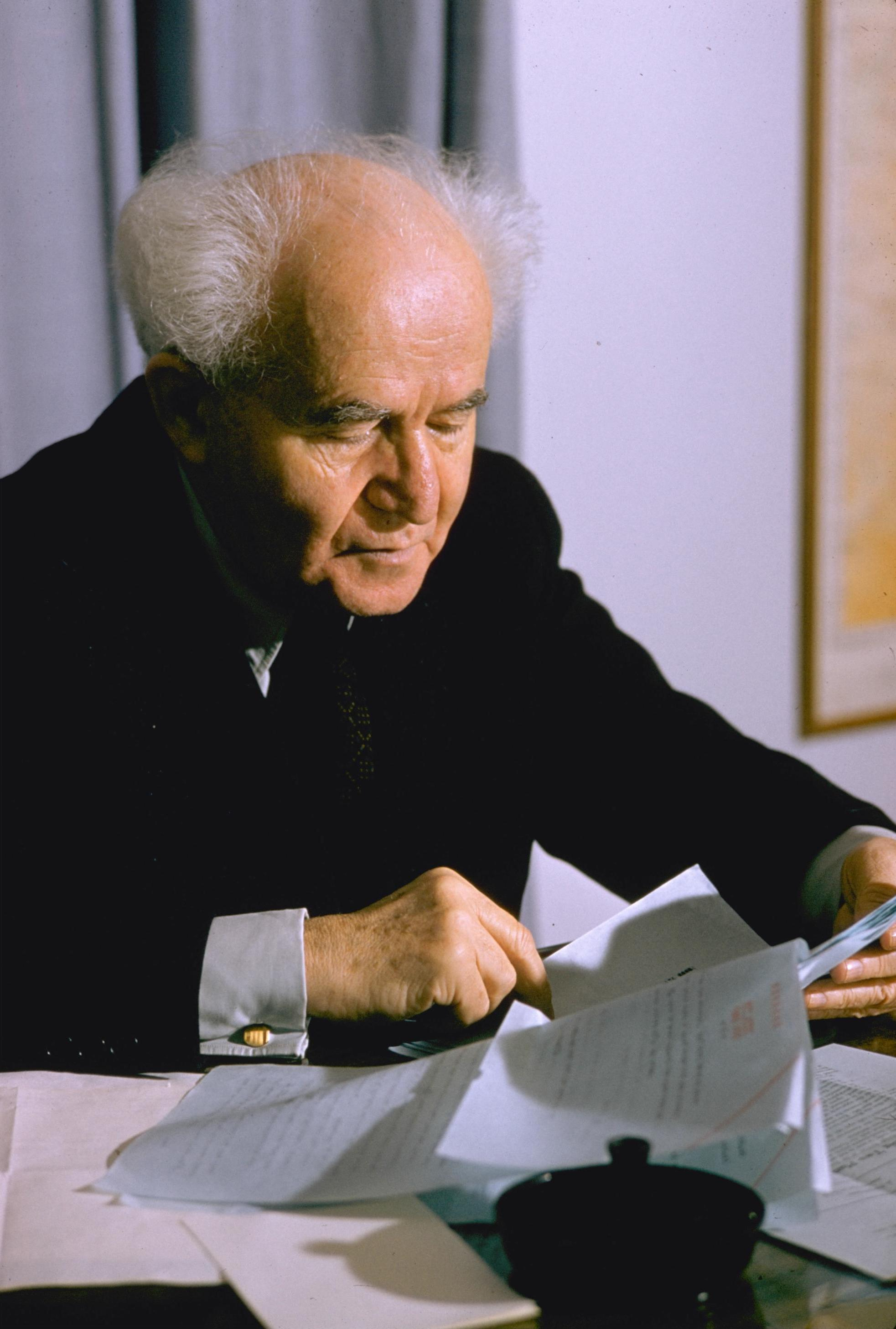
- Date formed: 14 May 1948
- Date dissolved: 10 March 1949

People and organisations
- Head of government: David Ben-Gurion
- Member parties: Mapai; Mapam; Hapoel HaMizrachi; New Aliyah Party; Progressive Party; Sephardim and Oriental Communities; Mizrachi; General Zionists; Agudat Yisrael
- Status in legislature: Coalition

History
- Successor: 1st Cabinet of Israel

The provisional government of Israel (Hebrew: הַמֶמְשָׁלָה הַזְמַנִּית, translit. HaMemshela HaZmanit) was the temporary cabinet which governed the newly established State of Israel, until the formation of the first government in March 1949 following the first Knesset elections in January that year.

With the British Mandate of Palestine scheduled to come to an end on 15 May 1948, the governing body of the Jewish community, the Jewish National Council (JNC), on 2 March 1948 began work on organization of a Jewish provisional government. On 12 April 1948 it formed the Minhelet HaAm (Hebrew: מנהלת העם, lit. People's Administration), all of its members being drawn from Moetzet HaAm (People's Council), the temporary legislative body set up at the same time. The departmental structure of the JNC served as a basis for the interim government ministries.

People's Administration (Minhelet HaAm)
Portfolio	Minister	Party
Prime Minister; Minister of Defense	David Ben-Gurion	Mapai
Minister of Agriculture	Aharon Zisling	Mapam
Minister of Finance	Eliezer Kaplan	Mapai
Minister of Foreign Affairs	Moshe Sharett	Mapai
Minister of Health; Minister of Immigration	Haim-Moshe Shapira	Hapoel HaMizrachi
Minister of Internal Affairs	Yitzhak Gruenbaum	Independent
Minister of Justice	Pinchas Rosen	New Aliyah Party/Progressive Party
Minister of Labour and Construction	Mordechai Bentov	Mapam
Minister of Police; Minority Affairs Minister of Israel	Bechor-Shalom Sheetrit	Sephardim and Oriental Communities
Minister of Religions; Minister of War Victims	Yehuda Leib Maimon	Mizrachi
Minister of Trade and Industry	Peretz Bernstein	General Zionists
Minister of Transportation	David Remez	Mapai
Minister of Welfare	Yitzhak-Meir Levin	Agudat Yisrael

On 12 May, Minhelet HaAm convened to vote on whether to declare independence. Three of the thirteen members were missing, with Yehuda Leib Maimon and Yitzhak Gruenbaum being stuck in Jerusalem, whilst Yitzhak-Meir Levin was in the United States. The meeting started at 1:45 in the afternoon and ended after midnight. The decision was between accepting the American proposal for a truce, or declaring independence. The latter option was put to a vote, with six of the ten members present supporting it:

- For: David Ben-Gurion, Mordechai Bentov, Moshe Sharett (Mapai), Peretz Bernstein (General Zionists), Haim-Moshe Shapira (Hapoel HaMizrachi), Aharon Zisling (Mapam).
- Against: Eliezer Kaplan, David Remez (Mapai), Pinchas Rosen (New Aliyah Party), Bechor-Shalom Sheetrit (Sephardim and Oriental Communities).

On 14 May, the day Israel declared independence, Minhelet HaAm became the Provisional government, whilst Moetzet HaAm became the Provisional State Council. The Provisional government was promptly recognised by the United States as the de facto authority of Israel, followed by Iran (which had voted against the UN partition plan), Guatemala, Iceland, Nicaragua, Romania, and Uruguay. The Soviet Union granted official recognition to Israel on 17 May 1948, followed by Poland, Czechoslovakia, Yugoslavia, Ireland, and South Africa. The United States extended de jure recognition after the first Israeli election, on 31 January 1949.
