= Saadia Kobashi =

Israeli Yemenite Jewish leader

- Born: 1902; Yemen
- Died: 24 January 1990 (age 88); Tel Aviv, Israel
- Political party: Yemenite Association

Saadia Kobashi (Hebrew: סעדיה כובשי; Arabic: سعديه كوبشي, 1902–24 January 1990) was a leader of the Yemenite Jewish community in Israel, and one of the signatories of the country's declaration of independence.

== Biography ==
Kobashi was born in Yemen in 1902. He emigrated to Ottoman Palestine in 1909, settling in Jerusalem.

A member of the Jewish National Council and Moetzet HaAm on behalf of the Yemenite Association, he signed the declaration of independence in 1948 as S. Kobashi, adding HaLevi at the end (referring to the tribe of Levi). After independence, he moved to Tel Aviv and was appointed supervisor of the Religious-Zionist education system. He became headmaster of a religious-Zionist school in Rosh HaAyin in 1949, where today a street is named after him.

Kobashi died in 1990 and was buried in Har HaMenuchot in Jerusalem.
