= Zvi Lurie =

Israeli politician and Signatory of the Declaration of Independence

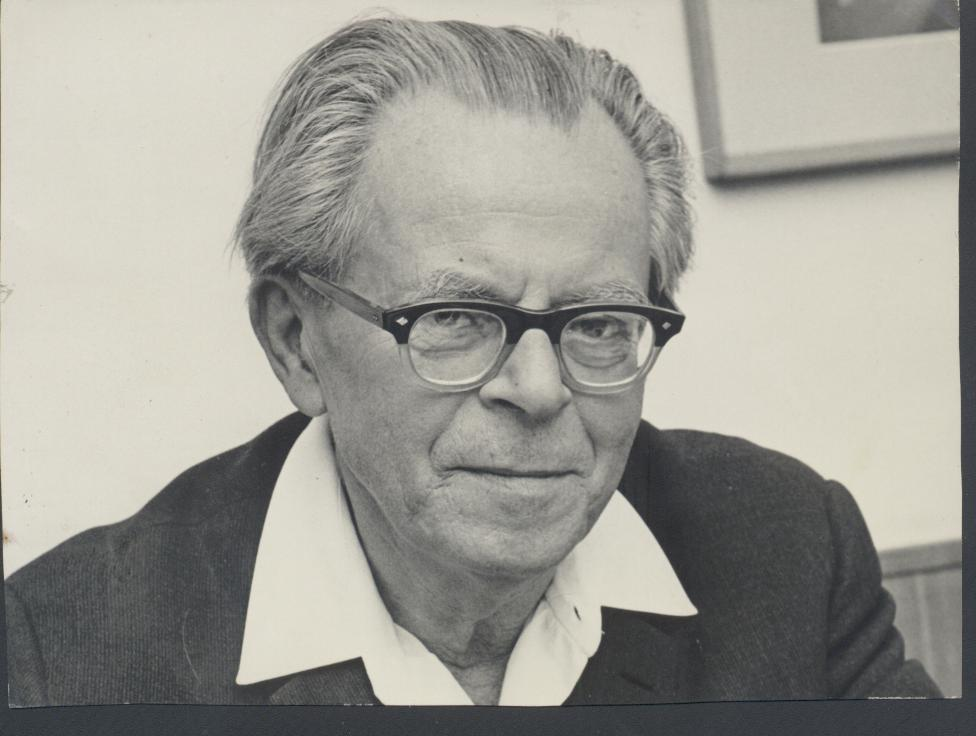
Zvi Lurie, taken at his desk in Tel Aviv between his return to Israel in 1954 and his death in 1968, Most likely 1962.

Zvi Lurie (Hebrew: צבי לוריא; 1 June 1906 – 21 May 1968) was a Jewish political figure in Mandatory Palestine. A member of the Jewish National Council, he was amongst the signatories of the Israeli declaration of independence.

== Biography ==
Zvi Lurie was born in Łódź in the Russian Empire (today in Poland). He immigrated to Mandatory Palestine in 1924. Lurie was a founder of kibbutz Ein Shemer.

== Zionist and political activism ==
Lurie was a member of Hashomer Hatzair, serving as its general secretary between 1935 and 1937. He was a member of the Jewish National Council on behalf of Hashomer Hatzair, a prominent socialist Zionist youth movement, from 1935 to 1937, and was co-opted into the Provisional State Council following Israel's declaration of independence in May 1948. He also helped establish Kol Yisrael, which broadcast the declaration. He was also a representative of the Mapam labor party, which was a left-wing Zionist party. As a committed labor leader, he was involved in Jewish community affairs and had an influential role in the political organizations guiding the Yishuv (Jewish community in Palestine).

After signing the declaration, Lurie left Israel to work on strengthening ties between Israel and the Jewish people with the Jewish Agency as a representative of Mapam (of which Hashomer Hatzair was a part). He died in 1968.
