= Eliyahu Berligne =

Zionist activist

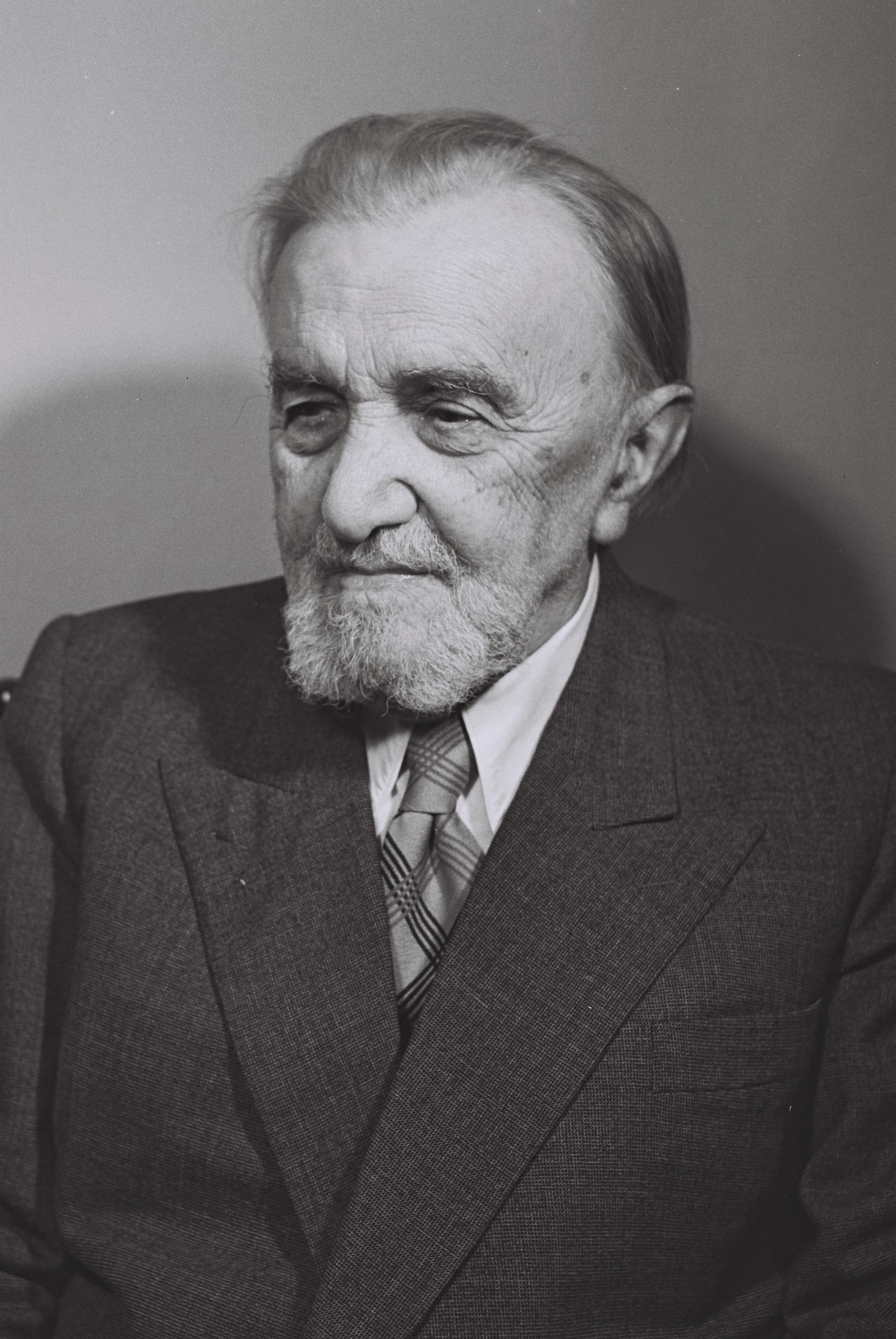
- Berligne in 1956
- Born: 1866; Russian Empire
- Died: 25 February 1959 (aged 92–93)
- Known for: Signatory of the Israeli declaration of independence

Eliyahu Berligne (Hebrew: אליהו ברלין; 1866 – 25 February 1959) was a founder of Tel Aviv, an important member of the Yishuv in Mandate Palestine and a signatory of the Israeli declaration of independence.

== Biography ==
Born in what is today Belarus in 1866, Berligne was an activist in Hovevei Zion and attended the First Zionist Congress in 1897. An opponent of the British Uganda Program, he visited Ottoman Palestine in 1905, and immigrated two years later, settling in Jaffa. After arriving, he founded an olive oil and soap factory in the Haifa and Gush Dan area, with the principle of Hebrew Labour.

A founder of the Progressive Party, Berligne later joined the General Zionists and was a member of the Jewish National Council. He served as treasurer of the council between 1920 and 1948, as well as manager of Bank Hapoalim.

In 1948 he was amongst the 37 people to sign Israel's declaration of independence, although he was unable to attend the declaration ceremony due to illness.
