= Avida =

Avida may refer to:

- Avida (software), artificial life software platform
- Avida (film), 2006 French film
- Avida, the former name of the kibbutz Neve Harif
- Mordechai Avida, Israeli radio broadcaster

== See also ==
- Abida (biblical figure)
- Avida Dollars
