= Mordechai Shatner =

Israeli politician

Mordechai Schattner (Hebrew: מרדכי שטנר; 1904 – 16 April 1964) was a Zionist activist and a signatory of the Israeli declaration of independence.

== Biography ==
A member of kibbutz Ein Harod, Shatner worked in Europe between the First and Second World Wars rescuing Jews, a period during which he met Adolf Eichmann. After the outbreak of World War II he worked for aliyah from England.

After returning to Mandate Palestine, he joined the Jewish National Council, working on national infrastructure. He campaigned against the treatment of Jewish prisoners held by the British, and was arrested during the Operation Agatha and imprisoned in the Atlit detainee camp, Rafah and Latrun. During that time he served as the representative of the Jewish detainees to the British authorities.

On 14 May 1948, Shatner was one of the people to sign the Israeli declaration of independence, and joined the Provisional State Council. After independence he worked on the development of Jerusalem, was one of the founders of Yad Vashem, and was also a member of the committee that appointed judges to the Supreme Court of Israel.

Shatner served as the CEO of the Department of Industry and Commerce, and was in charge of the financial market. He was also an interim supervisor of the real estate of the Arabs who fled Israel during the Independence War of 1948. He was the main figure in the foundation of the Israeli town of Nazareth Illit and the Wingate Sports Center that was named after his friend Orde Wingate.

The Shatner Centre in Jerusalem was named after him. His son, David, is an expert on water and the "borders of Israel" and was in the delegations that brokered peace agreements with Jordan, Syria and the Palestinian National Authority.
