= Meir David Loewenstein =

Israeli politician

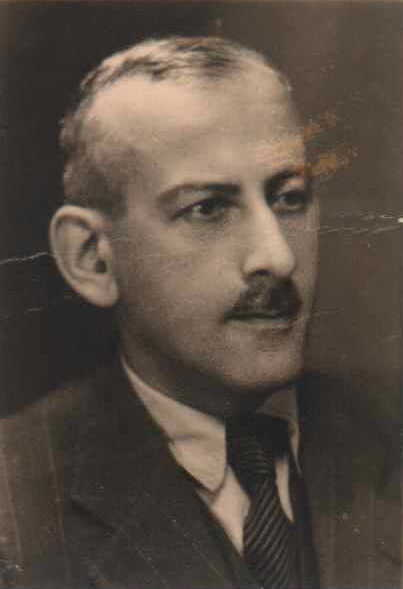

Faction represented in the Knesset
- 1949–1951: United Religious Front

Personal details
- Born: 1 June 1904 Copenhagen, Denmark
- Died: 15 August 1995 (aged 91) Bnei Brak, Israel

Meir David Loewenstein (Hebrew: מאיר-דוד לוונשטיין; 1 June 1904 – 15 August 1995) was an Israeli politician and one of the signatories of the Israeli declaration of independence.

== Biography ==
Born in Copenhagen in Denmark in 1904, Loewenstein studied at a business school in Switzerland and a rabbinical seminary in Amsterdam, Netherlands. During his youth he became involved in the European Agudat Yisrael youth movement, of which he later became chairman.

After emigrating to Mandatory Palestine in 1934, he remained active in Agudat Yisrael. As a prominent member of the organisation, Loewenstein became a member of Moetzet HaAm (later the Provisional State Council), and signed Israel's declaration of independence in 1948. However, he later claimed:

It ignored our sole right to Eretz Israel, which is based on the covenant of the Lord with Abraham, our father, and repeated promises in the Tanach. It ignored the aliya of the Ramban and the students of the Vilna Gaon and the Ba'al Shem Tov, and the [rights of] Jews who lived in the 'Old Yishuv'.

He was elected to the Knesset in the country's first elections in 1949 as a member of the United Religious Front, an alliance of the four major religious parties. However, he lost his seat in the 1951 elections.

Loewenstein rejected the idea of a constitution for Israel, stating:

If it contradicts the Torah of Israel, it is a revolt against the Almighty; if it is identical with the Torah, it is superfluous. A constitution will lead to an uncompromising fight... a Kulturkampf.

In 1972 Loewenstein became chairman of the Committee for Spiritual Salvation. He died in 1995.
