= Zvi Segal =

Israeli activist (1901–1965)

Zvi Segal (Hebrew: צבי סגל; 1901–1965) was a Revisionist Zionist activist and a signatory of the Israeli declaration of independence.

A member of the Irgun, Segal was deported to Eritrea by the British during the Mandate era. He served as vice-president of the Revisionist movement from 1940 until 1948, when he signed Israel's declaration of independence. He was immediately co-opted into the Provisional State Council and sat on the finance committee; however, after Menachem Begin founded the rival Herut movement, Segal left politics and turned to the real estate business.
