= Ben-Zion Sternberg =

Israeli activist

Ben-Zion (Benno) Sternberg (Hebrew: בן-ציון שטרנברג; 1894 – May 31, 1962), was a Romanian Zionist and signatory of the Declaration of the Establishment of the State of Israel.

Sternberg was born in Czernowitz, Bukovina, a region of the Austro-Hungarian Empire, to a relatively prosperous local Jewish family. His father Abraham was a landowner in the thriving Jewish community of Bukovina.

== Pre World War II ==
Sternberg was a prominent local Zionist from a young age. In 1914 put his nationalist aspirations on hold to serve as an officer of Austria-Hungary during the First World War. Prior to and following the war, Sternberg was a leading member of the Hebronia movement, a leading local Zionist movement. In 1920 he addressed 600 visiting Romanian dignitaries (Czernowitz became a part of newly enlarged Romania following the dissolution of Austria-Hungary) in Hebrew, marking the first significant attempt to bring the rebirth of the language to the attention of a non-Jewish audience.

Following the Treaty of Versailles and Britain’s assuming the mandate for Palestine, Sternberg affiliated himself closely with the Revisionist movement - an affiliation which he was to retain for the rest of his political life. Sternberg gradually emerged as a leading light of the Revisionist-Zionist movement. He received Dr. Chaim Weizmann during his visit to Czernowitz, who, in a friendly barb, thanked "his esteemed opposition" for the greeting.

In 1926 Vladimir Jabotinsky visited Czernowitz for the first time. During this visit he and Sternberg began their close political alliance. Sternberg was elected chairman of the All Romanian Revisionist Federal Organisation, following which he became a leading exponent of Revisionism at multiple Zionist Congresses.

== World War II and the establishment of the State of Israel ==
Sternberg continued to fulfill his prominent role in international Zionism from Romania until the Nazi persecutions of the Second World War. Upon the outbreak of war, he fled Europe with his family to Mandate Palestine. Unlike most Jewish refugees who had to be secretly spirited into the territory, Sternberg had the unusual distinction of arriving under diplomatic protection into Mandate Palestine on board a vessel of the British Royal Navy.

Sternberg maintained his prominent political role during the War and in the years leading up to the birth of the State of Israel. With Jabotinsky’s death in 1940, Sternberg took on an increasingly visible role in leading the Revisionist movement. During these years he played a central role in coordinating efforts to aid Jewish refugees fleeing the Nazis migrate to Mandate Palestine. The British White Paper of 1939 had severely limited Jewish migration to Palestine, ensuring that only 75,000 Jews were officially granted permission to enter during the years of the War, despite the genocide taking place in Europe. For his attempts to help Jewish refugees subvert the British immigration authorities, Sternberg was jailed for one month at Latrun jail, near Jerusalem.

With the withdrawal of the British Mandate, Sternberg represented the Revisionist movement in the historic Declaration of the Establishment of the State of Israel on May 14, 1948. Following David Ben-Gurion's speech to the Vaad Leumi gathered at the then Tel-Aviv Museum of Art, Sternberg was one of the 37 signatories of the Declaration. During Israel’s early years, marked by war and a struggle for survival against the powers of the Arab world, Sternberg continued to serve the Zionist cause as a member of Israel’s Provisional Council of State. Following the birth of the new state, Sternberg continued to serve his country as Director of the Investment Centre at the Ministry of Trade. He remained active in politics and civil service until his death in 1962.
