= Eliyahu Dobkin =

Israeli independence activist and art collector

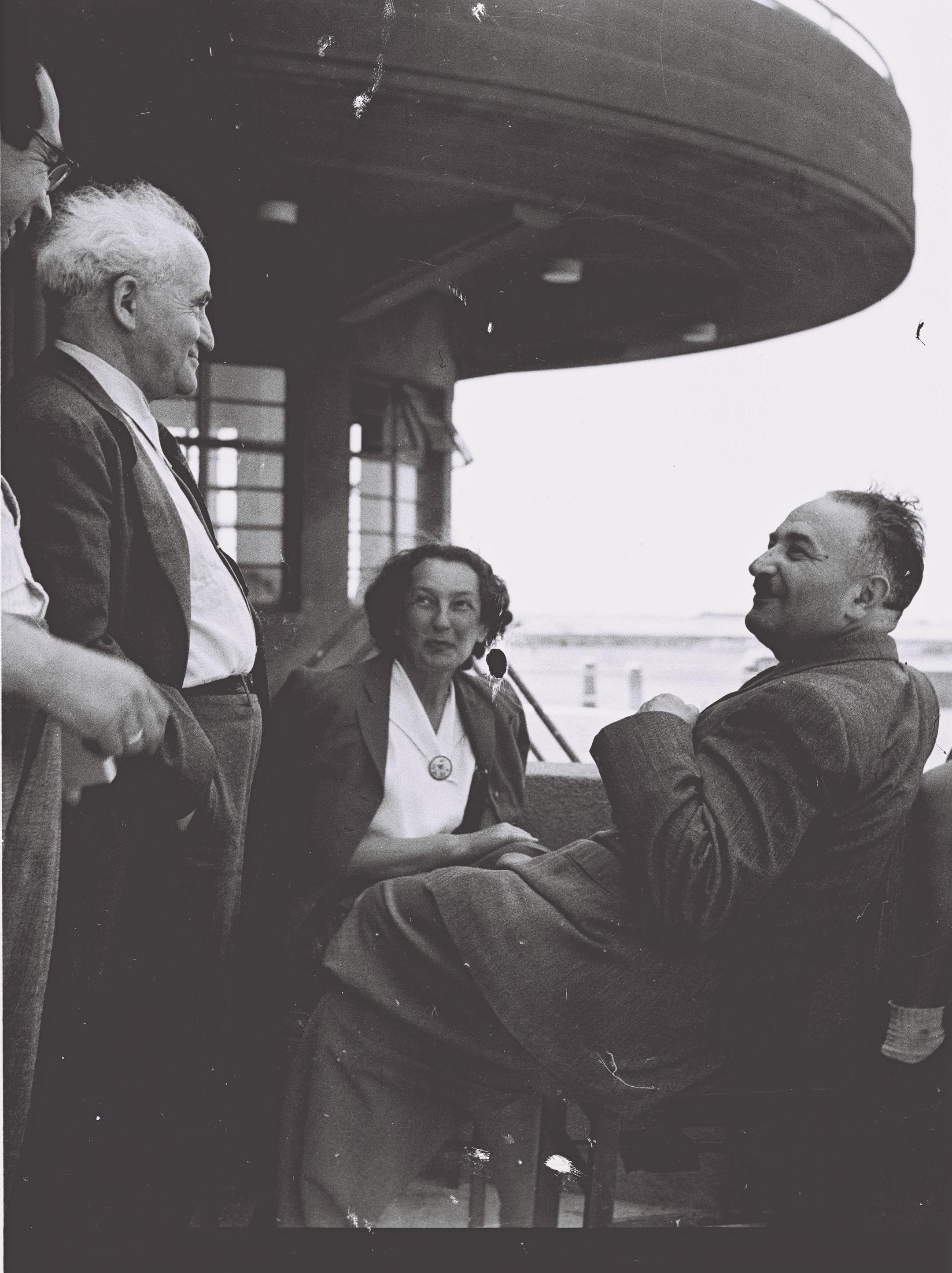
Eliyahu Dobkin (seated right) and his wife speaking with David Ben-Gurion (second from left) at Lod Airport before their flight to New York, May 1947.

Eliyahu Dobkin (Hebrew: אליהו דובקין; 31 December 1898 – 26 October 1976) was a leading figure of the Labor Zionism movement, a signatory of the Israeli Declaration of Independence and a founder of the Israel Museum. He was also active in the Jewish Agency and the World Zionist Organization.

== Biography ==
Eliyahu Dobkin was born in Babruysk in the Russian Empire (today in Belarus) to a religious-Zionist family. His father, Yosef, worked in the lumber and banking industries, and was a member of the Mizrahi movement. Dobkin was schooled in a heder and gymnasium and later studied in Kharkiv (today in Ukraine), where he founded the Zionist student movement HaHaver in 1914. In 1917 he joined the HeHalutz movement founded in the same year by Joseph Trumpeldor.

After World War I the family fled the Bolsheviks and settled in Białystok in Poland. In 1921 he was elected general secretary of the world HeHalutz movement, which was headquartered in Warsaw. There he met Simcha Blass, who would later marry Dobkin's sister Yehudit.

On 6 June 1932 Dobkin immigrated to Mandatory Palestine with his wife and daughter and settled in Tel Aviv. That year he became a member of the Histadrut trade union. Between 1933 and 1968 he was a member of the Zionist Workers' Committee. In 1936 he joined the Jewish Agency, and headed its immigration department during World War II with the responsibility for rescuing Jews from Europe and illegal Jewish immigration to Mandate Palestine. He became a member of its executive in 1946, serving until 1948.

When Israel declared independence on 14 May 1948, Dobkin was one of the designated signatories. However, at the time he was trapped in besieged Jerusalem, and added his signature at a later point. In the same year he became head of Keren Hayesod, a post he held until 1961. In 1951 he also took over as head of the Jewish Agency's youth and HeHalutz, serving until 1968.

An art collector, Dobkin was head of the Bezalel museum and later founded the Israel Museum, sitting on its board until his death.

== See also ==
- Visual arts in Israel
