= Mordechai Avida =

Mordechai Avida (Hebrew: מרדכי אבידע; 1909–1986), born Mordechai Zlotnik, was a radio broadcaster of Kol Israel in its preliminary stages. He was the first one to broadcast from the new station. His voice starts the Recording of The Israeli Declaration of Independence with the words (in Hebrew): "Here is the Voice of Israel! Here is the Voice of Israel!". Mordechai Avida with his colleague Rita Persits broadcast the ceremony together.
