= Bechor-Shalom Sheetrit =

Israeli politician (1895–1967)

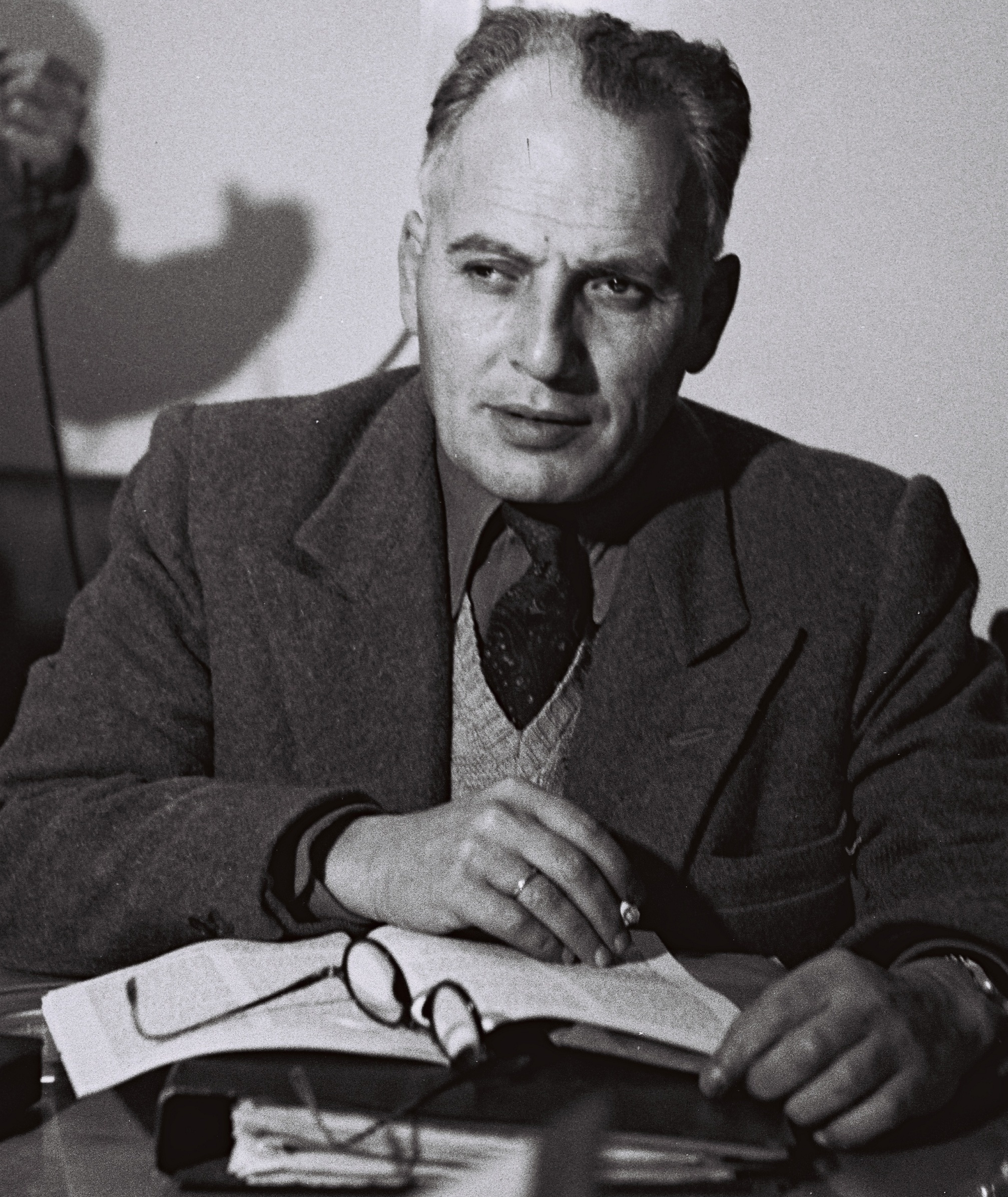
- Sheetrit in 1949

Ministerial roles
- 1948–1967: Minister of Police
- 1948–1949: Minister of Minority Affairs

Faction represented in the Knesset
- 1949–1951: Sephardim & Oriental Communities
- 1951–1965: Mapai
- 1965–1967: Alignment

Personal details
- Born: 20 January 1895 Tiberias, Ottoman Empire
- Died: 28 January 1967 (aged 72)
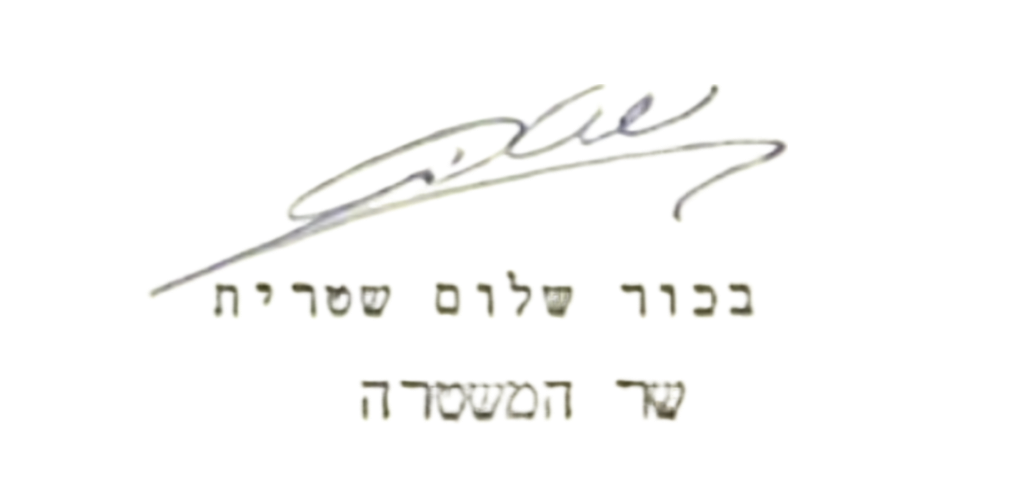
- Signature

Bechor-Shalom Sheetrit (Hebrew: בכור-שלום שטרית; 20 January 1895 – 28 January 1967) was an Israeli politician, minister and the only signatory of the Israeli declaration of independence to have been born in territory that later became Israel. He served as Minister of Police from independence in 1948 until shortly before his death in 1967, making him the longest-serving cabinet member in the same portfolio to date.

== Biography ==
Sheetrit was born in Tiberias in 1895, then part of the Ottoman Empire to a Moroccan Jewish family that had immigrated to Ottoman Palestine in the 19th century. He was educated at a heder, Alliance school and a yeshiva. After school he attended the Hebrew University of Jerusalem where he was certified as a lawyer.

He became involved in Zionist activities as a youth, and was a founder of the Tehiya Zionist association in his home town. He also joined Hapoel Hatzair after being influenced by kibbutz Degania.

During World War I he held the position of Mukhtar of Kinneret and organised local police until the British Army entered the area.

Following the war he held several positions in the police, including Commander of the Lower Galilee area (where he helped organised the Jewish Mounted Police) and deputy commander of the police academy in Jerusalem. Sheetrit was the prosecutor in the Haim Arlosoroff assassination case. After being made a District Judge in 1935, he served as head district judge in Lod between 1945 and 1948.

A prominent member of the Sephardim and Oriental Communities party, Sheetrit joined the pre-state legislature, Moetzet HaAm. He was also the single Sephardi member of Minhelet HaAm, the proto-cabinet. After signing the Israeli declaration of independence on 14 May 1948, Sheetrit was appointed Minister of Police and Minister of Minority Affairs (a new position) in David Ben-Gurion's provisional government.

Although Sheetrit held doubts about the loyalty to the new state of Israeli Arabs, as a native speaker of Palestinian Arabic he was popular with the Arab community. However, following disagreements with the Ministry of Religions and the Military government (which controlled most Arab areas after the war had ended), the Ministry of Minority Affairs was closed in 1949.

After the first Knesset elections in 1949, in which it won four seats under his leadership, the party rejoined Ben-Gurion's government and Sheetrit remained Minister of Police. Prior to the 1951 elections, Sheetrit defected to Ben-Gurion's Mapai, and was reappointed to his ministerial post after winning a seat for his new party in the elections.

Re-elected in 1955, 1959, 1961 and 1965 (by which time Mapai had merged into Alignment), Sheetrit retained his cabinet post under new prime ministers Moshe Sharett and Levi Eshkol. He stood down as Minister of Police on 2 January 1967 after more than 18 years as a minister and serving in fourteen different governments. He died 26 days later.
