= Avraham Granot =

Israeli politician (1890–1962)

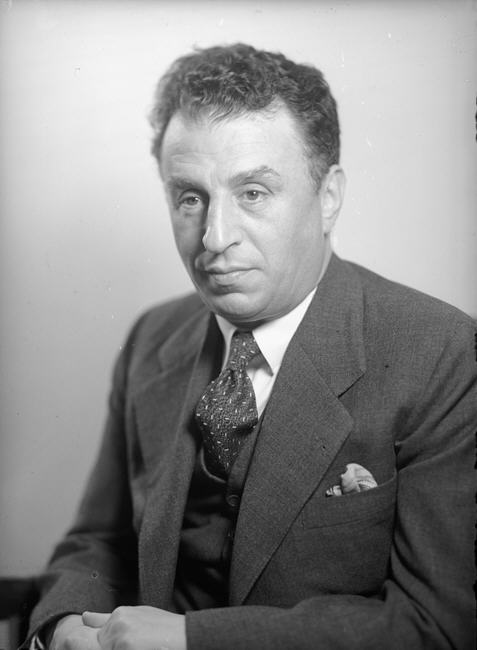
- Granot in 1940

Faction represented in the Knesset
- 1949–1951: Progressive Party

Personal details
- Born: 18 June 1890 Fălești, Russian Empire
- Died: 5 July 1962 (aged 72) Jerusalem, Israel

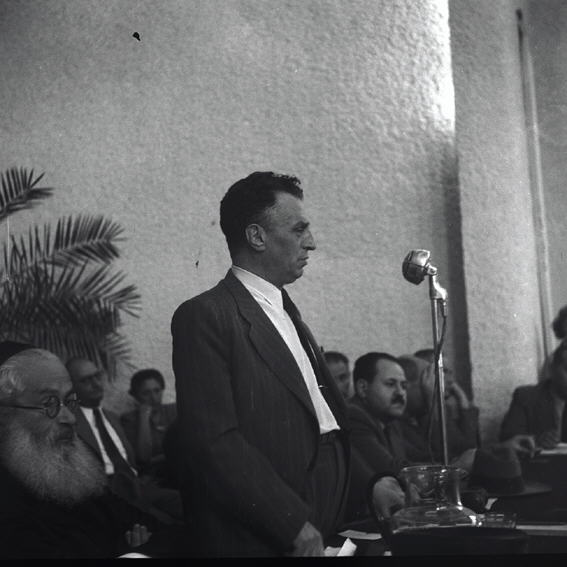
Avraham Granot 1945

Avraham Granot (Hebrew: אברהם גרנות; 18 June 1890 – 5 July 1962) was a Zionist activist, Israeli politician and a signatory of the Israeli declaration of independence.

== Biography ==
Granot was born Abraham Granovsky in Fălești, in the Beletsky Uyezd of the Bessarabia Governorate of the Russian Empire (today Moldova) in 1890. After moving to Palestine in 1907 he attended Gymnasia Herzliya in Tel Aviv. In 1911 he started studying law and political economy at the University of Fribourg and University of Lausanne, graduating with a PhD in 1917.

In 1919 he began working for the Jewish National Fund (JNF) in the Hague, and was relocated to Jerusalem in 1922. He also lectured at the Hebrew University of Jerusalem on agrarian policy. In 1940 he was appointed director-general of the JNF.

Granot was a member of the New Aliyah Party and one of the signers of the Israeli declaration of independence in 1948. In 1949 he was elected to the first Knesset as a member of the Progressive Party (the successor of the New Aliyah Party). He was re-elected in 1951, but resigned from the Knesset six weeks after the election. He was head of several public corporations, and sat on the Board of Governors of the Hebrew University of Jerusalem and the Weizmann Institute of Science.

In 1960 Granot was elected chairman of the JNF Board of Directors.

== Commemoration ==
Neve Granot, a neighborhood in Jerusalem near the Israel Museum is named for him. The main street is Avraham Granot Street.

== Books (English) ==
- Land Problems in Palestine (1926)
- Land Taxation in Palestine (1927)
- Land and the Jewish Reconstruction in Palestine (1931)
- The Fiscal System in Palestine (1952)
- Agrarian Reform and the Record of Israel (1956)
