= Israeli Declaration of Independence =

1948 establishment of a Jewish state

Declaration of the Establishment of the State of Israel
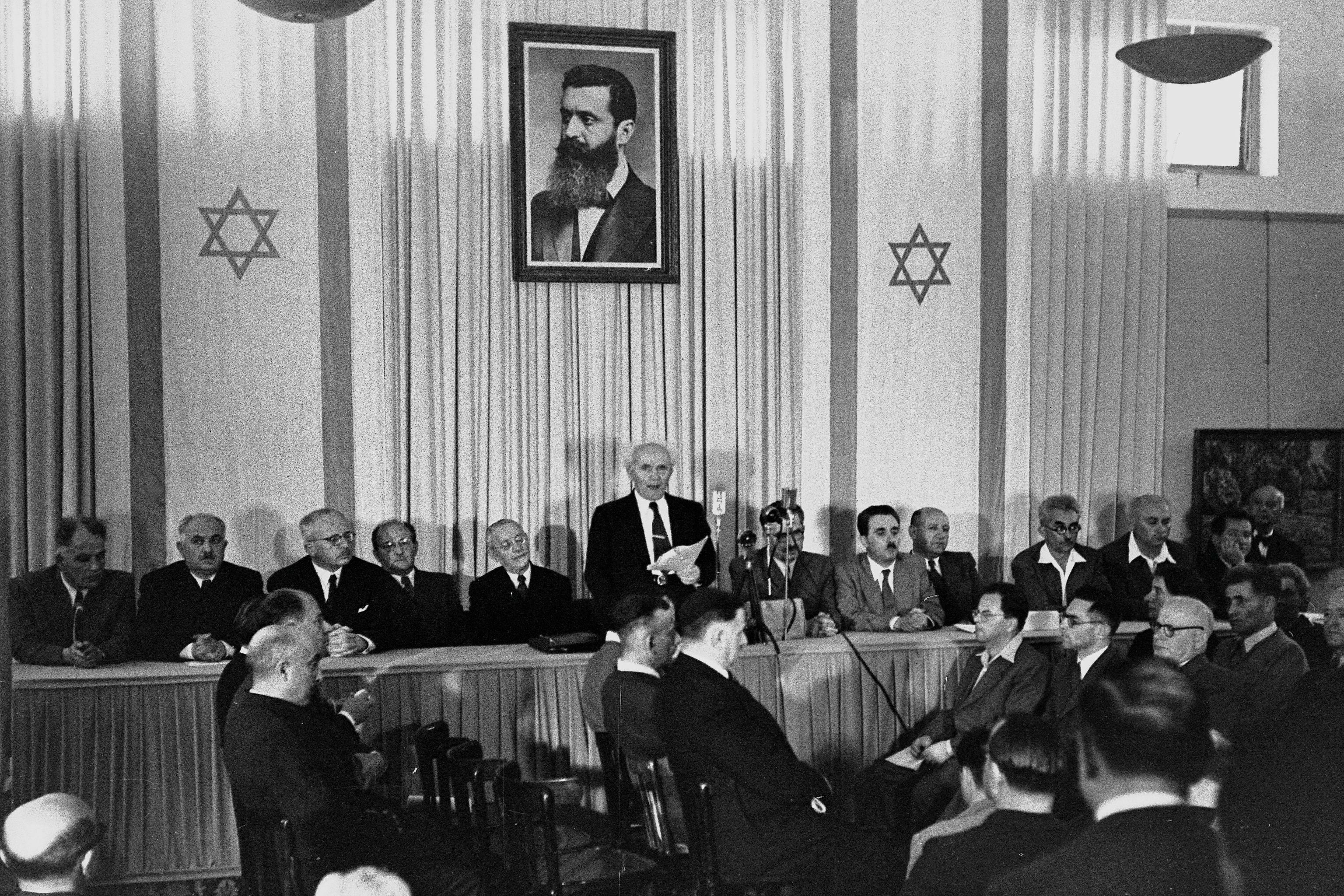
- Ben-Gurion proclaiming the declaration of independence
- Original title: מגילת העצמאות של מדינת ישראל
- Created: 14 May 1948; 78 years ago (5 Iyar 5708)
- Location: Tel Aviv
- Author(s): First Draft: Zvi Berenson; Second Draft: Moshe Shertok; David Remez; Felix Rosenblueth; Moshe Shapira; Aharon Zisling; Third Draft: David Ben-Gurion; Yehuda Leib Fishman; Aharon Zisling; Moshe Shertok
- Signatories: All 37 members of the Provisional State Council (Moetzet HaAm)
- Purpose: Declare a Jewish state in Palestine shortly before the expiration of the British Mandate.

Wikisource
- Declaration of the Establishment of the State of Israel; he:מגילת העצמאות של מדינת ישראל

The Israeli Declaration of Independence, formally the Declaration of the Establishment of the State of Israel (Hebrew: הכרזה על הקמת מדינת ישראל), was proclaimed at the Tel Aviv Museum on 14 May 1948 (5 Iyar 5708), at the end of the civil war phase and beginning of the Arab–Israeli War of the 1948 Palestine war, by the Va'ad Leumi led by David Ben-Gurion, the executive head of the World Zionist Organization (Note: Then known as the Zionist Organization.) and chairman of the Jewish Agency for Palestine.

It declared the establishment of a Jewish state in Palestine (or the Land of Israel in the Jewish tradition), to be known as the State of Israel, which would come into effect on termination of the British Mandate at midnight that day. While celebrated in Israel as Independence Day, a national holiday on 5 Iyar of every year according to the Hebrew calendar, Palestinians view the day as the start of Nakba, or "catastrophe", marking the mass displacements of Palestinians and the loss of homes and lands, and commemorate it annually on 15 May as Nakba Day.

== Background ==
=== Zionist aspirations and the Balfour Declaration ===
The idea of a Jewish homeland in Palestine had been a goal of Zionist organisations since the late 19th century. In 1917 British foreign secretary Arthur Balfour expressed support for this goal in a letter to British Jewish community leader Walter, Lord Rothschild:

His Majesty's government view with favour the establishment in Palestine of a national home for the Jewish people, and will use their best endeavours to facilitate the achievement of this object, it being clearly understood that nothing shall be done which may prejudice the civil and religious rights of existing non-Jewish communities in Palestine, or the rights and political status enjoyed by Jews in any other country.

Through this letter, which became known as the Balfour Declaration, British government policy officially endorsed Zionism. After World War I, the United Kingdom was given a mandate for Palestine, which it had conquered from the Ottomans during the war.

=== International efforts and the UN Partition Plan ===
In 1937 the Peel Commission suggested partitioning Mandate Palestine into an Arab state and a Jewish state, though the proposal was rejected as unworkable by the government and was at least partially to blame for the renewal of the 1936–39 Arab revolt.

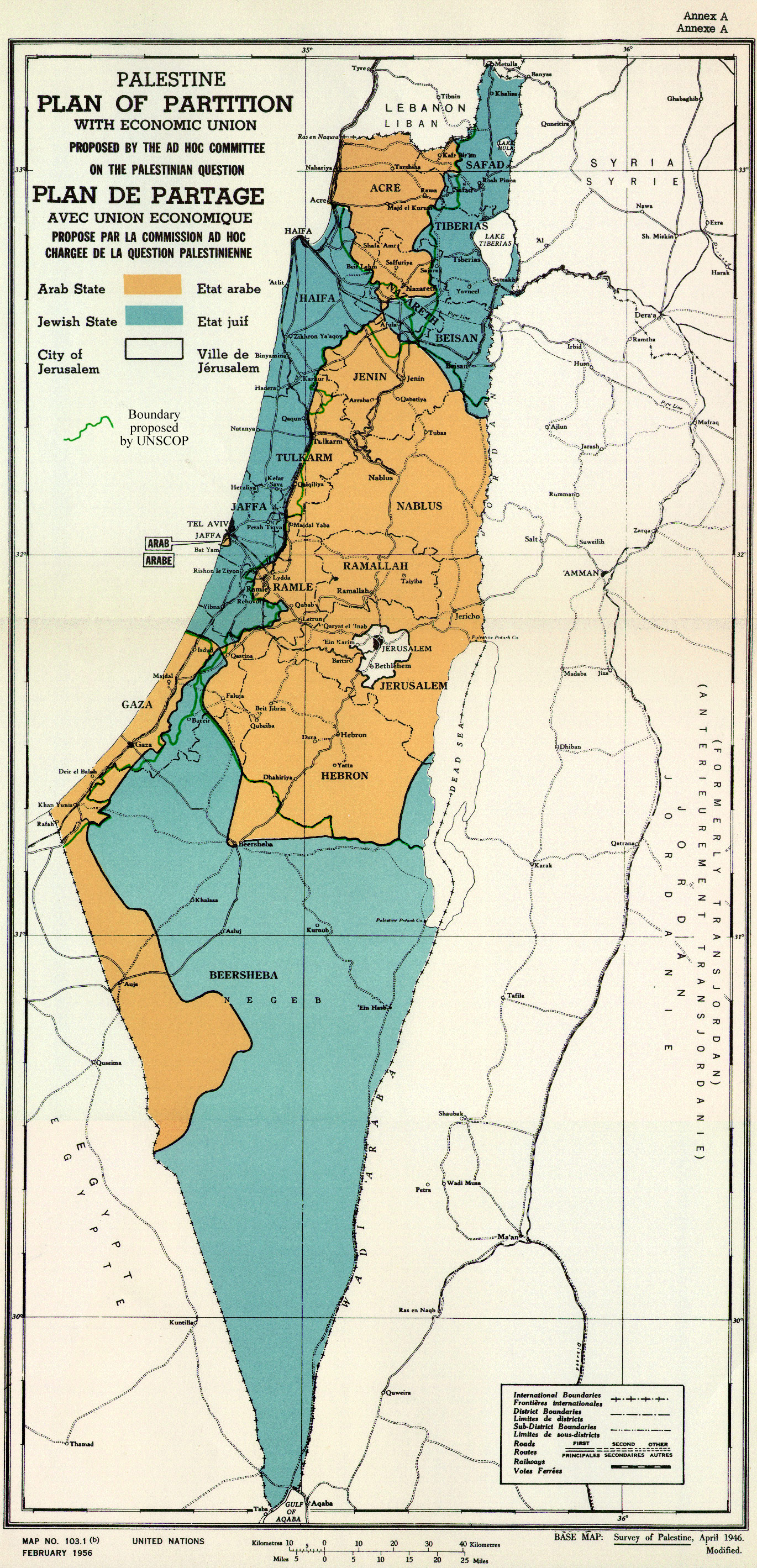
The UN partition plan

In the face of increasing violence after World War II, the British handed the issue over to the recently established United Nations. The result was Resolution 181(II), a plan to partition Palestine into Independent Arab and Jewish States and the Special International Regime for the City of Jerusalem. The Jewish state was to receive around 56% of the land area of Mandate Palestine, encompassing 82% of the Jewish population. At the time, however, Jews were a minority of the total population of Mandate Palestine, while Arabs constituted the majority. Although they were given more than half of the land area of Mandate Palestine, Jews had only owned approximately 7% of the land in 1947.

The plan was accepted by most of the Jewish population, but rejected by much of the Arab populace. On 29 November 1947, the resolution to recommend to the United Kingdom, as the mandatory Power for Palestine, and to all other Members of the United Nations the adoption and implementation, with regard to the future government of Palestine, of the Plan of Partition with Economic Union was put to a vote in the United Nations General Assembly.

The result was 33 to 13 in favour of the resolution, with 10 abstentions. Resolution 181(II): PART I: Future constitution and government of Palestine: A. TERMINATION OF MANDATE, PARTITION AND INDEPENDENCE: Clause 3 provides:

Independent Arab and Jewish States and the Special International Regime for the City of Jerusalem, ... shall come into existence in Palestine two months after the evacuation of the armed forces of the mandatory Power has been completed but in any case not later than 1 October 1948.

The Arab countries (all of which had opposed the plan) proposed to query the International Court of Justice on the competence of the General Assembly to partition a country, but the resolution was rejected.

=== Drafting the text ===
The first draft of the declaration was made by Zvi Berenson, the legal advisor of the Histadrut trade union and later a Justice of the Supreme Court, at the request of Pinchas Rosen. A revised second draft was made by three lawyers, Mordechai Baham, Uri Yadin and Zvi Eli Baker, and was framed by a committee including David Remez, Pinchas Rosen, Haim-Moshe Shapira, Moshe Sharett and Aharon Zisling. A second committee meeting, which included David Ben-Gurion, Yehuda Leib Maimon, Sharett and Zisling produced the final text.

=== Palestinian Arab perspectives and ongoing conflict ===
Palestinian Arabs were largely excluded from the drafting process and viewed the declaration as a unilateral decision over the sovereignty of the territory they inhabited. They considered the UN Partition Plan unfair, both because it denied their right to self-determination, and because it gave a significant portion of the land to a Jewish state despite the Arab population being the majority. Consequently, Arab leaders and communities opposed the plan, stating they would not support any scheme that "provided for the dissection, segregation or partition of their country". This exclusion and denial of political rights contributed to rising tensions, and ultimately, conflict and the 1948 war.

=== Minhelet HaAm Vote ===
On 12 May 1948, the Minhelet HaAm (Hebrew: מנהלת העם, lit. People's Administration) was convened to vote on declaring independence. Three of the thirteen members were absent, with Yehuda Leib Maimon and Yitzhak Gruenbaum being blocked in besieged Jerusalem, while Yitzhak-Meir Levin was in the United States.

The meeting started at 13:45 and ended after midnight. The decision was between accepting the American proposal for a truce, or declaring independence. The latter option was put to a vote, with six of the ten members present supporting it:

- For: David Ben-Gurion, Moshe Sharett (Mapai); Peretz Bernstein (General Zionists); Haim-Moshe Shapira (Hapoel HaMizrachi); Mordechai Bentov, Aharon Zisling (Mapam).
- Against: Eliezer Kaplan, David Remez (Mapai); Pinchas Rosen (New Aliyah Party); Bechor-Shalom Sheetrit (Sephardim and Oriental Communities).

Chaim Weizmann, the Chairman of the World Zionist Organization, and soon to be first President of Israel, endorsed the decision, after reportedly asking "What are they waiting for, the idiots?"

=== Final wording ===
The draft text was submitted for approval to a meeting of Moetzet HaAm at the JNF building in Tel Aviv on 14 May. The meeting started at 13:50 and ended at 15:00, an hour before the declaration was due to be made. Despite ongoing disagreements, members of the Council unanimously voted in favour of the final text. During the process, there were two major debates, centring on the issues of borders and religion.

==== Borders ====
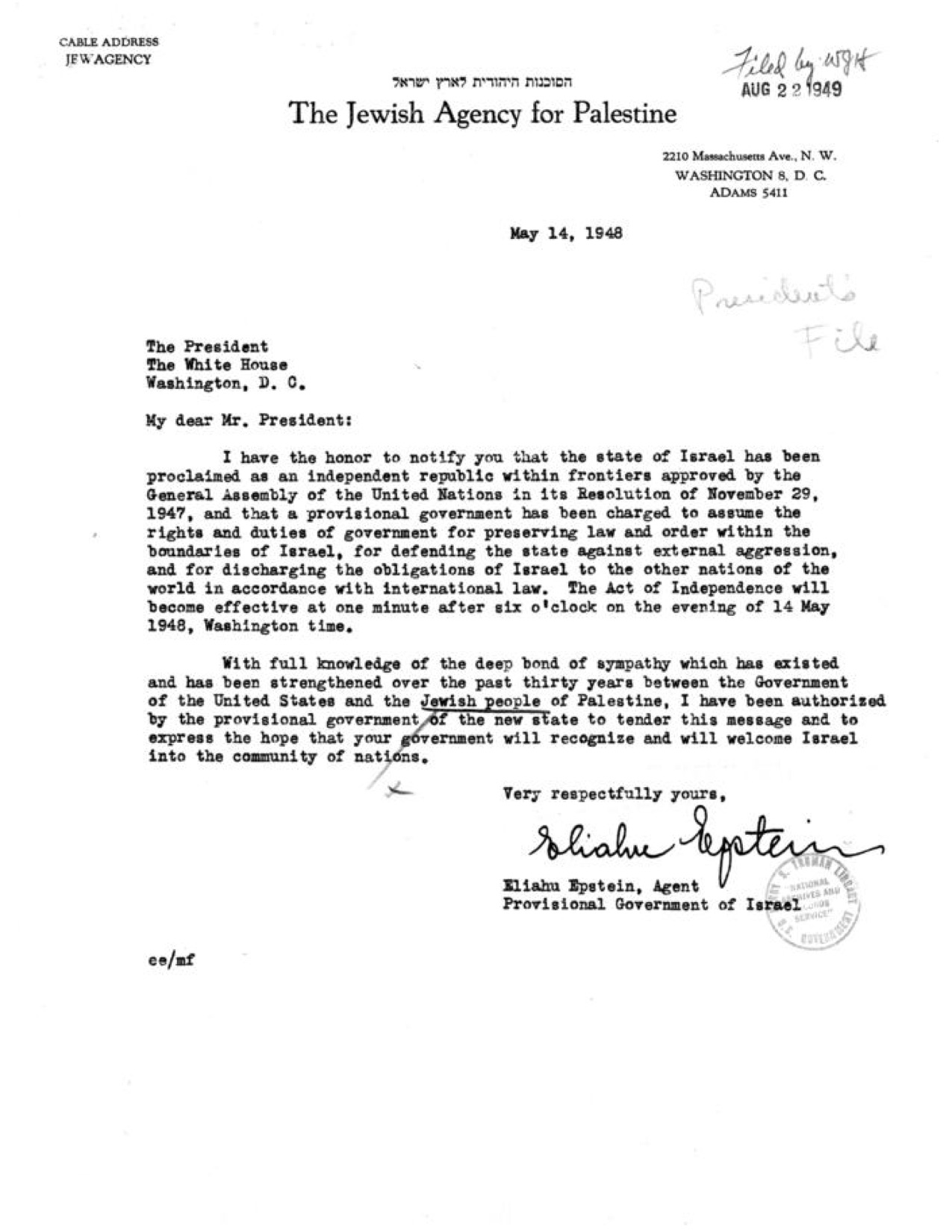
On the day of its proclamation, Eliahu Epstein wrote to Harry S. Truman that the state had been proclaimed "within the frontiers approved by the General Assembly of the United Nations in its Resolution of November 29, 1947".

The borders were not specified in the Declaration, although its 14th paragraph indicated a readiness to cooperate in the implementation of the UN Partition Plan. The original draft had declared that the borders would be decided by the UN partition plan. While this was supported by Rosen and Bechor-Shalom Sheetrit, it was opposed by Ben-Gurion and Zisling, with Ben-Gurion stating, "We accepted the UN Resolution, but the Arabs did not. They are preparing to make war on us. If we defeat them and capture western Galilee or territory on both sides of the road to Jerusalem, these areas will become part of the state. Why should we obligate ourselves to accept boundaries that in any case the Arabs don't accept?" The inclusion of the designation of borders in the text was dropped after the provisional government of Israel, the Minhelet HaAm, voted 5–4 against it. The Revisionists, committed to a Jewish state on both sides of the Jordan River (that is, including Transjordan), wanted the phrase "within its historic borders" included, but were unsuccessful.

==== Religion ====
The second major issue was over the inclusion of God in the last section of the document, with the draft using the phrase "and placing our trust in the Almighty". The two rabbis, Shapira and Yehuda Leib Maimon, argued for its inclusion, saying that it could not be omitted, with Shapira supporting the wording "God of Israel" or "the Almighty and Redeemer of Israel". It was strongly opposed by Zisling, a member of the secularist Mapam. In the end the phrase "Rock of Israel" was used, which could be interpreted as either referring to God, or the land of Eretz Israel, Ben-Gurion saying "Each of us, in his own way, believes in the 'Rock of Israel' as he conceives it. I should like to make one request: Don't let me put this phrase to a vote." Although its use was still opposed by Zisling, the phrase was accepted without a vote.

==== Name ====
The writers also had to decide on the name for the new state. Eretz Israel, Ever (from the name Eber), Judea, and Zion were all suggested, as were Ziona, Ivriya and Herzliya. Judea and Zion were rejected because, according to the partition plan, Jerusalem (Zion) and most of the Judaean Mountains would be outside the new state. Ben-Gurion put forward "Israel" and it passed by a vote of 6–3. Official documents released in April 2013 by the State Archive of Israel show that days before the establishment of the State of Israel in May 1948, officials were still debating about what the new country would be called in Arabic: Palestine (فلسطين, Filasṭīn), Zion (صهيون, Ṣahyūn) or Israel (إسرائيل, 'Isrā’īl). Two assumptions were made: "That an Arab state was about to be established alongside the Jewish one in keeping with the UN's partition resolution the year before, and that the Jewish state would include a large Arab minority whose feelings needed to be taken into account". In the end, the officials rejected the name Palestine because they thought that would be the name of the new Arab state and could cause confusion so they opted for the most straightforward option of Israel.

==== Other items ====
At the meeting on 14 May, several other members of Moetzet HaAm suggested additions to the document. Meir Vilner wanted it to denounce the British Mandate and military but Sharett said it was out of place. Meir Argov pushed to mention the Displaced Persons camps in Europe and to guarantee freedom of language. Ben-Gurion agreed with the latter but noted that Hebrew should be the main language of the state.

The debate over wording did not end completely even after the Declaration had been made. Declaration signer Meir David Loewenstein later claimed, "It ignored our sole right to Eretz Israel, which is based on the covenant of the Lord with Abraham, our father, and repeated promises in the Tanach. It ignored the aliya of the Ramban and the students of the Vilna Gaon and the Ba'al Shem Tov, and the [rights of] Jews who lived in the 'Old Yishuv'."

== Declaration ceremony ==
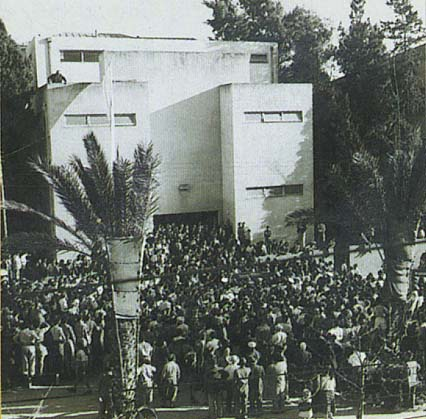
A celebratory crowd outside the Tel Aviv Museum, located in 16 Rothschild Boulevard, to hear the Declaration

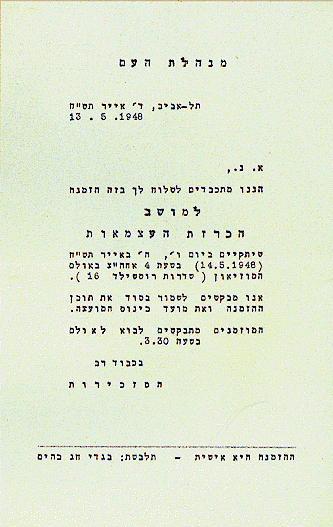
The invitation to the ceremony, dated 13 May 1948.

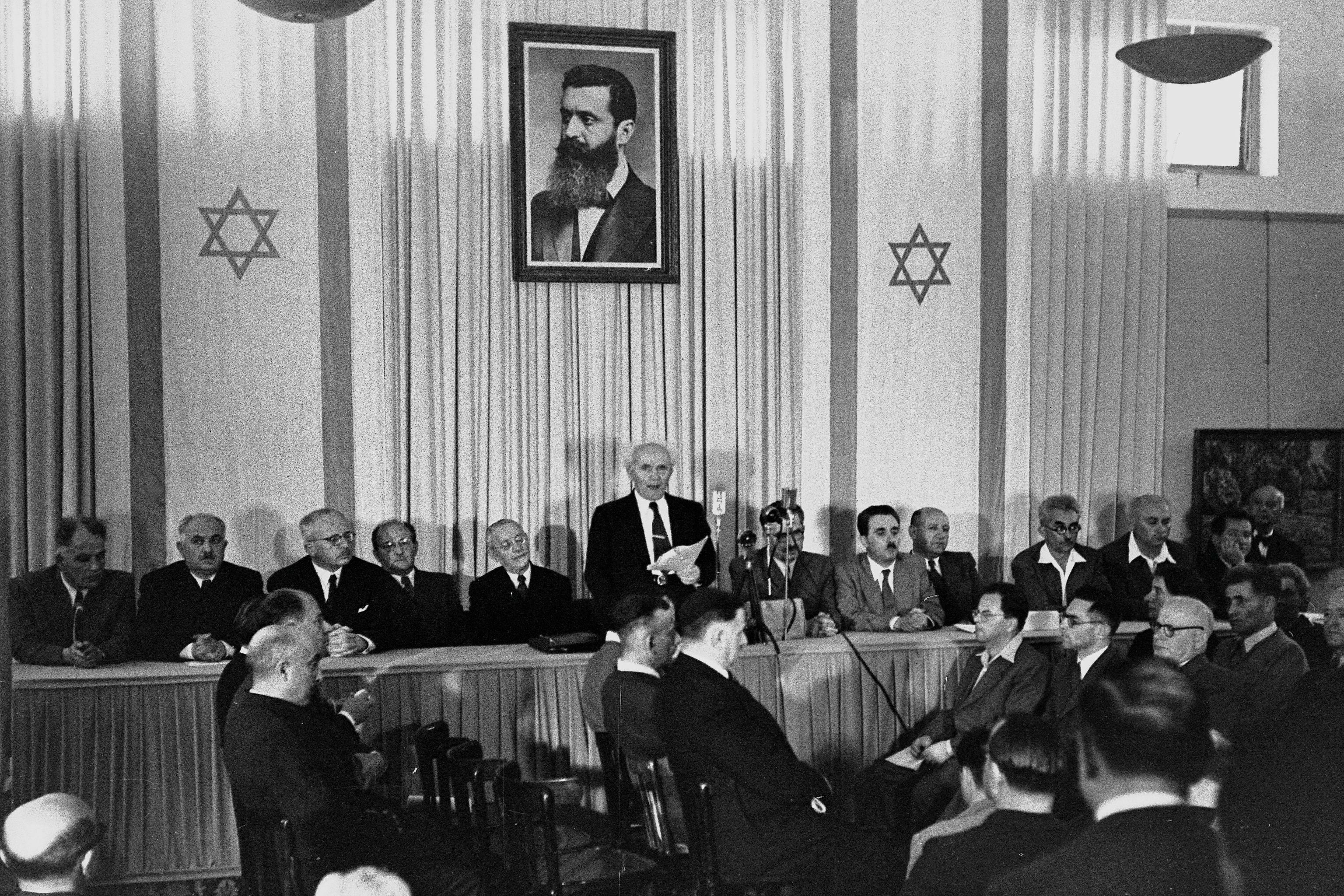
David Ben-Gurion declaring independence beneath a large portrait of Theodor Herzl, founder of modern Zionism

The ceremony was held in the Tel Aviv Museum (today known as Independence Hall) but was not widely publicised as it was feared that the British Authorities might attempt to prevent it or that the Arab armies might invade earlier than expected. An invitation was sent out by messenger on the morning of 14 May telling recipients to arrive at 15:30 and to keep the event a secret. The event started at 16:00 (a time chosen so as not to breach the sabbath) and was broadcast live as the first transmission of the new radio station Kol Yisrael.

The final draft of the declaration was typed at the Jewish National Fund building following its approval earlier in the day. Ze'ev Sherf, who stayed at the building in order to deliver the text, had forgotten to arrange transport for himself. Ultimately, he had to flag down a passing car and ask the driver (who was driving a borrowed car without a licence) to take him to the ceremony. Sherf's request was initially refused but he managed to persuade the driver to take him. The car was stopped by a policeman for speeding while driving across the city though a ticket was not issued after it was explained that he was delaying the declaration of independence. Sherf arrived at the museum at 15:59.

At 16:00, Ben-Gurion opened the ceremony by banging his gavel on the table, prompting a spontaneous rendition of Hatikvah, soon to be Israel's national anthem, from the 250 guests. On the wall behind the podium hung a picture of Theodor Herzl, the founder of modern Zionism, and two flags, later to become the official flag of Israel.

After telling the audience "I shall now read to you the scroll of the Establishment of the State, which has passed its first reading by the National Council", Ben-Gurion proceeded to read out the declaration, taking 16 minutes, ending with the words "Let us accept the Foundation Scroll of the Jewish State by rising" and calling on Rabbi Fishman to recite the Shehecheyanu blessing.

=== Signatories ===
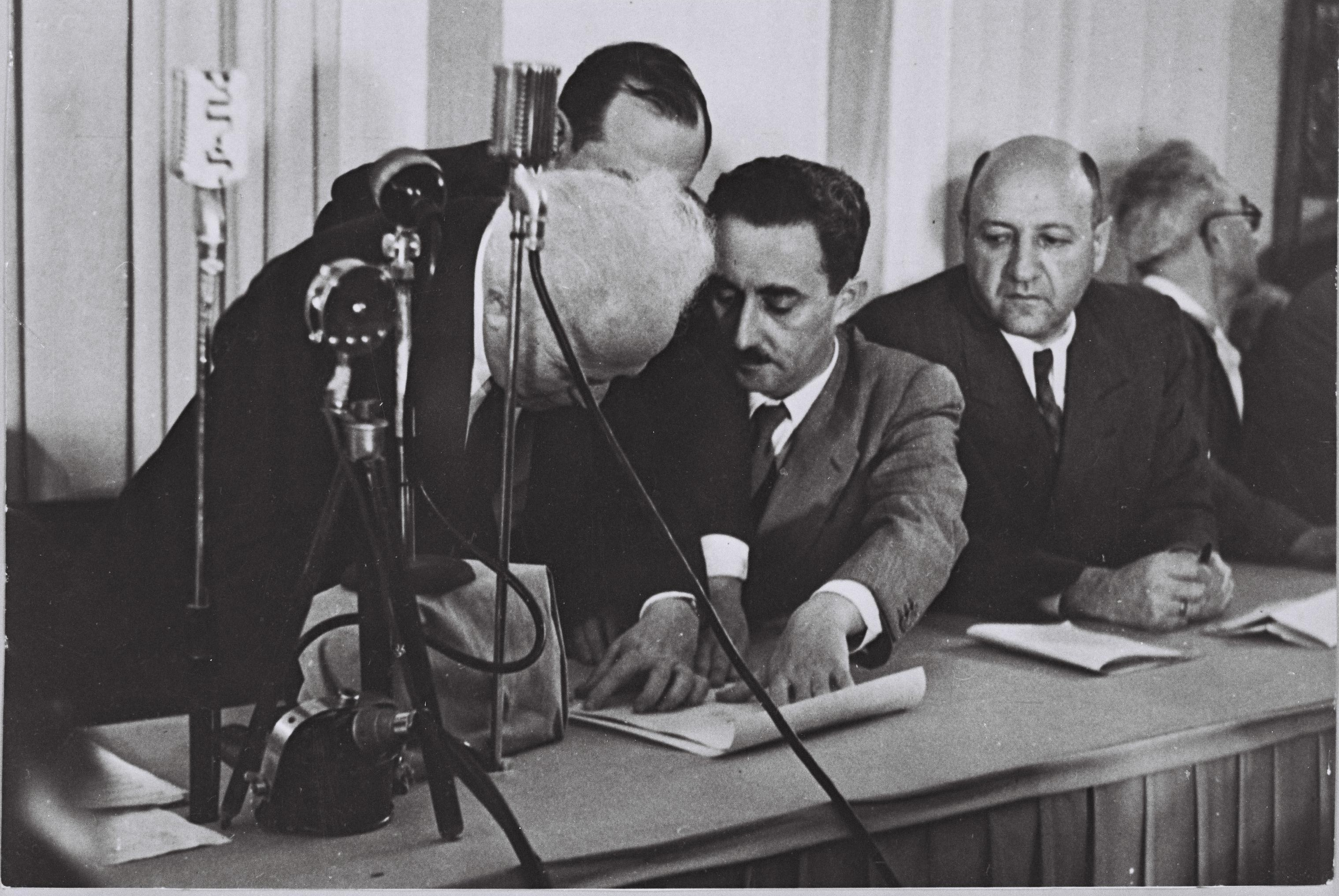
Ben Gurion (left) signing the Declaration of Independence held by Moshe Sharett

As leader of the Yishuv, David Ben-Gurion was the first person to sign. The declaration was due to be signed by all 37 members of Moetzet HaAm. However, twelve members could not attend, with eleven of them trapped in besieged Jerusalem and one abroad. The remaining 25 signatories present were called up in alphabetical order to sign, leaving spaces for those absent. Although a space was left for him between the signatures of Eliyahu Dobkin and Meir Vilner, Zerach Warhaftig signed at the top of the next column, leading to speculation that Vilner's name had been left alone to isolate him, or to stress that even a communist had agreed with the declaration. However, Warhaftig later denied this, stating that a space had been left for him (as he was one of the signatories trapped in Jerusalem) where a Hebraicised form of his name would have fitted alphabetically, but he insisted on signing under his actual name so as to honour his father's memory and so moved down two spaces. He and Vilner would be the last surviving signatories, and remained close for the rest of their lives. Of the signatories, two were women (Golda Meir and Rachel Cohen-Kagan).

When Herzl Rosenblum, a journalist, was called up to sign, Ben-Gurion instructed him to sign under the name Herzl Vardi, his pen name, as he wanted more Hebrew names on the document. Although Rosenblum acquiesced to Ben-Gurion's request and legally changed his name to Vardi, he later admitted to regretting not signing as Rosenblum. Several other signatories later Hebraised their names, including Meir Argov (Grabovsky), Peretz Bernstein (then Fritz Bernstein), Avraham Granot (Granovsky), Avraham Nissan (Katznelson), Moshe Kol (Kolodny), Yehuda Leib Maimon (Fishman), Golda Meir (Meyerson/Myerson), Pinchas Rosen (Felix Rosenblueth) and Moshe Sharett (Shertok). Other signatories added their own touches, including Saadia Kobashi who added the phrase "HaLevy", referring to the tribe of Levi.

After Sharett, the last of the signatories, had put his name to paper, the audience again stood and the Israel Philharmonic Orchestra played "Hatikvah". Ben-Gurion concluded the event with the words "The State of Israel is established! This meeting is adjourned!" The 37 signatories were:

- David Ben-Gurion
- Daniel Auster
- Yitzhak Ben-Zvi
- Mordechai Bentov
- Eliyahu Berligne
- Fritz Bernstein
- Rachel Cohen-Kagan
- Eliyahu Dobkin
- Yehuda Leib Fishman
- Wolf Gold
- Meir Grabovsky
- Avraham Granovsky
- Yitzhak Gruenbaum
- Kalman Kahana
- Eliezer Kaplan
- Avraham Katznelson
- Saadia Kobashi
- Moshe Kol
- Yitzhak-Meir Levin
- Meir David Loewenstein
- Zvi Lurie
- Golda Meyerson
- Nahum Nir
- David-Zvi Pinkas
- Felix Rosenblueth
- David Remez
- Berl Repetur
- Zvi Segal
- Mordechai Shatner
- Ben-Zion Sternberg
- Bechor-Shalom Sheetrit
- Haim-Moshe Shapira
- Moshe Shertok
- Herzl Vardi
- Meir Vilner
- Zerach Warhaftig
- Aharon Zisling

== Aftermath ==
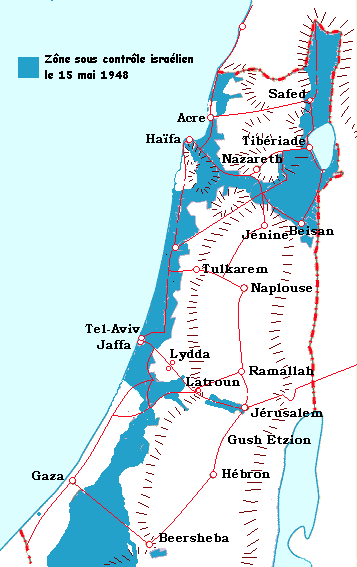
Israeli-controlled territories on 15 May 1948, the day after Israel declared independence.

The declaration was made in the first phase of the civil war between the Arab and Jewish populations of the Mandate that had started the day after the partition vote at the UN six months earlier. Neighbouring Arab states and the Arab League were opposed to the vote and had declared they would intervene to prevent its implementation. In a cablegram on 15 May 1948 to the Secretary-General of the United Nations, the Secretary-General of the League of Arab States stated that the Arab states were intervening to restore order and to prevent further bloodshed.

On 15 May 1948, forces from Egypt, Trans-Jordan, Iraq, and Syria entered the territory of the former Mandate, beginning the first phase of the 1948 Arab–Israeli War. A truce began on 11 June, but fighting resumed on 8 July and stopped again on 18 July, before restarting in mid-October and finally ending on 24 July 1949 with the signing of the armistice agreement with Syria. Israel retained its independence and increased its controlled land area by almost 50% more than what had been allocated to it under the 1947 UN Partition Plan.

The war also resulted in a large displacement of the Arab population of Palestine. During the events Palestinians commemorate as the Nakba (catastrophe), over 700,000 Palestinian Arabs fled, left, or were expelled from areas that became Israel, making them into refugees. Zionist militias and Israeli forces destroyed or depopulated over 530 Palestinian towns and villages, and at least 15,000 Palestinians were killed across dozens of documented massacres. Most Palestinian refugees were not allowed to return to their homes after the war, and many settled in Gaza, the West Bank, and neighbouring Arab countries such as Lebanon, Syria and Jordan.

The depopulation of Palestinian communities and the displacement of more than 80% of the Arab population of the territory that became Israel had large effects for the region. Many of these depopulated sites were later repopulated by Jewish immigrants and renamed, while others remained abandoned or in ruins. The Nakba remains a central event in Palestinian historical memory and national identity.

Following the declaration, Moetzet HaAm became the Provisional State Council, which acted as the legislative body for the new state until the first elections in January 1949.

Many of the signatories would play a prominent role in Israeli politics following independence; Moshe Sharett and Golda Meir both served as Prime Minister, Yitzhak Ben-Zvi became the country's second president in 1952, and several others served as ministers. David Remez was the first signatory to pass away, dying in May 1951, while Meir Vilner, the youngest signatory at just 29, was the longest living, serving in the Knesset until 1990 and dying in June 2003. Eliyahu Berligne, the oldest signatory at 82, died in 1959.

Eleven minutes after midnight, the United States de facto recognised the State of Israel. This was followed by Iran (which had voted against the UN partition plan), Guatemala, Iceland, Nicaragua, Romania, and Uruguay. The Soviet Union was the first nation to fully recognise Israel de jure on 17 May 1948, followed by Poland, Czechoslovakia, Yugoslavia, Ireland, and South Africa. The United States extended official recognition after the first Israeli election, as Truman had promised on 31 January 1949. By virtue of General Assembly Resolution 273 (III), Israel was admitted to membership in the United Nations on 11 May 1949.

In the three years following the 1948 Palestine war, about 700,000 Jews immigrated to Israel, residing mainly along the borders and in former Arab lands. Around 136,000 were some of the 250,000 displaced Jews of World War II. And from the 1948 Arab–Israeli War until the early 1970s, 800,000–1,000,000 Jews left, fled, or were expelled from their homes in Arab countries; 260,000 of them reached Israel between 1948 and 1951; and 600,000 by 1972.

== Status in Israeli law ==
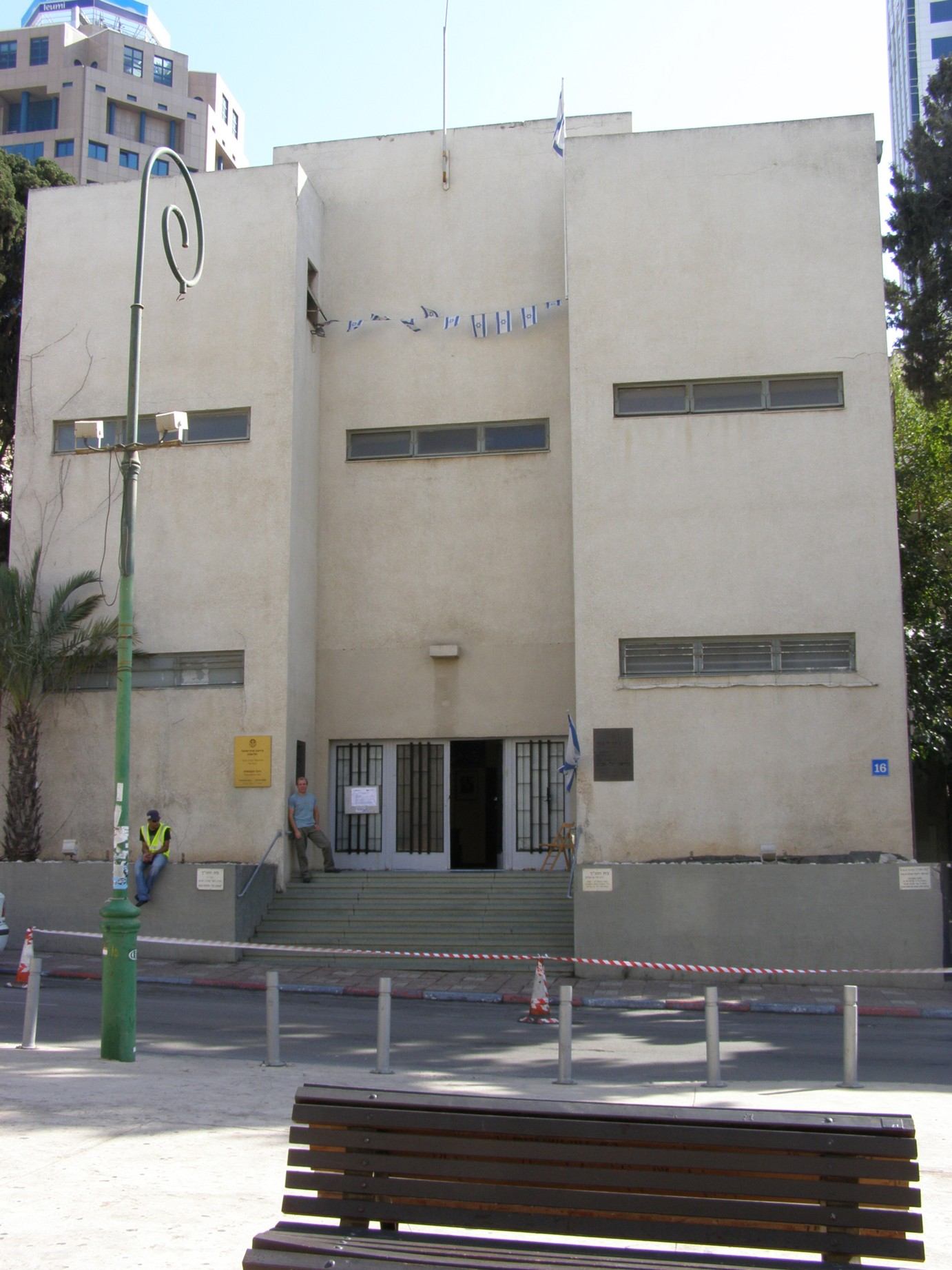
Independence Hall as it appeared in 2007

Paragraph 13 of the Declaration provides that the State of Israel would be based on freedom, justice and peace as envisaged by the prophets of Israel; it will ensure complete equality of social and political rights to all its inhabitants irrespective of religion, race or sex;. However, the Knesset maintains that the declaration is neither a law nor an ordinary legal document. The Supreme Court has ruled that the guarantees were merely guiding principles, and that the declaration is not a constitutional law making a practical ruling on the upholding or nullification of various ordinances and statutes.

In 1994 the Knesset amended two basic laws, Human Dignity and Liberty and Freedom of Occupation, introducing (among other changes) a statement saying "the fundamental human rights in Israel will be honored (...) in the spirit of the principles included in the declaration of the establishment of the State of Israel."

== Status in International law ==
The international legal significance of the declaration has been the subject of scholars discussion. The declaration has cited Resolution 181 as among its legal basis for the establishment of the State of Israel. However, legal scholars have disputed the legal authority of the resolution.

Legal scholar Henry Cattan pointed out that the Mandate for Palestine was a form of trusteeship that was intended to guide the territory toward self-government and independence, rather than to vest sovereignty into the Mandatory Power. On this view, Cattan argued that neither the United Kingdom nor the United Nations acquired sovereignty over Palestine under the Mandate and therefore lacked the legal authority to dispose of the territory or transfer the sovereignty either to itself or to another entity. Cattan further argued that even if Israel were to keep 57% of Palestine under a specific UN agreement, Palestinians still legally owns the sovereignty of that entire land and that neither a United Nations resolution nor Israeli military occupation or annexation can legally extinguish the original sovereign rights.

The criticism may be made that while the implementation of the territorial provisions of the resolution effaces Israel's usurpation of territory seized in excess of the boundaries it fixed for the Jewish State, it would still leave in Israel's hands 57% of the territory of Palestine. Such criticism, however, is attenuated by the fact that Palestinian sovereignty remains over such territory, since neither a United Nations resolution, nor Israeli occupation or annexation, can divest the Palestinians of their sovereignty. The right of sovereignty is inalienable and imprescriptible and survives aggression, occupation and annexation.

— Henry Cattan

Legal scholars Ian Brownlie and Elihu Lauterpacht similarly argued that the United Nations General Assembly lacked legal authority to transfer sovereignty over Palestine through Resolution 181. Brownlie argued that the United Nations General Assembly lacked the legal authority to transfer sovereignty over Palestine through Resolution 181, as it was not itself a sovereign authority. Brownlie further argued that an inhabited territory cannot be regarded as terra nullius (territory belonging to no sovereign) and that, upon termination of a mandate, sovereignty must remain legally located rather than being extinguished or be "susceptible to appropriation by individual states". Lauterpacht likewise argued that Resolution 181 could not, by itself, create new territorial rights, and that any such rights would have to arise from other legal sources, such as agreements, state practice, or subsequent events.

== The scroll ==
Although Ben-Gurion had told the audience that he was reading from the scroll of independence, he was actually reading from handwritten notes because only the bottom part of the scroll had been finished by artist and calligrapher Otte Wallish by the time of the declaration (he did not complete the entire document until June). The scroll, which is bound together in three parts, is generally kept in the country's National Archives.

== See also ==
- Churchill White Paper – 1922 British Policy in Palestine
- 1929 Palestine riots – Arab–Jewish clashes in Mandatory Palestine
- Passfield white paper
- White Paper of 1939 – British policy paper regarding Palestine
- The Recording of the Israel Declaration of Independence
- Palestinian Declaration of Independence – 1988 statement that formally established the State of Palestine
- Independence Day (Israel) – Public holiday
- List of international declarations
