= Ministry of Justice (Israel) =

Government ministry of Israel

- משרד המשפטים
- Ministry emblem

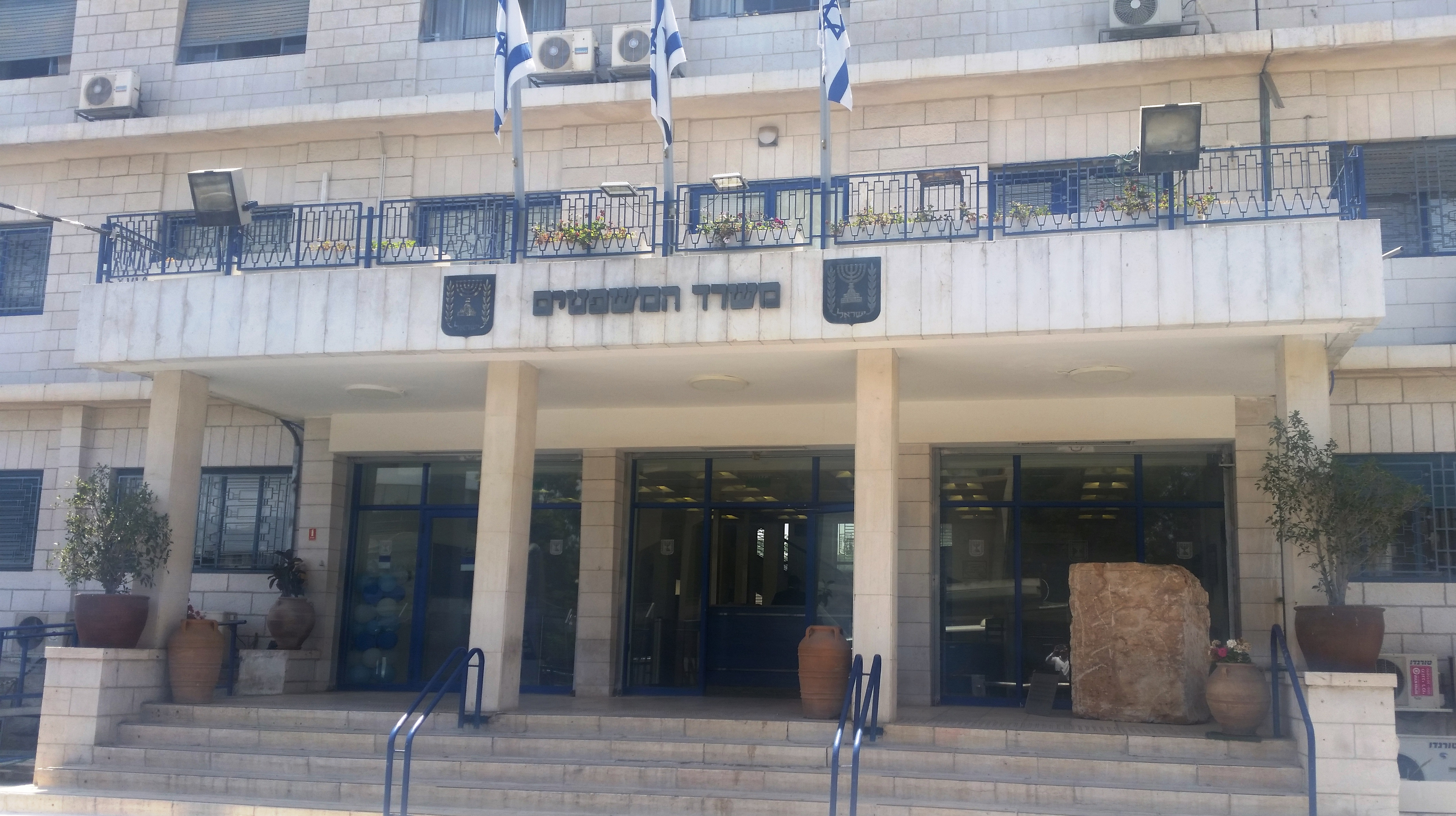

Agency overview
- Formed: 1948
- Jurisdiction: Government of Israel
- Minister responsible: Yariv Levin
- Agency executive: Itamar Donenfeld, Director-General
- Website: www.justice.gov.il

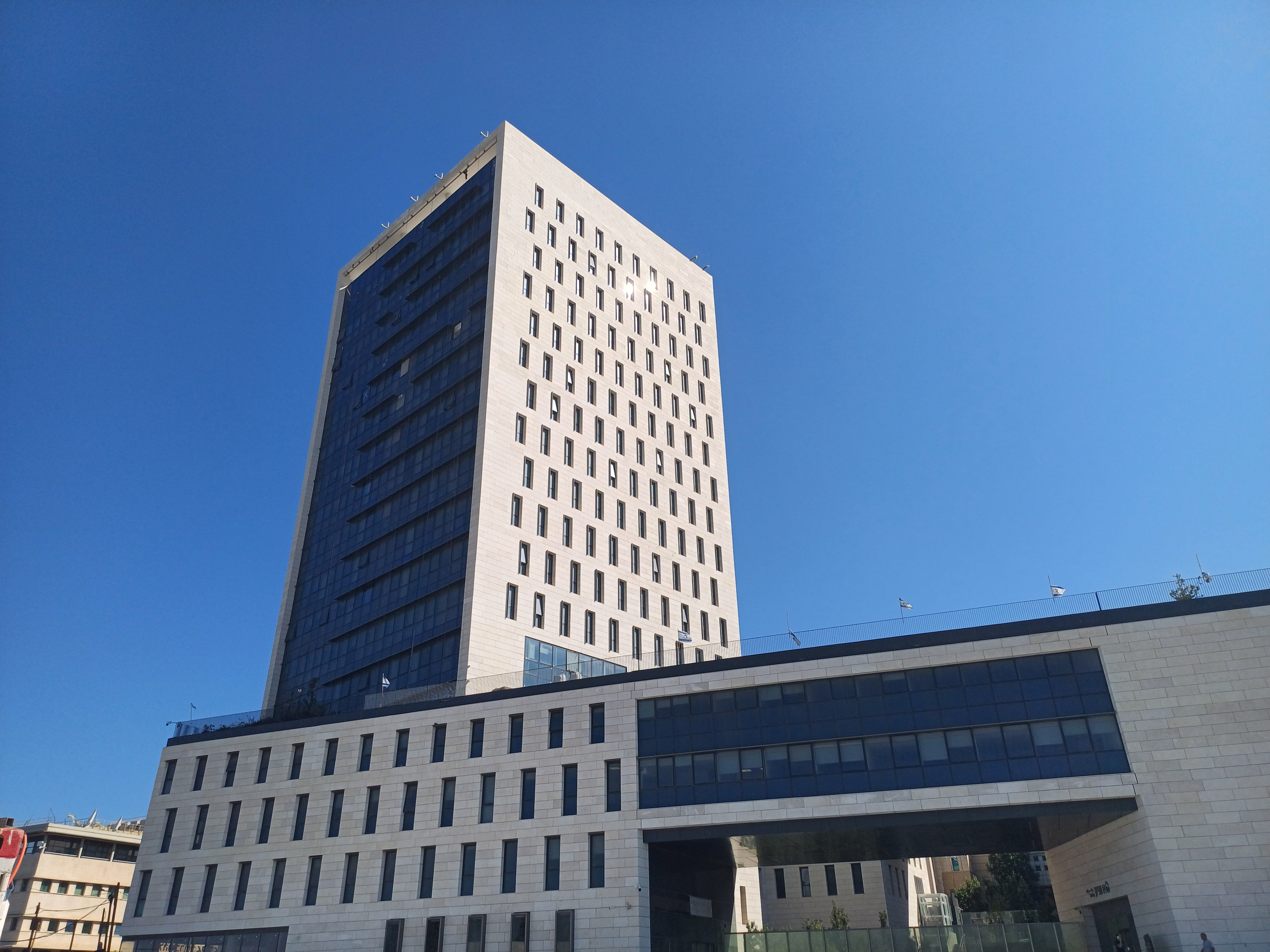
Ministry of Justice building in Givat Ram in 2024

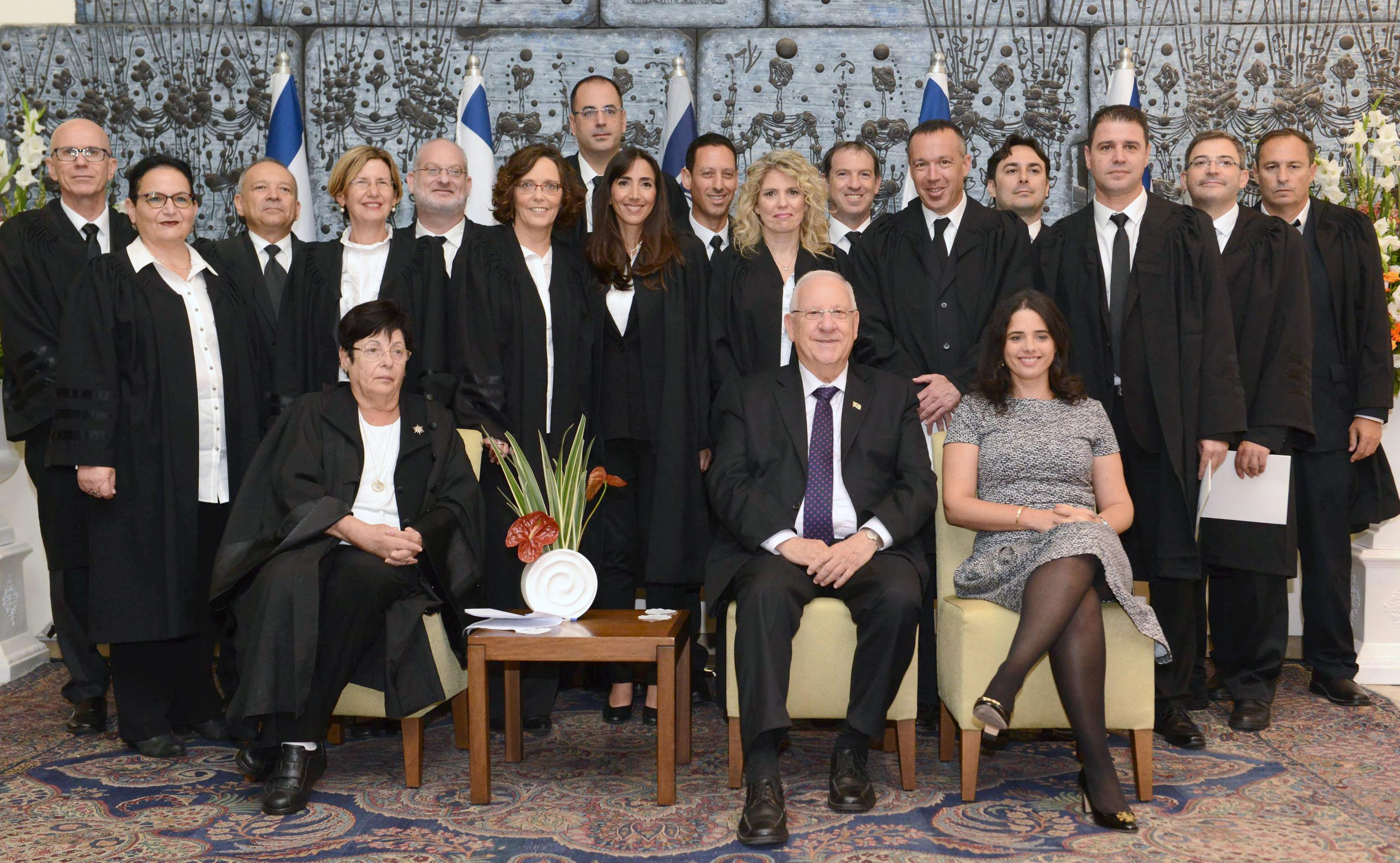
Judicial swearing-in ceremony in 2015

The Ministry of Justice (Hebrew: מִשְׂרָד הַמִשְׁפָּטִים, Misrad HaMishpatim; Arabic: وزارة العدل) is the Israeli government ministry that oversees the Israeli judicial system.

== History ==
The office was established with the establishment of the Provisional Government in 1948. The first minister who headed it was Pinchas Rosen, and at the beginning of his career he had only three employees. The first goal of the office was to create continuity in the activity of the essential legal institutions during the transition period from British rule. In particular, there was a need to fill the positions of judges in the courts, as the British and Arab judges left. The appointment of the first judges of the Supreme Court in its incarnation as an Israeli court was approved by the Provisional Government and the Provisional Council of State in July of that year. In 1948, the Office of the General Custodian was also staffed.

Another goal that stood before the eyes of the heads of the ministry in the early years of the State of Israel was the formation of Israeli laws that would replace the Ottoman and Mandatory legal systems. However, the connection to British law was severed only in 1980, with the enactment of the Law on the Foundations of Law, which repealed a section of the Palestine Order in Council of 1922 that stated that where provisions were not established in the local law, the courts would rule according to English common law and the rules of equity; the new law instead directs courts to rule according to the doctrines of Mishpat Ivri (non-religious aspects of the Halakha). Also, even nowadays, more than 70 years after the establishment of the State of Israel, laws enacted by the mandatory legislature or new versions of such laws (such as the Torts Ordinance, the Evidence Ordinance or the Municipalities Ordinance) remain in force. The last piece of Ottoman legislation, the Mecelle, was abolished in 1984.

In 1949 the office consisted of three main departments: consulting, legislation and advocacy. The office also included the administrative departments: land registrar, general guardian and general registrar. 506 employees worked in the office. In April 1949, the prosecutor's office and the general registrar moved to Jerusalem.

== Structure ==
- The Office of the State Attorney
- Israel Money Laundering and Terror Financing Prohibition Authority
- Freedom Of Information Unit
- Commission for Equal Rights of Persons with Disabilities
- The Population and migration Tribunals
- Israeli Corporations Authority
- Public Information Unit (Freedom of Information)
- Department of Policy Planning and Strategy
- Land Registry and Settlement of Rights
- Legal Aid
- Privacy Protection Council
- The Internal Audit Regulatory Unit
- The Guardian General and Director of Inheritance Affairs
- The Anti-Racism Coordinating Government Unit
- The Commissioner of Business Service Providers
- The Inspector for Complaints Against the Israel Security Agency (ISA) Interrogators
- The Ombudsman of the State Representatives in the Courts
- The Regulation of Professions Division
- Public Defense
- The Real Estate Valuation Division (The Government Appraiser)
- The Sharia Courts
- Ombudsman of the Israeli Judiciary
- Israel Patent Office
- Foreign Relations Unit
- Finance Department
- Digital Technologies & Information
- Internal Auditing

== Office of the State Attorney ==
The Office of the State Attorney constitutes a part of the law enforcement system, representating the State before the courts. The Office of the State Attorney is headed by the State Attorney and is subject to the Attorney General's directives. The State Attorney has four deputies: Criminal Matters Deputy, Civil Matters Deputy, Economic Enforcement Deputy and Special Matters Deputy.

== List of ministers ==
The Minister of Justice (Hebrew: שַׂר הַמִשְׁפָּטִים, Sar HaMishpatim) is the political head of the ministry. Unlike other ministries, there has never been a Deputy Minister.

#	Minister	Party	Government	Term start	Term end	Notes
1	Pinchas Rosen	Progressive Party	P, 1, 2	14 May 1948	8 October 1951	
2	Dov Yosef	Mapai	3	8 October 1951	25 June 1952	
3	Haim Cohn	Not an MK	3	25 June 1952	24 December 1952	
–	Pinchas Rosen	Progressive Party	4, 5, 6, 7	24 December 1952	13 February 1956	
4	David Ben-Gurion	Mapai	7	13 February 1956	28 February 1956	Serving Prime Minister
–	Pinchas Rosen	Progressive Party, Liberal Party	7, 8, 9	28 February 1956	2 November 1961	
–	Dov Yosef	Mapai	10, 11, 12	2 November 1961	12 January 1966	
5	Ya'akov Shimshon Shapira	Mapai	13, 14, 15	12 January 1966	13 June 1972	
–	Ya'akov Shimshon Shapira	Mapai	15	12 September 1972	1 November 1973	
6	Haim Yosef Zadok	Alignment	16, 17	10 March 1974	20 June 1977	
7	Menachem Begin	Likud	18	20 June 1977	24 October 1977	Serving Prime Minister
8	Shmuel Tamir	Democratic Movement for Change	18	20 June 1977	5 August 1980	
9	Moshe Nissim	Likud	18, 19, 20, 21	13 August 1980	16 April 1986	
10	Yitzhak Moda'i	Likud	21	16 April 1986	23 July 1986	
11	Avraham Sharir	Likud	21, 22	30 July 1986	22 December 1988	
12	Dan Meridor	Likud	23, 24	22 December 1988	13 July 1992	
13	David Libai	Labor	25, 26	13 July 1992	18 June 1996	
14	Yaakov Neeman	Not an MK	27	18 June 1996	10 August 1996	
15	Benjamin Netanyahu	Likud	27	18 June 1996	4 September 1996	Serving Prime Minister
16	Tzachi Hanegbi	Likud	27	4 September 1996	6 July 1999	
17	Yossi Beilin	One Israel	28	6 July 1999	7 March 2001	
18	Meir Sheetrit	Likud	29	7 March 2001	28 February 2003	
19	Tommy Lapid	Shinui	30	28 February 2003	4 December 2004	
20	Tzipi Livni	Likud, Kadima	30	5 December 2004	4 May 2006	
21	Haim Ramon	Kadima	31	4 May 2006	22 August 2006	
–	Meir Sheetrit	Kadima	31	23 August 2006	29 November 2006	acting
–	Tzipi Livni	Kadima	31	29 November 2006	7 February 2007	
22	Daniel Friedmann	Not an MK	31	7 February 2007	31 March 2009	
–	Yaakov Neeman	Not an MK	32	31 March 2009	18 March 2013	
–	Tzipi Livni	Hatnuah	33	18 March 2013	4 December 2014	
23	Ayelet Shaked	The Jewish Home, New Right	34	14 May 2015	2 June 2019	
24	Amir Ohana	Likud	34	5 June 2019	17 May 2020	
25	Avi Nissenkorn	Blue and White	35	17 May 2020	1 January 2021	
–	Benny Gantz	Blue and White	35	1 January 2021	1 April 2021	acting
26	Benny Gantz	Blue and White	35	28 April 2021	13 June 2021	
27	Gideon Sa'ar	New Hope	36	13 June 2021	29 December 2022	
28	Yariv Levin	Likud	37	29 December 2022		

== See also ==
- Ministry of justice
- Politics of Israel
