= Pinchas Rosen =

Israeli statesman

- פנחס רוזן
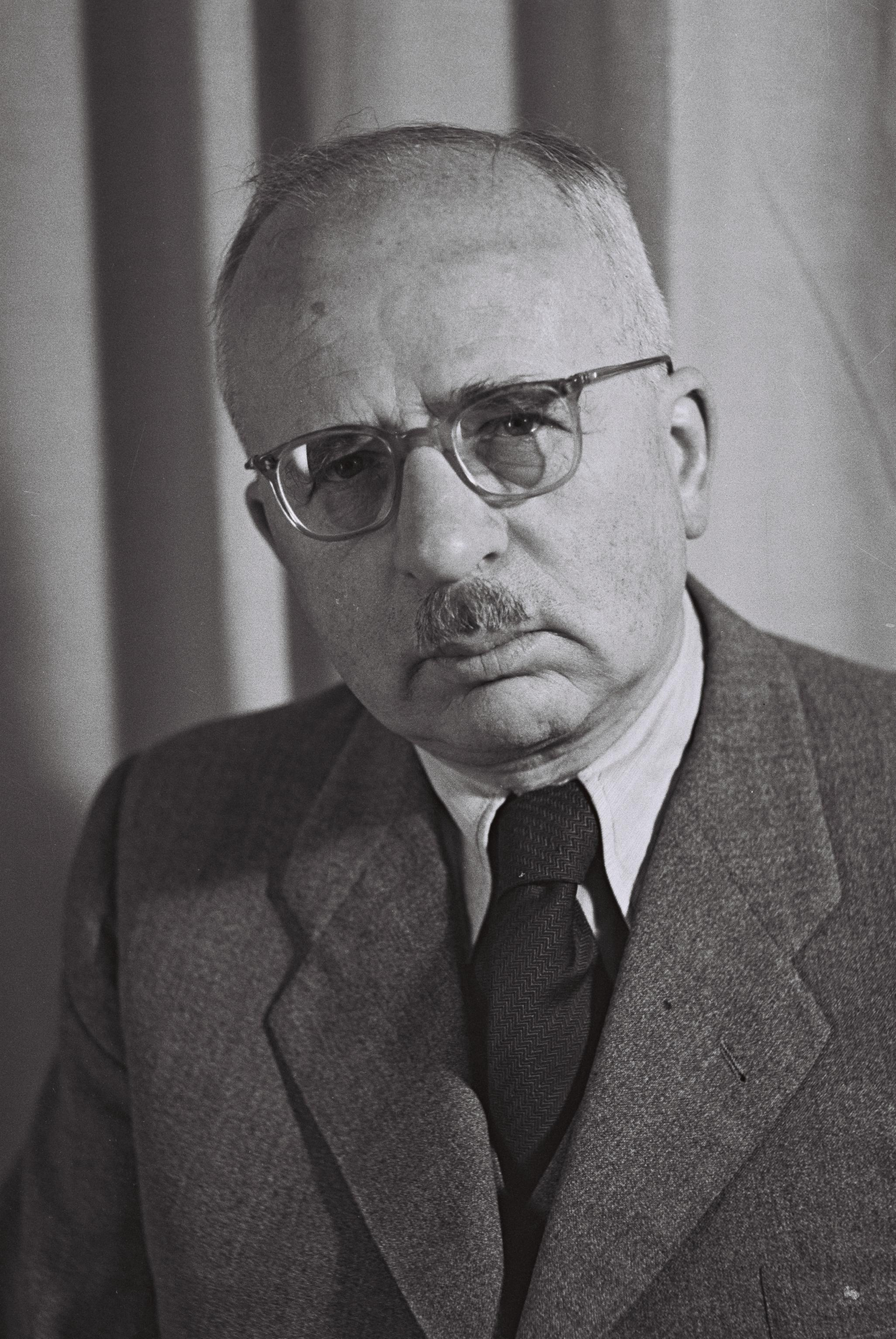

Ministerial roles
- 1948–1951: Minister of Justice
- 1952–1956: Minister of Justice
- 1956–1961: Minister of Justice

Faction represented in the Knesset
- 1949–1961: Progressive Party
- 1961–1965: Liberal Party
- 1965–1968: Independent Liberals

Personal details
- Born: Felix Pinchas Rosenblüth; 1 May 1887 Berlin, Prussia, Germany
- Died: 3 May 1978 (aged 91)

Pinchas Rosen (Hebrew: פנחס רוזן; 1 May 1887 – 3 May 1978) was a German-born Israeli statesman, and the country's first Minister of Justice, serving three times during 1948–51, 1952–56, and 1956–61. He was also leader of the Independent Liberals and three times turned down invitations to be Israel's president.

== Biography ==
Felix Pinchas Rosenblüth (later Rosen) was born in Berlin, Germany. He was brought up in Messingwerk Finow and attended the Wilhelms Gymnasium in Eberswalde from 1892 to 1904. In 1905 he left to study law at the universities of Freiburg and Berlin, graduating in 1908. He served in the Imperial German Army in World War I and was wounded in 1915 while on the Eastern Front. Always active in Zionist circles, working as chief of staff to Chaim Weizmann, Rosen was Chairman of the Zionist Federation of Germany from 1920 to 1923, and eventually migrated to Mandatory Palestine in 1926 where he practiced as a lawyer and helped create the Central European Immigrants Association.

He was also a pivotal figure in the Israel Philharmonic Orchestra.

Rosen was married three times, first to Annie Lesser with whom he had two children, Hans and Dina, who with their mother settled in London in 1933 and whom Rosen visited regularly until the end of his life. In 1935 he married Hadassah Calvary with whom he had a daughter, Rivka, who died in 1942 aged seven; Hadassah died of cancer in 1945. In 1950 he married Johanna Rosenfeld (born Ettlinger) who also predeceased him. Through his second and third wives he gained four step sons.

== Political career ==
In 1942 Rosen founded the New Aliyah Party, and was elected to the Assembly of Representatives on its list in 1944. In 1948 he was among the signatories of the Declaration of the Establishment of the State of Israel, which he had commissioned and helped create. (In 2019 Israel's Supreme Court ruled that drafts of the declaration, commissioned by Rosen from fellow-lawyer Mordechai Beham, were of national importance and State, not private, property).

In the 1949 elections, the New Aliyah Party became the Progressive Party, winning Rosen a seat in the Knesset. In 1950, when David Ben-Gurion was unable to form a coalition, the President gave the task to Rosen, as head of the Progressive Party. Rosen handed the reins to Mapai, recognizing its indispensability.

Rosen became the country's first Minister of Justice, an office to which he brought a strong reputation for intellect and probity. He retained his seat and Ministerial position in the 1951, 1955 and 1959 elections and so was Justice Minister in eight of Israel's first nine governments. He was three times offered and declined the post of President of Israel, and "Throughout his time in office, he sought to advance a progressive agenda, seeking to strip the rabbinical courts of their judicial power, and pushing, repeatedly, for Israel to adopt a constitution."

Soon after the 1959 election the Progressive Party merged with the General Zionists to form the Liberal Party. The new party won the third largest number of seats in the 1961 elections but was not invited into the coalition, and Rosen lost his ministerial position. In order to consolidate opposition to Mapai's hegemony within Israeli politics, the Liberal Party merged with Herut to form Gahal. Rosen, however, was unhappy with the merger, and led a breakaway of seven MKs to found the Independent Liberals. He was elected to the sixth Knesset but resigned from the Knesset on December 23, 1968, and retired from politics. His departure from the political stage was greeted by one newspaper as, "The end of the aristocracy" and in another by a cartoon captioned: "Another Channukah miracle! ... An MK resigns because of age."

Rosen was a long-term ally of David Ben-Gurion although their relationship was sometimes strained, not least after the Lavon affair, a botched Israeli sabotage operation in Egypt, in which Rosen sided with Lavon who had been (almost certainly falsely) accused of masterminding the mission, while Ben-Gurion wanted the embarrassing affair quietly forgotten.

On his death Pinchas Rosen received a state funeral.

== Awards ==
In 1973, Rosen was awarded the Israel Prize, in jurisprudence.

== See also ==
- List of Israel Prize recipients
