= New Aliyah Party =

New Aliyah Party עלייה חדשה
- Leader: Pinchas Rosen
- Founded: 1942
- Dissolved: 1948
- Merged into: Progressive Party
- Newspaper: Amudim
- Ideology: Liberalism
- Colors: Yellow

Election symbol
- ע

The New Aliyah Party (Hebrew: עלייה חדשה, romanized: Aliyah Hadasha, lit. 'New Immigration') was a political party in Mandatory Palestine and Israel.

== History ==
The party was established in 1942 by immigrants from Austria and Germany who had arrived in Palestine during the Fifth Aliyah. The party won 19 seats in the 1944 Assembly of Representatives elections, making it the third largest party after Mapai and the Left Bloc. The party's magazine was named Amudim (lit. Pages).

In May 1948 party leader Pinchas Rosen became a member of the provisional government. At the end of 1948 it merged with several other liberal parties, including the political arm of HaOved HaTzioni, to form the Progressive Party.
