= Jewish National Council =

Organization in Mandatory Palestine

- הוועד הלאומי

Overview
- Established: 7 October 1920
- Dissolved: 14 May 1948
- State: Yishuv, Mandatory Palestine
- Leader: David Ben-Gurion
- Responsible to: Assembly of Representatives

The Jewish National Council (JNC; Hebrew: ועד לאומי, Va'ad Le'umi), also known as the Jewish People's Council and the General Council of the Jewish Community of Palestine was the main national executive organ of the Assembly of Representatives of the Jewish community (Yishuv) within Mandatory Palestine. Its responsibilities included education, culture, local government, welfare, healthcare, religious service, security and defense. Since 1928 it was also the official representative of the Yishuv to the British Mandate government. Established in 1920, it operated until 1948, when its functions were passed to the newly established state of Israel.

== History ==
The JNC members along with Chief Rabbinate were elected on 7 October 1920 at the assembly of representatives after the 1920 election, in order to conduct Jewish communal affairs, was created along with the Assembly of Representatives, whose members selected from among themselves the members of the National Council. The first Assembly consisted of 314 elected Representatives. The first chairman of the JNC was Rabbi Abraham Isaac Kook. The Histadrut and the Haganah were also founded in 1920. Jewish communal affairs were generally conducted through a hierarchy of representative organizations, including the JNC.

The members of the JNC also participated in meetings of the Zionist General Council. The organization represented almost all major Jewish factions, however a few smaller groups at first objected to the creation of centralized leadership. Notably, Agudat Israel joined only in 1935. It was announced only in 1946 that the Sephardic Jews and the Zionist Revisionists, would stop refusing to participate in the JNC.

=== Role in the establishment of Israel ===
The Political Department of the JNC was responsible for relations with the Arabs, ties with the Jewish Agency and negotiations with the British government. As the Yishuv grew, the JNC adopted more functions, such as education, health care and welfare services, internal defense and security matters, and organized recruitment to the British forces during World War II. In the 1940s, departments for physical training, culture and press and information were added.

The report of the Anglo-American Committee of Inquiry issued in 1946, stated:

"The Jews have developed, under the aegis of the Jewish Agency and the JNC, a strong and tightly-woven community. There thus exists a virtual Jewish nonterritorial State with its own executive and legislative organs..."

When the State of Israel was established in 1948, this departmental structure served as a basis for the government ministries. On March 2, 1948, the New Jewish Council:

" Begins work on organization of Jewish provisional government"

On May 14, 1948, (the expiration day of the British Mandate), its members gathered at the Tel Aviv Museum of Art and ratified the proclamation declaring the establishment of the State of Israel. The members of the JNC formed the provisional government of the nascent State of Israel.

== Departments ==
- The Political Department
- The Education Department
- The Health Department
- The Communities Department
- The Rabbinate
- The Social Welfare Department

== Presidents ==
- 1920–1929 David Yellin
- 1929–1931 Pinhas Rutenberg
- 1931–1944 Yitzhak Ben-Zvi
- 1944–1948 David Remez

== See also ==
- History of Israel
- Jewish Agency for Israel
- Zionism
- Category:Jewish National Council members
