= Progressive Party (Israel) =

Defunct political party in Israel

Progressive Party המפלגה הפרוגרסיבית
- Leader: Pinchas Rosen
- Founded: 1948
- Dissolved: 8 May 1961
- Merger of: New Aliyah Party; HaOved HaTzioni
- Merged into: Liberal Party
- Newspaper: Zmanim
- Ideology: Liberalism (Israeli); Social liberalism Progressivism; Secularism
- Political position: Centre
- Most MKs: 6 (1959–1961)
- Fewest MKs: 4 (1951–1955)

Election symbol
- פ

The Progressive Party (Hebrew: המפלגה הפרוגרסיבית, HaMiflaga HaProgresivit) was a liberal political party in Israel.

== History ==
The Progressive Party was a liberal party, most of whose founders came from the ranks of the New Aliyah Party and HaOved HaTzioni, which had been active prior to independence. It consisted primarily of immigrants from Central Europe.

It was formed by three groups: First, and most numerous, was the mostly Central European, middle class New Aliyah Party, which generally took a liberal position on social issues. Second was HaOved HaTzioni, a non-socialist trade union in the Histadrut that rejected the idea of class struggle. Last was "group A" of the General Zionists, which was made up of artisans, small farmers, and members of the liberal professions, and which unlike "group B" was left-of-center and oriented toward the Histadrut. The Progressives favored private investment and shifting control over essential services and welfare functions from the Histadrut to the state. Although they were not socialists, they were intellectually sympathetic to socialist aspirations and open to cooperating with Mapai in a coalition government.

In the 1949 Constituent Assembly elections the party gained won seats, with Idov Cohen, Yeshayahu Forder, Avraham Granot, Yizhar Harari and Pinchas Rosen taking their place as Members of the Knesset (MKs). They joined the government as a coalition partner of David Ben-Gurion's Mapai party, and were members of both the first and second governments of Israel.

In the 1951 elections the party lost a seat and dropped to four MKs. They were not included in Ben-Gurion's original coalition, but were brought into the fourth government as a replacement for the ultra-orthodox parties Agudat Yisrael and Poalei Agudat Yisrael, who had resigned over religious education issues. They were also a coalition partner in the fifth government (created when Ben-Gurion resigned and was replaced by Moshe Sharett), but were dropped from the sixth government after a motion of no confidence had been brought against the ruling Mapai-led coalition.

The Progressive Party regained their original strength at the 1955 elections, returning to five seats, and were members both the seventh and eighth governments, headed by the returning Ben-Gurion.

Liberal International (LI) maintained contacts with both the Progressive Party and the General Zionists in the 1950s. The Progressive Party applied for affiliation at Liberal International's 1955 Lucerne congress and was accepted. This was on the condition that the Progressives would not object to the General Zionist party's affiliation when it decided to apply, which the Progressives willingly accepted (the General Zionists affiliated several years later). Yeshayahu Foerder represented the Progressive Party at the following LI congress in Stresa in 1956, and brought a draft resolution on the Israeli–Egyptian conflict. After discussion, the LI accepted the resolution without change, marking the first time the LI had voted, at the specific request of a member group, a resolution involving that group's national interest. The resolution was moderate and had been discussed with the Liberal International Executive. It called on the United Nations for greater efforts to maintain strict observance of the Middle East armistice terms and to negotiate a comprehensive settlement securing the territorial integrity of all the states involved.

In the 1959 elections the party gained another seat, their representation rising to six MKs. Again they joined Ben-Gurion's coalition. On 8 May 1961 the party merged with the General Zionists to form the Liberal Party. It was the motion of no confidence brought by the new Liberal Party and Herut that brought down the government.

The 1961 elections saw the Liberal Party become the third largest in the Knesset, though they did not join the coalition. Later in the session, the majority of the Liberal Party MKs merged with Herut to form Gahal (which later became Likud in 1973). However, the MKs that agreed with the merger were largely previous members of the General Zionists. Most former Progressive Party MKs objected to the alliance with Herut and set up the Independent Liberals instead.

== Leaders ==
| Leader | | Took office | Left office |
|---|---|---|---|
| 1 | Pinchas Rosen | 1949 | 1961 |

== Knesset election results ==
| Election | Leader | Votes | % | Place | Seats won | +/− | Status |
|---|---|---|---|---|---|---|---|
| 1949 | Pinchas Rosen | 17,786 | 4.1 | 6th | 5 / 120 | – | Coalition |
| 1951 | Pinchas Rosen | 22,171 | 3.2 | 7th | 4 / 120 | ▼3 | Opposition (1951–1952) |
| 1951 | Pinchas Rosen | 22,171 | 3.2 | 7th | 4 / 120 | ▼3 | Coalition (1952–1955) |
| 1951 | Pinchas Rosen | 22,171 | 3.2 | 7th | 4 / 120 | ▼3 | Opposition (Jun 1955–Nov 1955) |
| 1955 | Pinchas Rosen | 37,661 | 4.4 | 9th | 5 / 120 | ▲1 | Coalition |
| 1959 | Pinchas Rosen | 44,889 | 4.6 | 8th | 6 / 120 | ▲1 | Coalition |
| 1961 | Pinchas Rosen | Part of the Liberal Party | | | 10 / 120 | ▲4 | Opposition |

== See also ==
- Politics of Israel
