= First government of Israel =

1949–50 government led by David Ben-Gurion

First Ben-Gurion Cabinet
- 1st Cabinet of Israel

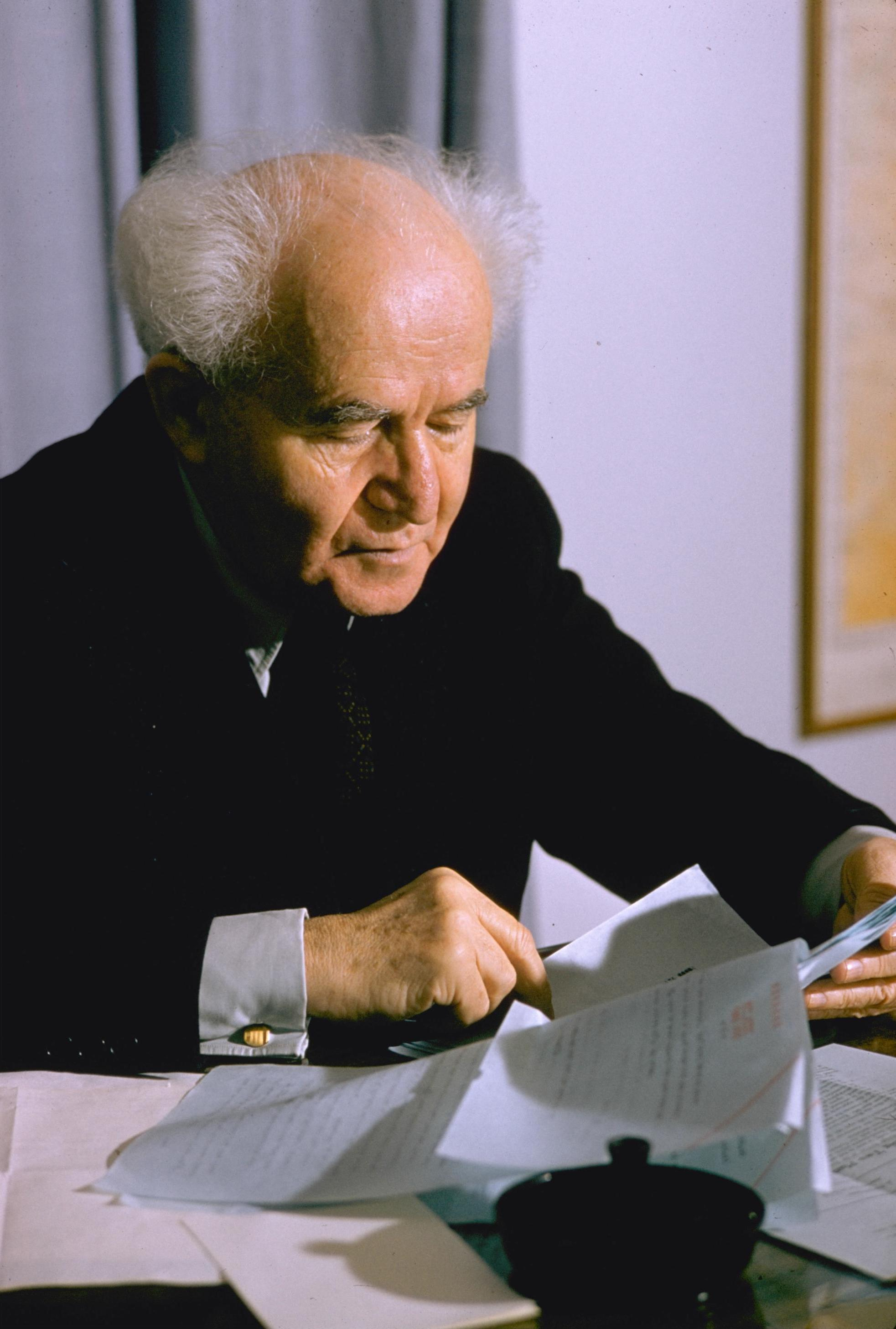
- Date formed: 10 March 1949
- Date dissolved: 30 October 1950

People and organisations
- Head of state: Chaim Weizmann
- Head of government: David Ben-Gurion
- Member parties: Mapai; United Religious Front; Progressive Party; Sephardim and Oriental Communities; Democratic List of Nazareth
- Status in legislature: Coalition
- Opposition leader: Meir Ya'ari

History
- Election: 1949 Israeli legislative election
- Legislature term: 1st Knesset
- Predecessor: Provisional cabinet of Israel
- Successor: 2nd cabinet of Israel

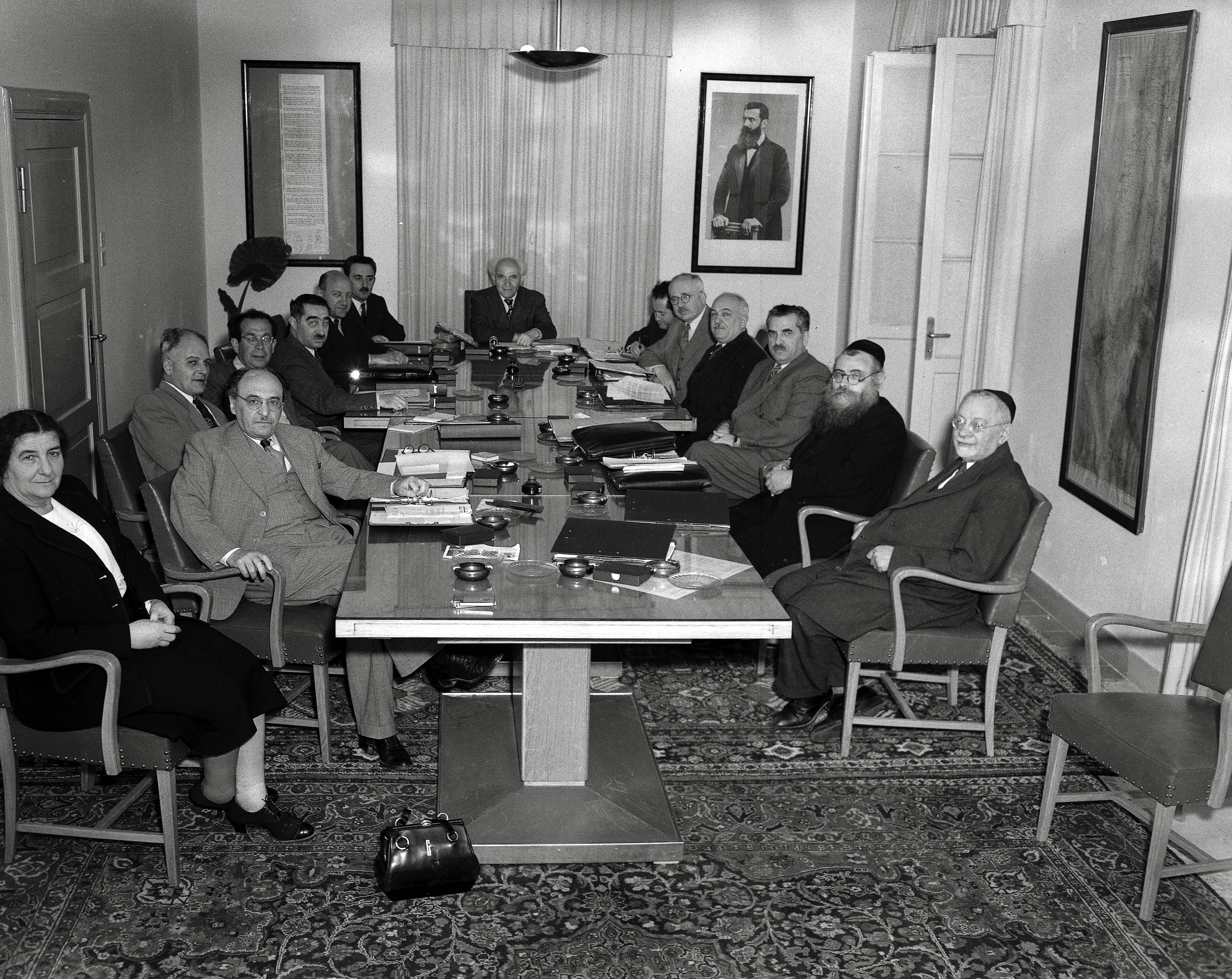
First Government of Israel on 1 May 1949. Left-right: Golda Meir, Zalman Shazar, Bechor-Shalom Sheetrit, Zvi Maimon (government stenographer), Dov Yosef, Eliezer Kaplan, Moshe Sharett, Prime Minister David Ben-Gurion, Ze'ev Sherf (cabinet secretary), Pinchas Rosen, David Remez, Haim Moshe Shapira, Yitzhak Meir Levin, Yehuda Leib Maimon.

The first government of Israel was formed by David Ben-Gurion on 8 March 1949, a month and a half after the elections for the First Knesset. His Mapai party formed a coalition with the United Religious Front, the Progressive Party, the Sephardim and Oriental Communities and the Democratic List of Nazareth, and there were 12 ministers.

== Election results ==
There were around 434,000 valid votes cast in the 1949 election.

Party name	Number of votes	Percentage	Number of seats
Mapai	155,274	35.7%	46
Mapam	64,018	14.7%	19
United Religious Front	52,982	12.2%	16
Herut Movement	49,782	11.5%	14
General Zionists	22,661	5.2%	7
Sephardim and Oriental Communities	15,287	3.5%	4
Israel Communist Party	15,148	3.5%	4
Democratic List of Nazareth	7,387	1.7%	2
Fighter's List	5,363	1.2%	1
WIZO	5,173	1.2%	1
Yemenite Association	4,399	1%	1

== Cabinet ==
First government of Israel
Portfolio	Minister	Party
Prime Minister; Minister of Defense	David Ben-Gurion	Mapai
Minister of Agriculture; Minister of Rationing and Supply	Dov Yosef	Mapai
Minister of Education and Culture	Zalman Shazar	Mapai
Minister of Foreign Affairs	Moshe Sharett	Mapai
Minister of Finance; Minister of Trade and Industry	Eliezer Kaplan	Mapai
Minister of Health; Minister of Immigration; Minister of Internal Affairs	Haim-Moshe Shapira	United Religious Front
Minister of Justice	Pinchas Rosen	Progressive Party
Minister of Labour and Social Security	Golda Meir	Mapai
Minister of Police	Bechor-Shalom Sheetrit	Sephardim and Oriental Communities
Minister of Religions and War Victims	Yehuda Leib Maimon	United Religious Front
Minister of Transportation	David Remez	Mapai
Minister of Welfare	Yitzhak-Meir Levin	United Religious Front

== History and policies ==
A notable piece of legislation enacted during the term of the first government was an educational law in 1949 which introduced compulsory schooling for all children between the ages of 5 and 14.

=== Security policy ===
One of the promises made by Mapai was to sign the 1949 Armistice Agreements, which they duly did. This laid out the foundation for the Green Line, a demarcation line set out in the agreements between the Israeli army and those of its neighbours (Egypt, Jordan, Lebanon, and Syria) after the 1948 Arab–Israeli War. It served as the de facto borders of the State of Israel from 1949 until the Six-Day War in 1967, and continues to represent Israel's internationally recognized borders with the two Palestinian territories: the West Bank and the Gaza Strip. During this government, they set out the terms for Israeli conscription.

=== Economic policy ===
During the government, austerity policies began, and oversaw a socialist distribution and rationing system. These policies largely came about as Israel had inherited the economy of Mandatory Palestine, which had operated under wartime rationing.

=== Dissolution ===
Ben-Gurion resigned on 15 October 1950 after the United Religious Front objected to his demands that the Supply and Rationing Ministry be closed and a businessman appointed as Minister for Trade and Industry, as well as issues over education in the new immigrant camps.
