= Eliezer Kaplan =

Israeli politician (1891-1952)

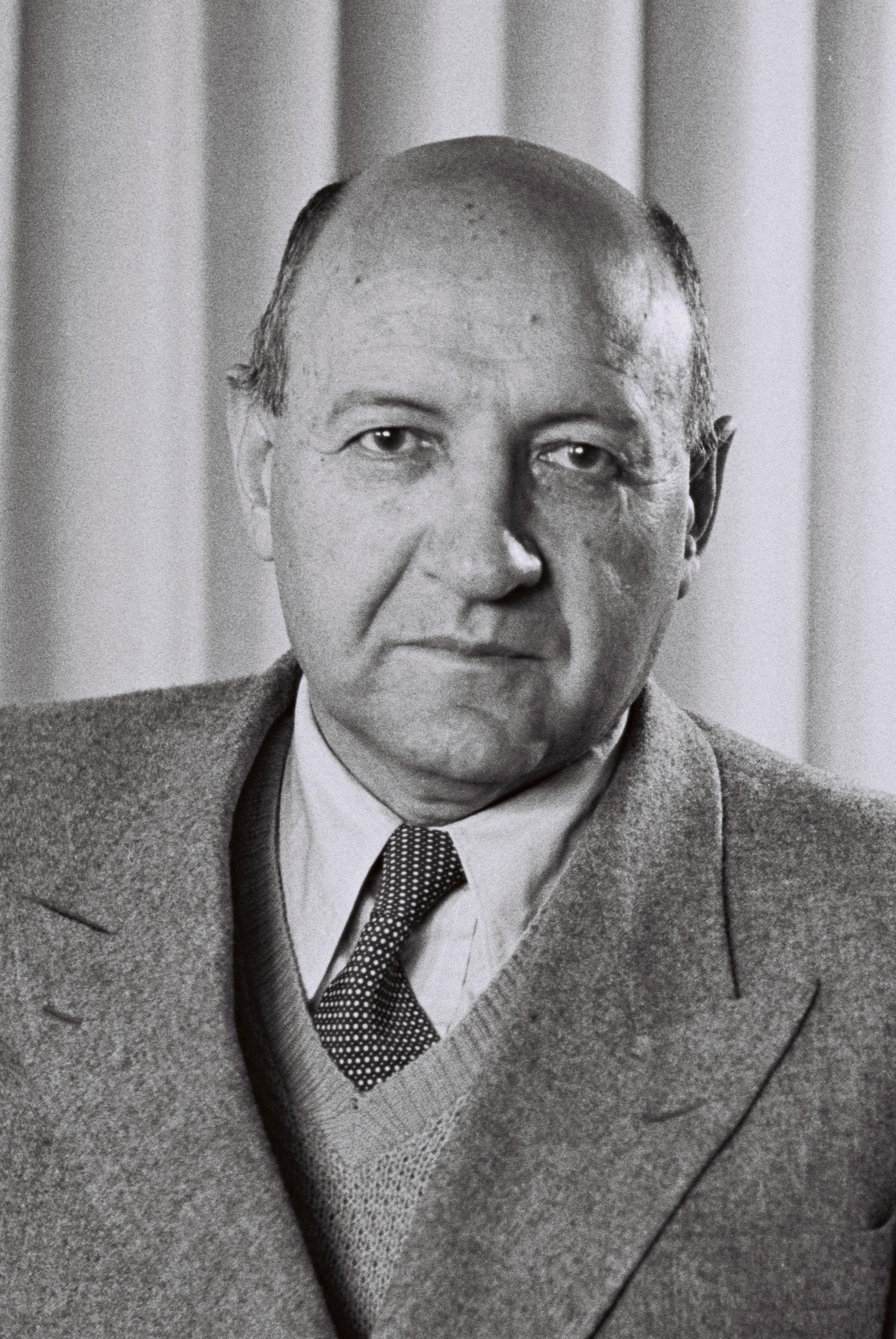
- Kaplan in 1951

Ministerial roles
- 1948–1952: Minister of Finance
- 1949–1950: Minister of Trade & Industry
- 1952: Deputy Prime Minister

Faction represented in the Knesset
- 1949–1952: Mapai

Personal details
- Born: 27 January 1891 Minsk, Russian Empire
- Died: 13 July 1952 (aged 61) Tel Aviv, Israel
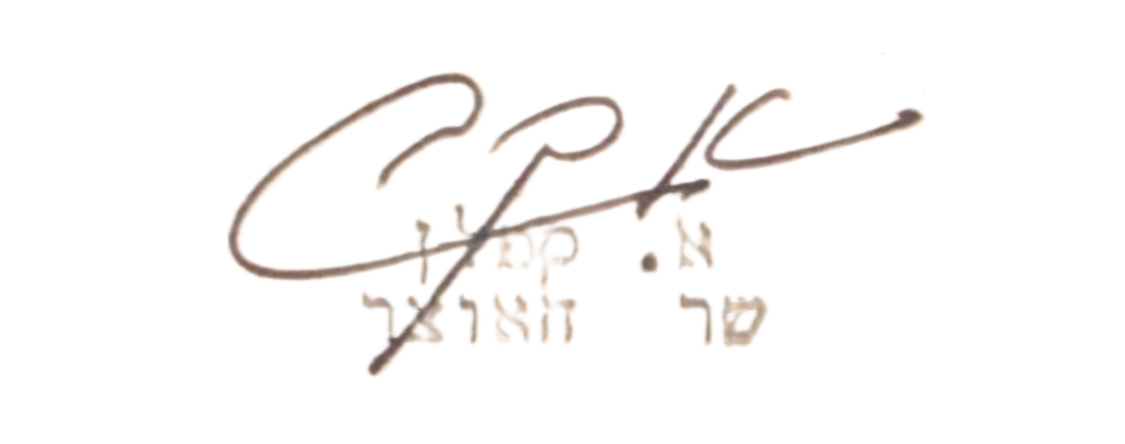
- Signature

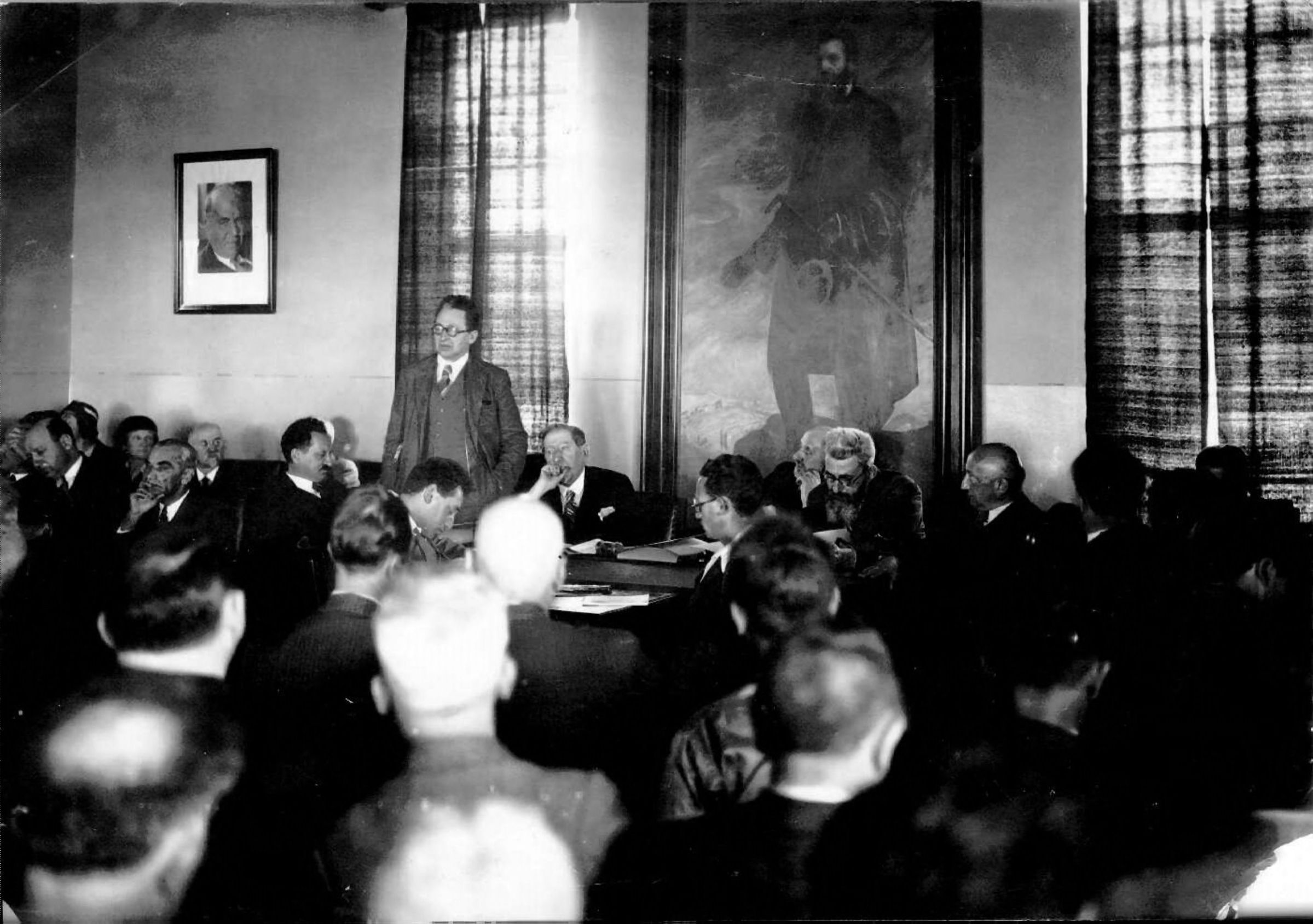
Yitzhak Ben-Zvi, Chairman of the National Committee, addresses the Zionist General Council Meeting in Jerusalem. From right to left: I. Rupaisen, Ben-Zion Mossinson, H. Farbstein, Nahum Sokolow, Yitzhak Ben-Zvi, Yosef Sprinzak, I. L. Goldberg, Shmaryahu Levin, Eliezer Kaplan (1935)

Eliezer Kaplan (Hebrew: אליעזר קפלן; Belarusian: Эліэзер Каплан; 27 January 1891 – 13 July 1952) was a Zionist activist, Israeli politician, one of the signatories of the Israeli declaration of independence and the country's first Minister of Finance and Deputy Prime Minister.

== Biography ==
Born in Minsk in the Russian Empire (today in Belarus), Kaplan attended a heder and high school in Łowicz. He joined the Socialist Zionist Party in 1905, and was one of the founders of the Youth of Zion – Renewal movement in 1908, later being elected secretary of its Minsk Region branch in 1912. He also helped found the Youth of Zion movement in Russia in 1912 and was a member of its central committee. In 1917 he graduated from a Moscow polytechnic as a building engineer.

In 1919 Kaplan was a member of the Ukrainian delegation to the Versailles Peace Conference. The following year he immigrated to Mandatory Palestine and was involved in merging Youth of Zion with Hapoel Hatzair to form Hitachdut. Following his participation in the Conference of the Zionist Federation in London, he was elected to the Zionist Executive Committee. Shortly afterwards he was sent to Berlin to run Hitachdut's world office.

Kaplan returned to Mandatory Palestine in 1923 and joined the Histadrut's Office of Public Works. A director of the technical department of the Tel Aviv municipality between 1923 and 1925, he was elected to Tel Aviv city council in 1925, remaining on the council until 1933. That year he joined the board of the Jewish Agency for Israel and served as its treasurer until 1948.

A member of the Assembly of Representatives, on 14 May 1948 Kaplan was one of the people to sign the Israeli declaration of independence, and was immediately appointed Minister of Finance in the provisional government. He was elected to the first Knesset as a member of Mapai, and retained the Finance Ministry post, also becoming Minister of Trade and Industry in Ben-Gurion's first government. In the second government the Trade and Industry portfolio was given to Yaakov Geri, but Kaplan remained Finance Minister.

He retained his seat and portfolio following the 1951 elections, and in June 1952 became the country's first Deputy Prime Minister. However, he died three weeks later.

== Commemoration ==
The Kaplan Medical Center in Rehovot built in 1953, the Kiryat Eliezer suburb of Netanya, the Eliezer neighbourhood of Kfar Saba, Kaplan Street in Tel Aviv, and Kaplan Street in Jerusalem's Kiryat HaMemshala (government complex) were all named in his honour.

The Kaplan Prize, awarded for the increase of productivity, is named after him.
