= Second government of Israel =

1950–51 government led by David Ben-Gurion

Second Ben-Gurion Cabinet
- 2nd Cabinet of Israel

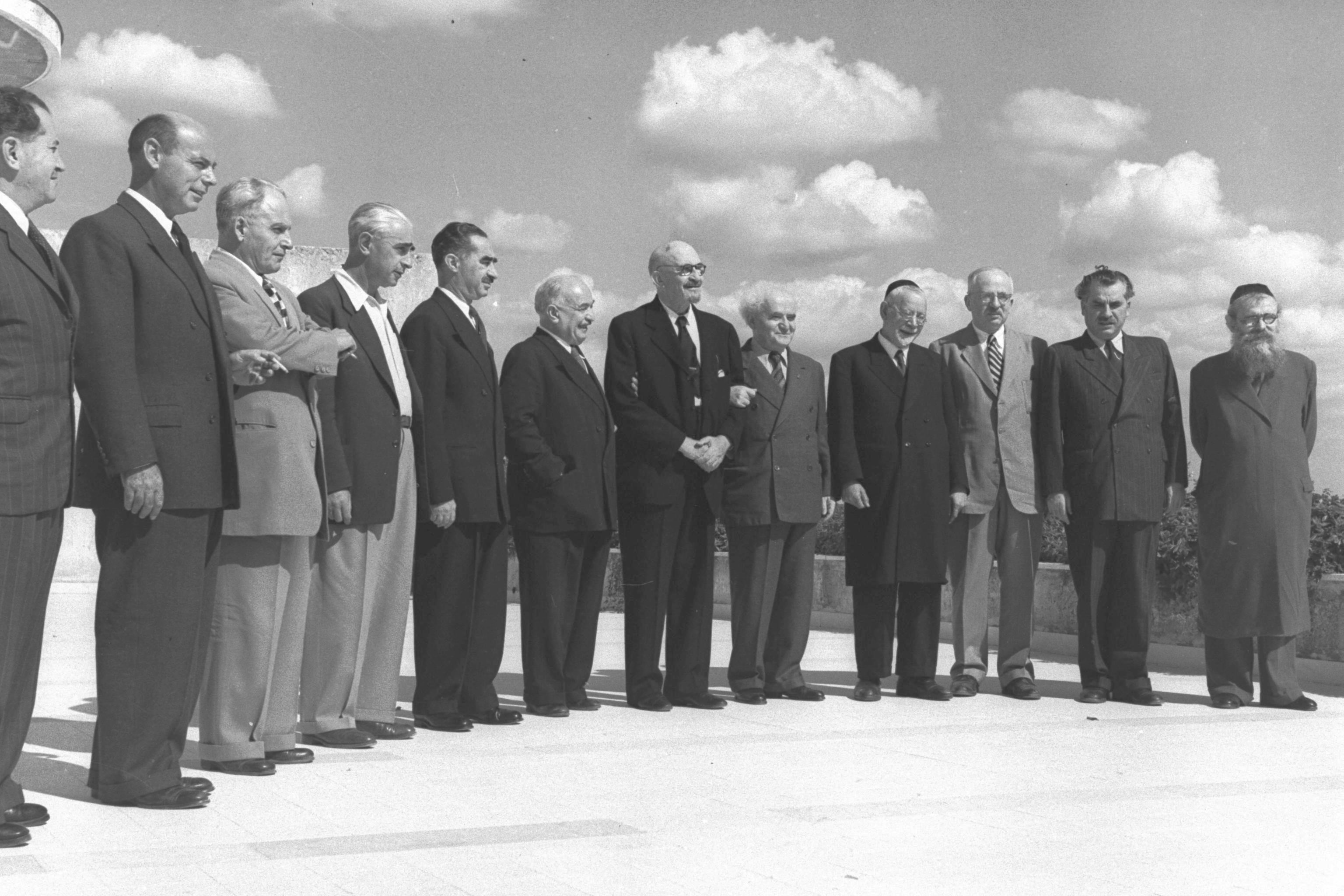
- The second Israeli government at the president's house in Rehovot. Left to Right: Zeev Sharef (cabinet secretary), Ya'akov Geri, Bechor-Shalom Sheetrit, Pinhas Lavon, Dov Yosef, David Remez, President Chaim Weizmann, Prime Minister David Ben-Gurion, Yehuda Leib Maimon, Pinchas Rosen, Haim-Moshe Shapira, Yitzhak-Meir Levin.
- Date formed: 1 November 1950
- Date dissolved: 8 October 1951

People and organisations
- Head of state: Chaim Weizmann
- Head of government: David Ben-Gurion
- Member parties: Mapai; United Religious Front; Progressive Party; Sephardim and Oriental Communities; Democratic List of Nazareth
- Status in legislature: Coalition
- Opposition leader: Meir Ya'ari

History
- Legislature term: 1st knesset
- Predecessor: 1st cabinet of Israel
- Successor: 3rd cabinet of Israel

The second government of Israel was formed during the first Knesset. Prime minister David Ben-Gurion made an attempt to form a minority government consisting of Mapai and Sephardim and Oriental Communities on 17 October, but it was not approved by the Knesset. Two days later, President Chaim Weizmann asked the Progressive Party leader Pinchas Rosen to form a government, but it was Ben-Gurion who finally managed to do so on 1 November 1950. The coalition partners were the same as in the first government: Mapai, the United Religious Front, the Progressive Party, the Sephardim and Oriental Communities and the Democratic List of Nazareth.

There was a slight reshuffle in the cabinet; David Remez moved from the Transportation ministry to Education, replacing Zalman Shazar (who was left out of the new cabinet), Dov Yosef replaced Remez as Minister of Transportation, whilst Pinhas Lavon replaced Yosef in as Minister of Agriculture. Ya'akov Geri was appointed Minister of Trade and Industry despite not being a Member of the Knesset. There was also a new Deputy Minister in the Transportation ministry.

Second government of Israel
Portfolio	Minister	Party
Prime Minister; Minister of Defense	David Ben-Gurion	Mapai
Minister of Agriculture	Pinhas Lavon	Mapai
Minister of Education and Culture	David Remez (1 November 1950 – 19 May 1951)	Mapai
Minister of Education and Culture	David Ben-Gurion (19 May – 8 October 1951)	Mapai
Minister of Foreign Affairs	Moshe Sharett	Mapai
Minister of Finance	Eliezer Kaplan	Mapai
Minister of Health; Minister of Immigration; Minister of Internal Affairs	Haim-Moshe Shapira	United Religious Front
Minister of Justice	Pinchas Rosen	Progressive Party
Minister of Labour and Social Security	Golda Meir	Mapai
Minister of Police	Bechor-Shalom Sheetrit	Sephardim and Oriental Communities
Minister of Religions and War Victims	Yehuda Leib Maimon	United Religious Front
Minister of Trade and Industry	Ya'akov Geri	Not an MK
Minister of Transportation	Dov Yosef	Mapai
Minister of Welfare	Yitzhak-Meir Levin	United Religious Front
Deputy Minister of Agriculture	Yosef Efrati	Mapai
Deputy Minister of Transportation	Reuven Shari	Mapai

The government resigned on 14 February 1951 after the Knesset had rejected David Remez's proposals on the registration of schoolchildren. Elections were held on 30 July 1951.
