= Menachem Cohen (politician) =

Israeli politician (1922–1975)

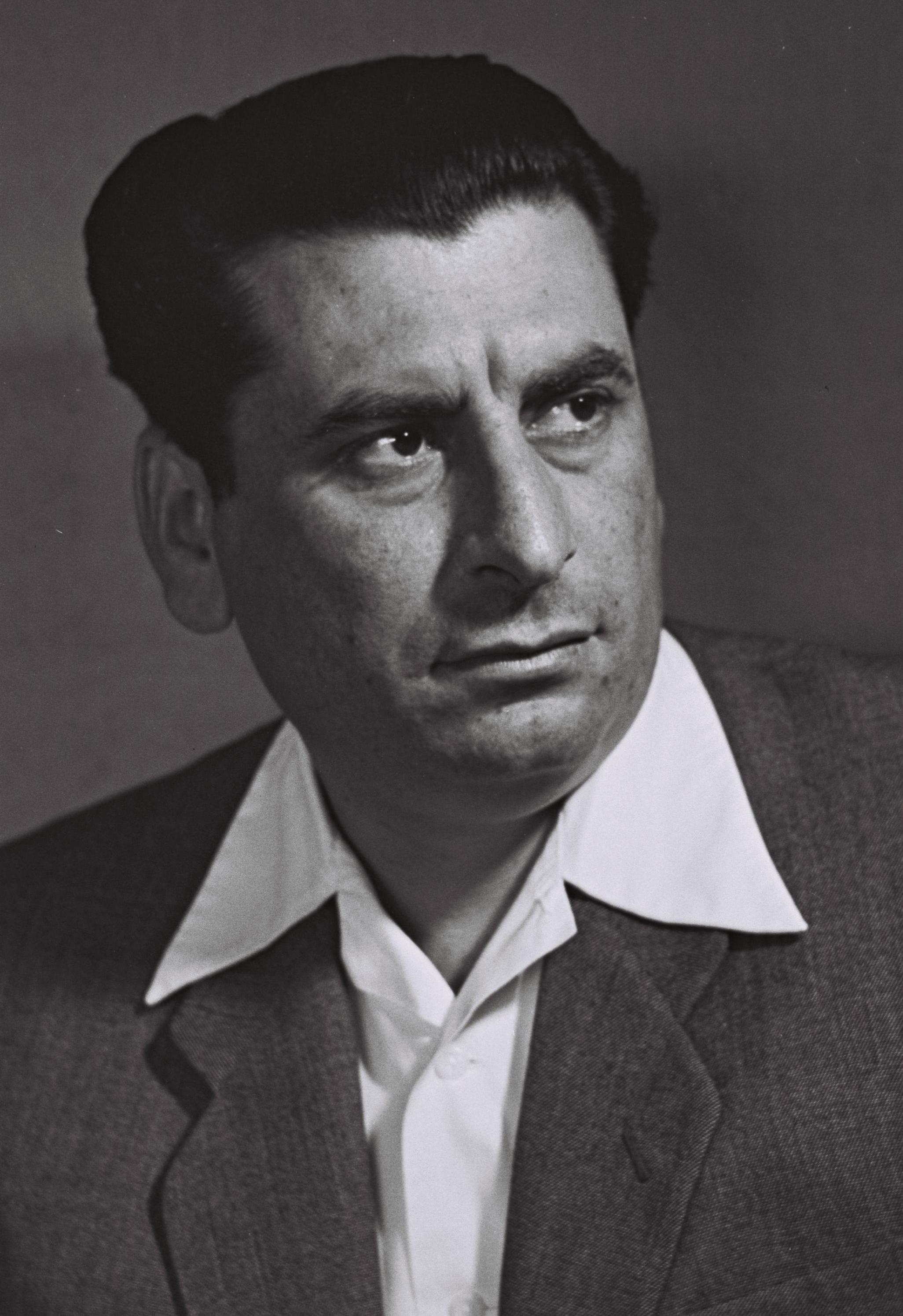

Faction represented in the Knesset
- 1951: Mapai
- 1959–1965: Mapai
- 1965–1968: Alignment
- 1968–1969: Labor Party
- 1969–1974: Alignment

Personal details
- Born: 5 July 1922; Jerusalem, Mandatory Palestine
- Died: 11 March 1975 (aged 52)

Menachem Cohen (Hebrew: מנחם כהן; 5 July 1922 – 11 March 1975) was an Israeli politician.

== Biography ==
Born in Jerusalem during the Mandate era, Cohen helped organise illegal Jewish immigration from Syria. He worked as a director of the Neighbourhoods Department on Tel Aviv Workers Council, and was a representative of the neighbourhoods (in particular, the Hatikva Quarter) on Tel Aviv City Council.

In the 1949 Knesset elections he was on the Mapai list, but failed to win a seat. Although he entered the Knesset on 19 May 1951 as a replacement for the deceased David Remez, he lost his seat in the July 1951 elections. He returned to the Knesset following the 1959 elections, and was re-elected in 1961. In 1965 and in 1969 elections, he was elected from the Alignment alliance list. He lost his seat in the 1973 elections, and died in 1975.
