= Goldreich =

Goldreich is an Ashkenazi-Jewish surname. Notable people with the surname include:

- Arthur Goldreich (1929–2011), South African activist
- Oded Goldreich, computer scientist
- Peter Goldreich, astrophysicist
- Tova Sanhadray Goldreich, Israeli politician
