= Jewish Communism =

Jewish Communism can refer to:

- Hebrew Communists, a short-lived political party in Mandate Palestine and Israel
- Jewish Bolshevism, a conspiracy theory that regards communism as a Jewish plot
- Jewish left, Jews with left-wing political views
- Żydokomuna, a Polish version of the Jewish Bolshevism conspiracy theory
