= Aharon Cohen =

Israeli politician

- אהרון כהן
- Born: 1910; Briceni, Bessarabia Governorate, Russian Empire
- Died: 1980 (aged 69–70); Israel
- Occupations: Politician, author
- Known for: Head of Mapam's Arab Department
- Political party: Mapam

Aharon Cohen (Hebrew: אהרון כהן; 1910–1980) was a senior member of Mapam, a pro-USSR Israeli political party which existed during the first two decades of statehood.

== Biography ==
Born in Briceni (formally, Britchany), Bessarabia Governorate, Russian Empire (later Romania, nowaydays Moldova). He came to Palestine in 1929 where he joined kibbutz Sha'ar Ha'amakin, near Haifa. Four years later he was sent back to Romania as a Zionist youth movement organiser. He returned to Palestine in 1936 where a year later he was elected to the executive committee of Ha-kibbutz Ha'artzi and was involved in organizing political work in Haifa and illegal Jewish immigration. A talented and efficient organizer he was given the task of setting up Hakibbutz Ha'artzi's Arab Department. Party policy advocated an undivided and Socialist Palestine and to this objective he gave lectures and issued bulletins to party members advocating good relations with Arabs. In 1942 he pressed his party into joining the League for Jewish Arab Rapprochement and Cooperation. That year he joined the Histadrut's Arab Department which had a budget of £P 1,800. He had been, and remained, sceptical of Histadrut policy of creating its own Arab trade unions rather than working with existing organizations.

In 1948, he became head of Mapam's "Arab Department". He was the author of "Our policy towards Arabs during the War" a Mapam policy statement endorsed by their Political Committee and distributed to all party workers on 15 June 1948. It opposed the expulsion of civilians and advocated a return of refugees after the war. In the 1949 elections he supervised the Popular Arab Bloc, Mapam's party for Arabs, which failed to gain any support.

In 1964 he published "Israel and the Arab World". An English translation was published in 1970. He argues that during the 1920s and early 1930s the British administration encouraged local resistance to Zionist activities. He gives accounts of negotiations, some of which he was active in, with senior Arab figures from the second half of the 1930s up to 1945. He claims that these initiatives failed to make progress due to the refusal of the Jewish Agency to commit to any definite proposals. Referring to contacts made in 1943 he writes: "Advocacy of negotiations was ridiculed, even vilified. The Arab negotiators could not fail to note the indifference and even hostility with which the attempt had been received by official Jewish leaders and by the Jewish community."

Notes made by Cohen at meetings of the Mapam Political Committee were used by historian Benny Morris as a primary source for accounts of atrocities committed by the IDF in the autumn of 1948.
