= Rationing and Supply Minister of Israel =

Ministry of Rationing and Supply
- משרד האספקה והקיצוב
- Emblem of Israel

Agency overview
- Formed: 1949
- Dissolved: 1950
- Jurisdiction: Government of Israel

The Minister of Rationing and Supply (Hebrew: שר הקיצוב והאספקה, Sar HaKitzuv VeHaAspaka) was a short-lived portfolio in the Israeli cabinet. It was created on 26 April 1949 following a speech by Prime Minister David Ben-Gurion introducing the country's austerity programme, and was held by Dov Yosef. However, Ben-Gurion soon wanted the ministry closed down, and achieved his goal when forming the second government in October/November 1950 (the first government's collapse had been partially due to an internal crisis in the Mapai over the ministry's liquidation).

== List of ministers ==
#	Name	Party	Government	Term start	Term end
1	Dov Yosef	Mapai	1	26 April 1949	1 November 1950
