= Rachel Cohen-Kagan =

Israeli politician (1888–1982)

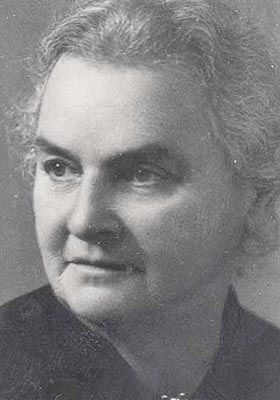

Faction represented in the Knesset
- 1949–1951: WIZO
- 1961–1965: Liberal Party
- 1965: Independent Liberals

Personal details
- Born: 19 February 1888 Odessa, Russian Empire
- Died: 15 October 1982 (aged 94)

Rachel Cohen-Kagan (Hebrew: רחל כהן-כגן; 19 February 1888 – 15 October 1982) was a Zionist activist and Israeli politician, and one of only two women to sign the Israeli Declaration of Independence, alongside Golda Meir.

== Biography ==
Rachel Lubarsky (later Cohen-Kagan) was born in the city of Odessa in the Russian Empire (today in Ukraine), her father was one of the founders of the Lovers of Zion movement. Her father's occupation exposed her at an early age to the great Zionists and Jews of Odessa like Ahad Ha'am and Hayim Nahman Bialik. Cohen-Kagan attended university in her home city, and was also granted an honorary degree from the Hebrew University of Jerusalem. She immigrated to Mandatory Palestine in 1919 on board the ship Ruslan, along with the historian Joseph Klausner, the painter Yitzhak Frenkel and the architect Zeev Rechter. and became involved in the Women's International Zionist Organization (WIZO).

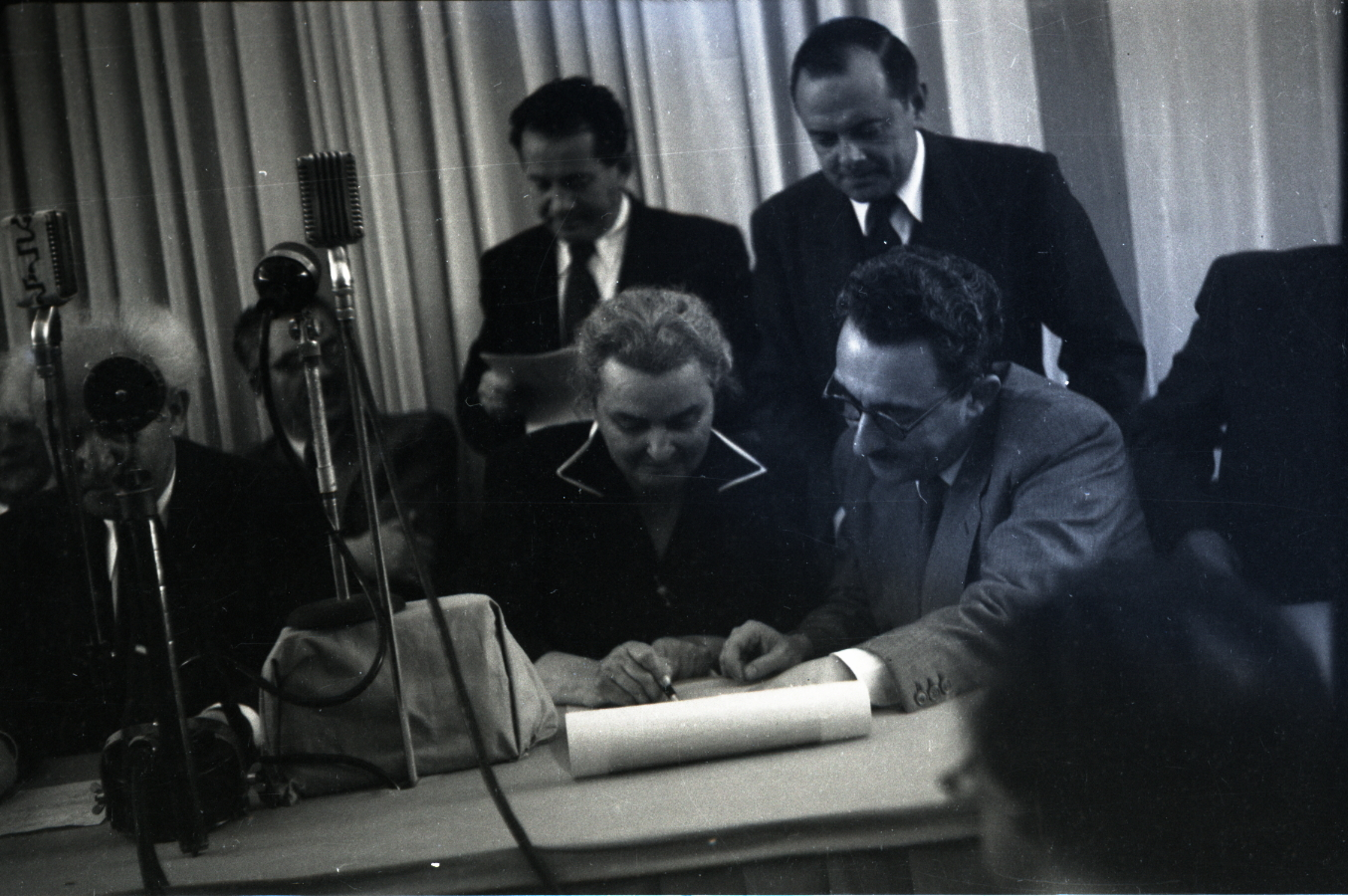
Cohen-Kagan signs Israeli declaration of independence

In 1932 she was appointed chairwoman of the Committee for Social Aid in the Community Committee of Haifa, a role she held until 1946. In 1938, she was elected chairwoman of WIZO, and became more involved in politics. In 1946 she was appointed director of the Social Department of the Jewish National Council. A member of Moetzet HaAm, in 1948 Cohen-Kagan was one of only two women (the other was Golda Meir) to sign the Israeli declaration of independence.

In the first Knesset elections in 1949, WIZO won a single seat, which was taken by Cohen-Kagan. During her first term in the Knesset, she was the sponsor of the first legislation promoting equal rights for women. However, she lost her seat in the 1951 elections.

After later joining the Liberal Party, she returned to the Knesset on its list following the 1961 elections. However, Cohen-Kagan was one of the seven MKs who broke away from the party to found the Independent Liberals in opposition to the impending merger with Herut. She lost her seat in the 1965 elections.

Cohen-Kagan had two children. She died on 15 October 1982 at the age of 94.

Streets in Ra'anana, Rishon Lezion and Haifa are named after her.
