= Zecharia Glosca =

Israeli politician

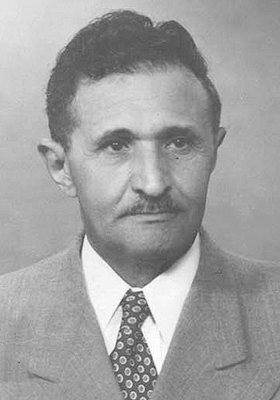

Faction represented in the Knesset
- 1949–1951: Yemenite Association

Personal details
- Born: 1894 Yemen, Ottoman Empire
- Died: 19 September 1960 (aged 65–66) Montreal, Canada

Zecharia Glosca (Hebrew: זכריה גלוסקא; 1894 – 19 September 1960) was a Yemenite Jew and Israeli politician who served as a member of the Knesset for the Yemenite Association between 1949 and 1951.

== Biography ==
Born in Yemen Vilayet in the Ottoman Empire, Glosca moved to Ottoman-controlled Palestine in 1909. His family settled in the Tel Aviv neighbourhood of Neve Tzedek, and he studied in a heder. Afterwards, he worked as a factory labourer and an agricultural labourer in orchards around Petah Tikva.

He joined Hapoel Hatzair in 1911, and was also one of the first members of the Histadrut union. In 1921 he was amongst the founders of the Young Mizrahi Federation, becoming its chairman in 1925.

In 1922 he was elected to the Assembly of Representatives, where he served until 1928. He worked as an emissary for the Yemenite Association in Egypt and the United States. He returned in 1949 and headed the Association's list in the first elections that year. The party won a single seat, taken by Glosca.

In the 1951 elections Shimon Garidi took over as head of the list, and Glosca lost his seat.

He died in Montreal on 19 September 1960 while visiting Canada to raise money for the absorption of Yemenite immigrants.
