= Popular Arab Bloc =

Popular Arab Bloc הגוש העממי הערבי
- Leader: George Netzer
- Founded: 1949
- Dissolved: 1949
- National affiliation: Mapam

Election symbol
- ת

The Popular Arab Bloc (Hebrew: הגוש העממי הערבי, HaGush Ha'Amami HaAravi) was an Arab satellite list that contested the 1949 Israeli Constituent Assembly election. The list was launched by Mapam, just three weeks before the election, in order to mobilize Israeli Arab votes. As Mapam did not allow Arabs to be members of the party, it preferred to set up a separate list for Arabs. The election campaigning was done under the supervision of the Mapam Arab Affairs Department, led by Aharon Cohen. The list obtained 2,812 votes, failing to cross the 1% electoral threshold (4,347 votes) required to win a seat.

By the time of the next elections in 1951, Mapam had allowed Arabs to gain membership, with Rostam Bastuni being elected on the party's list.
