= Betty Halff-Epstein =

Swiss entrepreneur

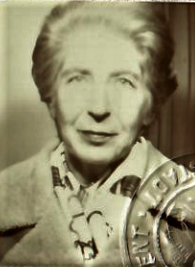
Betty Halff-Epstein

Betty Halff-Epstein, née Epstein (January 3rd, 1905 – May 31, 1991) was a Swiss entrepreneur and pioneer of the second wave of the women's movement. During the Second World War, she and her brother Max Epstein helped persecuted Jews to emigrate to the USA. From Basel, she also provided interned prisoners in the Camp de Gurs (F) with food and utensils. After the war she became involved with WIZO.

== Life ==
Betty Epstein grew up in a middle-class household in Zurich with her 14-month older brother Max and her nine-year younger sister Ruth. The family was Jewish Orthodox.

After completing compulsory school in 1920, Epstein began an education at the commercial school in Zurich. In 1923 she spent a year in Versailles to learn French and how to run a household as part of her training to become a grande dame. During this time, she was actively involved in French art, music, theatre and literature. She was not allowed to study and had to bow to her parents' wishes to be able to run a large household and to move in style on the social stage.

In 1926, the 21-year-old Epstein married Gérard Halff (1889–1939), fifteen years her senior, a businessman and owner of the chemical raw materials company Gerhard Halff AG. The marriage was arranged by a matchmaker. With the marriage came the move to Basel, where they lived for the rest of their lives.

In 1927 their first daughter Marlise was born (later Marlise Staehelin). Three years later, in 1930, their second daughter Lily-Anne followed. At this time, the Halff-Epstein couple also commissioned various architects to build a new house for the family, including the well-known Swiss architect Otto Rudolf Salvisberg.

== Second World War ==
At the beginning of the Second World War, Gérard Halff died at the age of 50. While he was in hospital, he instructed his wife in all aspects of running the business. Halff-Epstein took over the management from her late husband against the will of her in-laws and prevailed against her husband's former business partner who wanted to hand over the clientele to his recently founded company. The takeover of the company took place under difficult conditions: During the post-war period, Halff-Epstein had to convince business partners of her abilities as a managing director on numerous business trips to France, Belgium and England. Through this fundamental work, Halff-Epstein helped the company to boom in the 1950s and 1960s.

Due to the tense political situation in Europe, Halff-Epstein wanted to emigrate to the United States, where she had relatives, after the death of her husband. With the help of a lively correspondence between the American embassy in Germany and the American consulate in Zurich, as well as affidavits from her circle of friends and family in the US, she obtained a visa. However, her daughters, especially the elder Marlise, successfully resisted emigration. Halff-Epstein spent most of the war period in Basel. Her daughters stayed in Geneva with Betty's sister Ruth during the war.

Throughout the Nazi era, Betty Halff-Epstein and her brother Max Epstein helped Jewish friends and relatives abroad. Before the war began, the help focused on their uncle and cousin in Freiburg im Breisgau (DE). Max Epstein in particular tried to make it possible for his cousin and his family to emigrate to the US. The uncle was deported to the Camp de Gurs (FR), which he survived. For many friends and acquaintances, Halff-Epstein wrote to her contacts in the US to procure affidavits, but not always successfully.

Throughout the war, Halff-Epstein worried about her friends and relatives abroad who did not seek safety - often with fatal results. For example, one of her cousins, who had spent part of the war in Basel, travelled back to Belgium to be with her daughter. Her cousin Richard Guggenheim, who was in a preparatory camp for emigration to Palestine, was also a victim of Nazi atrocities. Other relatives exposed themselves strongly through public anti-fascist statements and thus exposed themselves to great danger. The flat in Basel was always open during this time for needy people and relatives who needed shelter. In 1943 Halff-Epstein took responsibility for her cousin Hans Guggenheim, who was sent to a Swiss labour camp in the same year. In June 1946, she finally took over guardianship of Hans Guggenheim.

In 1944, her brother Max Epstein died. His death was a great shock to the Halff-Epstein family. Max Epstein had been a great support to his sister Betty after the death of Gérard Halff and a kind of a foster father to his two nieces Marlise and Lily-Anne. Max Epstein's role was taken over after the war by her cousin Manfred Guggenheim, who lived in Berlin before the war. He managed to emigrate to the USA via Cuba and came back to Europe with the allied invasion.

The war robbed Halff-Epstein of her faith in God and she felt less committed to religious traditions. After the war ended, she toyed with the idea of emigrating to Palestine or marrying a Christian man so that her daughters would never meet the same fate as the victims of the Shoah.

== Activities with WIZO ==
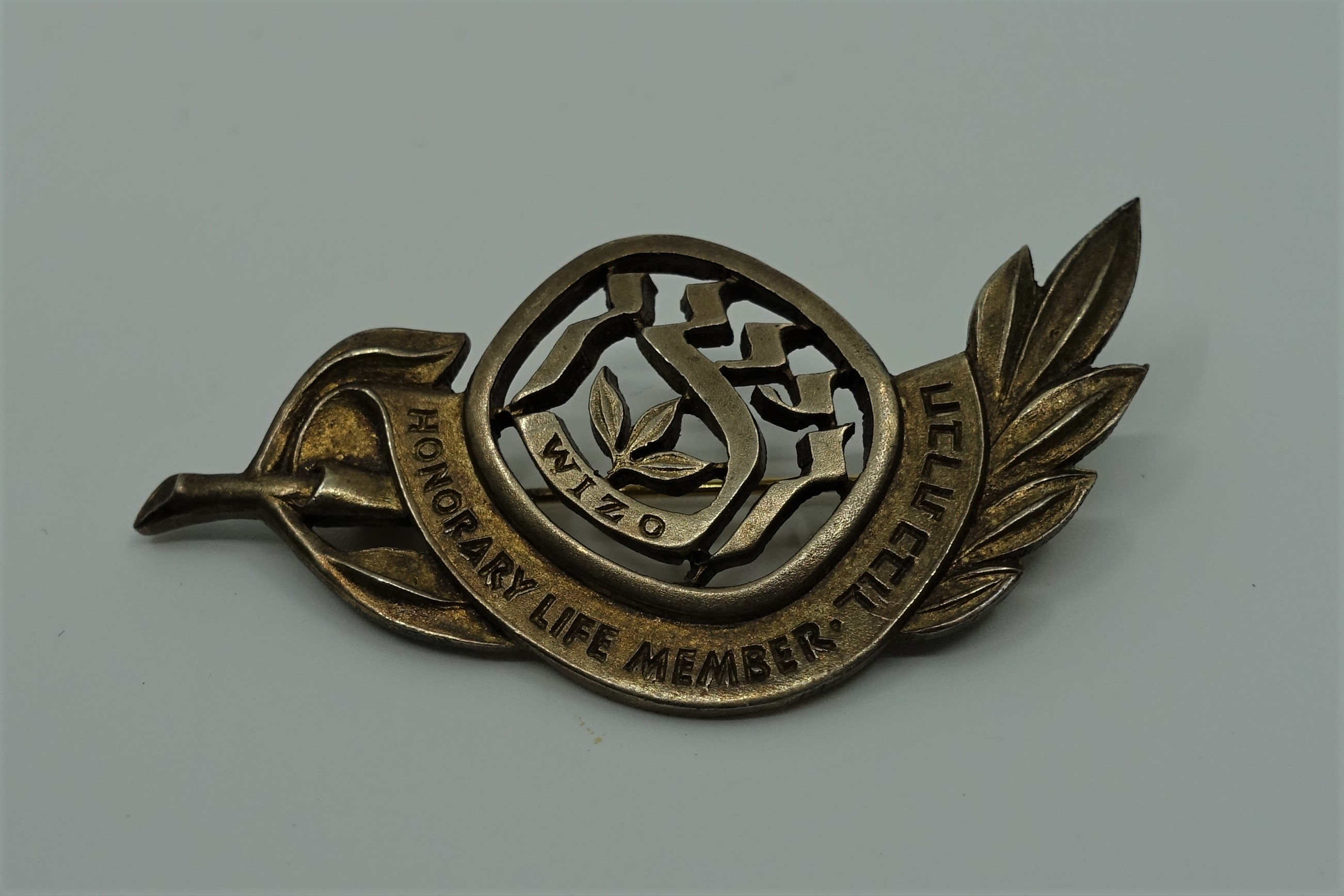
WIZO badge of honour belonging to Betty Halff-Epstein, in the Jewish Museum of Switzerland’s collection.

During the war, Halff-Epstein became involved with WIZO (Women's International Zionist Organisation). The difficult war years and her humanitarian commitment at that time awakened in her the desire to work for the Jewish cause. She herself put it this way in her farewell speech on the occasion of her resignation from office:

"When we witnessed the unimaginable inferno in the last world war, even in our Switzerland, which was spared of the fate of the neighbouring countries, and my house was often a reception camp and letterbox for strangers, I made a promise to myself: To do everything in my modest power so that the Jewish people will never again be so helplessly at the mercy of their destroyers."

Between 1944 and 1962, Halff-Epstein was the President of the Swiss WIZO Federation and later became its Honorary President. After her time as president, she became an Honorary Member of the Executive of World WIZO and a member of the Finance Committee.

Under Halff-Epstein's leadership, the Swiss WIZO Federation took over the agricultural secondary school in Nachalat Yehuda, a WIZO youth village. She also initiated an orange campaign for Nachalat Yehuda and founded a patronage committee for it. It is also thanks to her that the National Association of Swiss Women for Palestine Work became the Swiss WIZO Federation.

During a trip of the delegation of all WIZO presidents to Israel, she met Golda Meir.

== Life after the war and alongside WIZO ==
Parallel to her involvement with WIZO, Halff-Epstein continued her education from 1960 onwards, taking courses at the University of Basel in art history, philosophy, history and German studies. At the same time, she sold the company she had inherited from her husband.

In the 1960s, Halff-Epstein suffered another stroke of fate. Her youngest daughter Lily-Anne suffered a serious car accident that also damaged her brain. From then on, Halff-Epstein took intensive care of her daughter and her young family.

Halff-Epstein often travelled to the US and Israel, even shortly after the Six-Day War. She was often accompanied on her trips by friends, grandchildren or other family members.

At the beginning of 1991, her eldest daughter Marlise died of cancer. The death of her daughter was unbearable for Halff-Epstein and she died soon afterwards, on 31 May 1991. The estate was donated to the Jewish Museum of Switzerland.

Her greatest merits include her great success as a business manager at a time when this role was not socially recognised for women, as well as her humanitarian commitment - whether in helping and rescuing Jews during the Second World War or in the context of her WIZO activities.
