= Eliezer Preminger =

Israeli politician

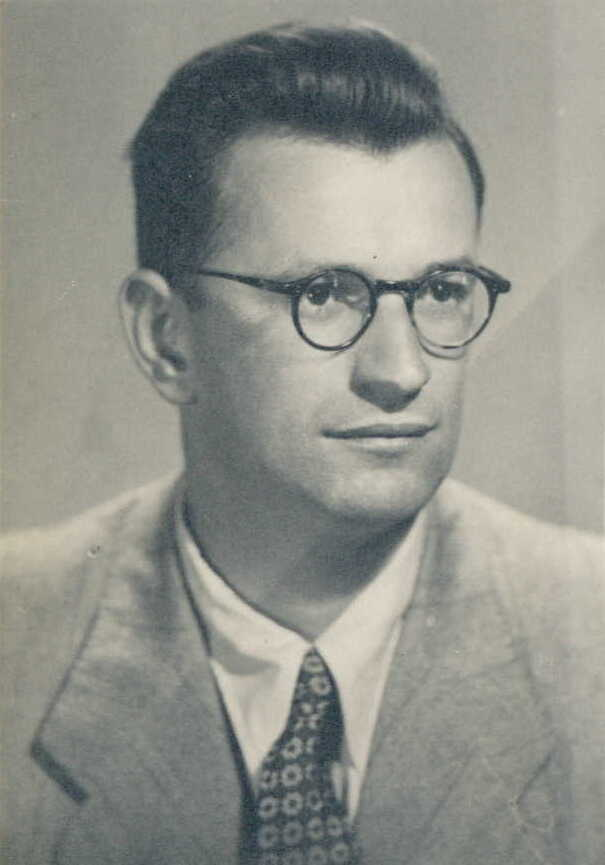
- Preminger during his time in the Knesset

Faction represented in the Knesset
- 1949: Maki
- 1949: Hebrew Communists
- 1949–1951: Mapam

Personal details
- Born: 13 April 1920 Vienna, Austria
- Died: 15 September 2001 (aged 81)

Eliezer Preminger (Hebrew: אליעזר פרמינגר; 13 April 1920 – 15 September 2001) was an Israeli politician who served as a member of the Knesset for Maki, the Hebrew Communists and Mapam between 1949 and 1951.

== Biography ==
Preminger was born in Vienna in 1920 to liberal traditional parents, Hillel (Heinrich) and Amalia (Malka) Preminger. His parents were Galician Jews who had moved to the Austro-Hungarian capital to seek their fortune. As the fascist movement gained a foothold in Austria, the teenage Preminger became an active member of the underground Communist youth movement. During Kristallnacht, Preminger's mother hid him in a closet when Sturmabteilung stormtroopers raided their home in search of Jewish males. The following day, Preminger asked the head of his underground Communist cell for help, who could only suggest to him that he leave for Palestine. His family searched in vain for relatives in other countries that they could potentially join. As a student, Preminger excelled in his studies, and had hoped to study classical languages, but upon receiving an entry visa to Palestine by way of a scholarship to study at the Technion, he was obliged to change directions and study engineering.

Preminger emigrated to Mandatory Palestine in 1939. He joined the Palestine Communist Party, but in 1945 was one of the leaders of a group that left in order to form the Communist League. In July 1947, he represented the Communist League before UNSCOP. Later that year, in October, the party would become known as the Hebrew Communists.

In 1948 he joined Maki, and was elected to the first Knesset in 1949 on the party's list. During his period in the Knesset, Preminger held the following functions: Chair, Subcommittee on Distribution of Raw Materials, Observer, Constitution, Law and Justice Committee, Member of Economic Affairs Committee, Constitution, Law and Justice Committee, Committee for Public Services. Following a purge of Maki's leadership, Preminger left the party and resurrected the Hebrew Communists party on 8 June 1949. On 15 August 1949 he joined Mapam. He lost his seat in the 1951 elections, and later worked as Deputy Director General of the Ministry of Development, as well as serving on the board of directors of Israel Quarries and the Phosphates Company.

He died in 2001 and was buried at Kiryat Shaul Cemetery.
