= Shimon Garidi =

Israeli politician (1912–2003)

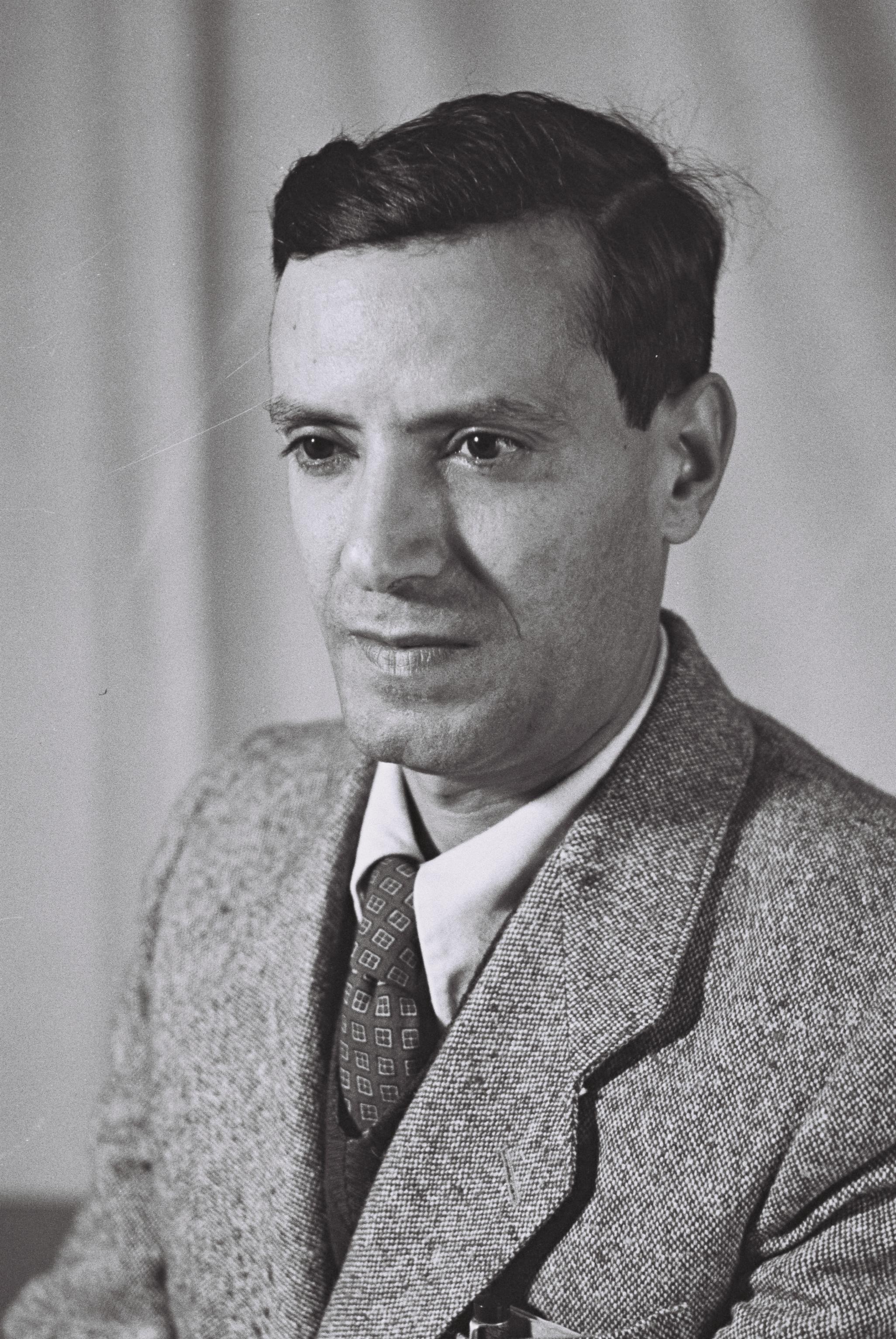
- Garidi in 1951

Faction represented in the Knesset
- 1951: Yemenite Association
- 1951–1955: General Zionists
- 1955: Yemenite Association

Personal details
- Born: 1 December 1912 Dhamar, Ottoman Empire
- Died: 15 January 2003 (aged 90)

Shimon Garidi (Hebrew: שמעון גרידי; 1 December 1912 – 15 January 2003) was an Israeli politician who served as a member of the Knesset between 1951 and 1955.

== Biography ==
Born in Dhamar in the Ottoman Empire (today in Yemen), Garidi emigrated to Palestine in 1920. He studied at high school in Tel Aviv, and later gained an MA in Middle Eastern and Jewish Studies at the Hebrew University of Jerusalem. Between 1932 and 1944 he worked as a Hebrew teacher. He was also a member of the Yemenite youth movement Bnei Shalom in Jerusalem. In 1940, he became secretary of the central committee of the Yemenite Association, serving until 1944.

In 1951 he became head of the Association's list for the elections that year, and was elected to the Knesset as the party won a single seat. Less than a month after being elected the Yemenite Association merged into the General Zionists. However, on 29 June 1955 he broke away from the party to reform the Yemenite Association as an independent faction, a move that was not approved by the House committee. In the July 1955 elections the party received only 0.3% of the vote, below the 1% electoral threshold, and Garidi lost his seat.

He published several books; From Yemen to Zion with Yisrael Yeshayahu in 1938, HaTag: Pentateuch according to Yemenite Jewish tradition in 1940 and Jewish Archives in Yemen in 1948. He also edited the Book of Yemenite Jewry, which was written in memory of fellow Yemenite Association MK Zecharia Glosca in 1974. He died in 2003 at the age of 90.

== Bibliography ==
- From the Customs of Yemenite Jewry (in Hebrew)
