= David Remez =

Israeli politician (1886–1951)

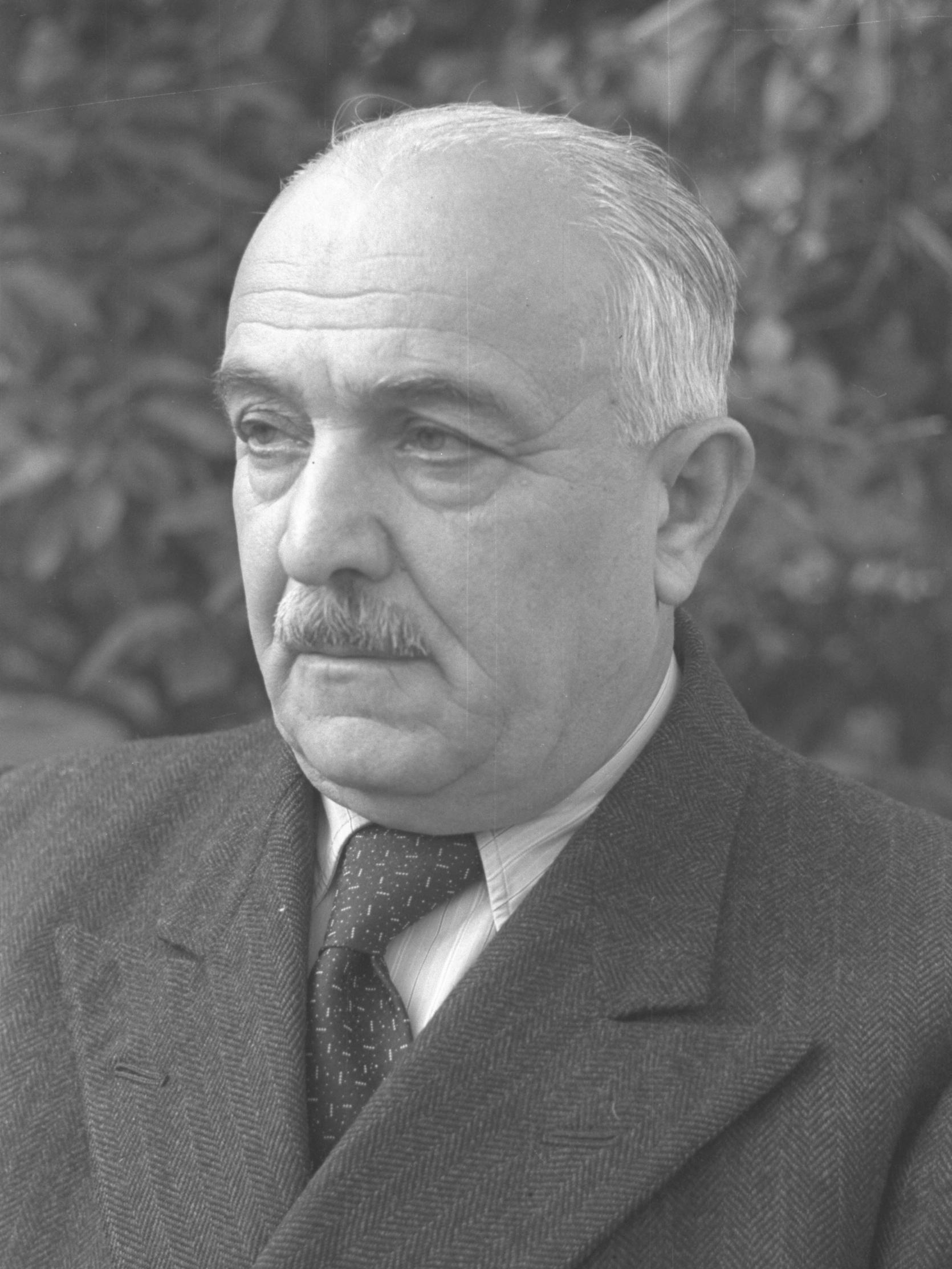
- Remez in 1948

Ministerial roles
- 1948–1950: Minister of Transportation
- 1950–1951: Minister of Education

Faction represented in the Knesset
- 1949–1951: Mapai

Personal details
- Born: 23 May 1886 Kopys, Russian Empire
- Died: 19 May 1951 (aged 64) Jerusalem, Israel

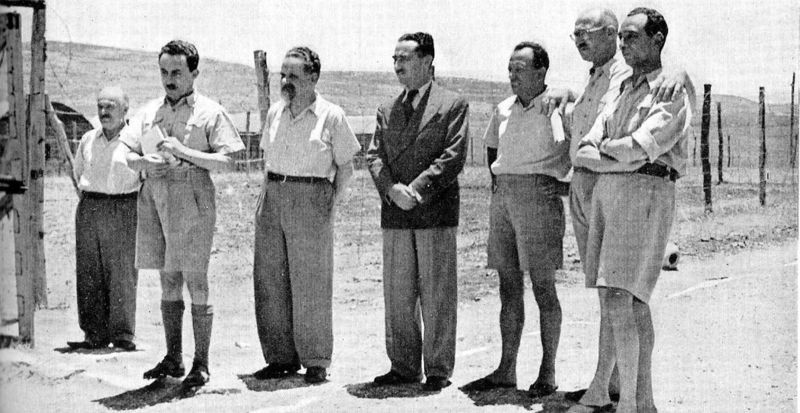
Zionist leaders, arrested in Operation Agatha, in detention in Latrun (l-r): David Remez, Moshe Sharett, Yitzhak Gruenbaum, Dov Yosef, Mr. Shenkarsky, David Hacohen and Mr. Halperin (1946)

David Remez (Hebrew: דוד רמז; 23 May 1886 – 19 May 1951) was an Israeli politician, the country's first Minister of Transportation, and a signatory of the Israeli declaration of independence.

== Biography ==
Remez was born David Drabkin in the village of Kopys in the Mogilev Governorate of the Russian Empire (now in Belarus) in 1886. After attending high school he studied law in Turkey before starting work as a teacher. He moved to Ottoman Palestine in 1913, and worked as an agricultural laborer in Ben Shemen, Be'er Tuvia, Karkur and Zikhron Ya'akov.

He became involved in politics and trade unionism soon after the Mandate era began, serving as Director of the Public Works Office of the Histadrut and Solel Boneh from 1921 to 1929 as well as on Tel Aviv's city council from 1921 to 1925, and was a founding member of David Ben-Gurion's Mapai party. He became Secretary of the Histadrut in 1930, a position he retained until 1946, and also chaired the Jewish National Council from 1944 to 1949.

As part of Operation Agatha by the British government of Mandatory Palestine, Remez was one of 2,700 Jews arrested and imprisoned. Remez was interned in Latrun, together with other high-ranking officials.

Having signed Israel's declaration of independence, Remez was appointed Minister of Transportation in David Ben-Gurion's provisional government on 14 May 1948, a position he retained after the formation of the first government following the first Knesset elections in 1949. When the first government collapsed in November 1950, Remez became Education Minister taking over from Zalman Shazar. Remez, along with the Knesset's speaker commissioned Ecole de Paris painter, Yitzhak Frenkel to paint a 50-square-metre (540 sq ft) painting of the first Knesset and dignitaries. Following Remez's death the painting was decommissioned by his successor.

He died in office in May 1951, the first Israeli minister to do so. His Knesset seat was taken by Menachem Cohen.

After his death several places in Israel were named after him, among them the Haifa neighborhood Ramot Remez and Remez Square in Jerusalem. His son, Aharon Remez was the second commander of the Israeli Air Force.
