= Women's International Zionist Organization =

Volunteer organization in Israel

- ויצו
- Formation: London, 7 June 1920; 106 years ago
- Founder: Vera Weizmann; Rebecca Sieff; Edit Edgar
- Type: INGO
- President: Anat Vidor
- Website: wizo.org

The Women's International Zionist Organization (WIZO; Hebrew: ויצו, romanized: Vitzo) is a volunteer organization dedicated to social welfare in all sectors of Israeli society, the advancement of the status of women, and Jewish education in Israel and the diaspora.

== History ==
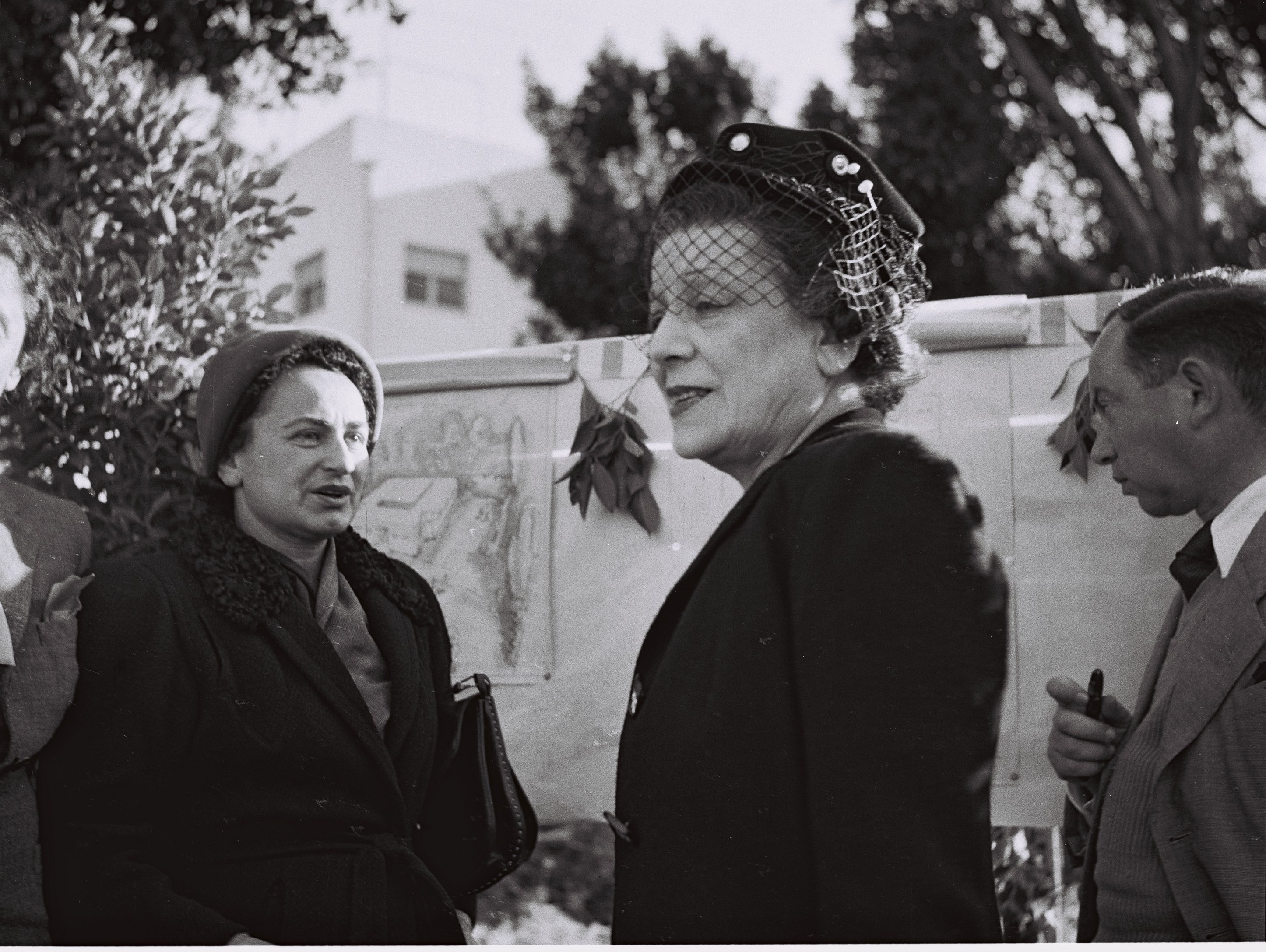
Vera Weizman visiting a WIZO nursery in Rehovot in 1946

WIZO was founded in England on 7 July 1920 by Rebecca Sieff, Vera Weizmann (wife of Israel's first president, Chaim Weizmann), Edith Eder, Romana Goodman, and Henrietta Irwell to provide community services for the residents of Mandatory Palestine. Among WIZO's early social welfare projects in Mandatory Palestine were the establishment of Tipat Halav well-baby clinics and clothing distribution centers, many of which are still in operation today. WIZO opened the country's first day care center in Tel Aviv in 1927.

WIZO branches opened across Europe, such as that run by Julia Batino in Macedonia, but many were closed down in the wake of Nazi occupation and the Holocaust. Branches in Latin America continued to operate during the war.

In 1949, after the establishment of the State of Israel, WIZO moved its headquarters to Israel and Sieff became president of the world WIZO organization. After Sieff died in 1966, she was replaced by Rosa Ginossar, who had been acting President since 1963. Other past presidents include Raya Jaglom and Michal Har'el, former Miss Israel and wife of Israeli politician Yitzhak Moda'i.

Presidents Evelyn Sommer (WIZO) and Ilana Ben Ami (WIZO Israel) tried to negotiate with Mexican president Luis Echeverría in 1975 to dissuade him from condemning Zionism as racism during the World Conference on Women in Mexico. Despite Echeverría's promises, the United Nations General Assembly, after the impulse of Arab countries and the support of the Non-Aligned Movement countries and the Soviet bloc, adopted Resolution 3379 against Zionism. Almost 20 years passed before the UN Resolution 46/86 revoked the 1975 determination.

In 2008, WIZO, together with two other women's organizations, received the Israel Prize for its lifetime achievements and special contribution to society and the State of Israel.

== Political activity in Israel ==
WIZO and the Women's Association for Rights ויצו והתאחדות נשים לשיווי זכויות
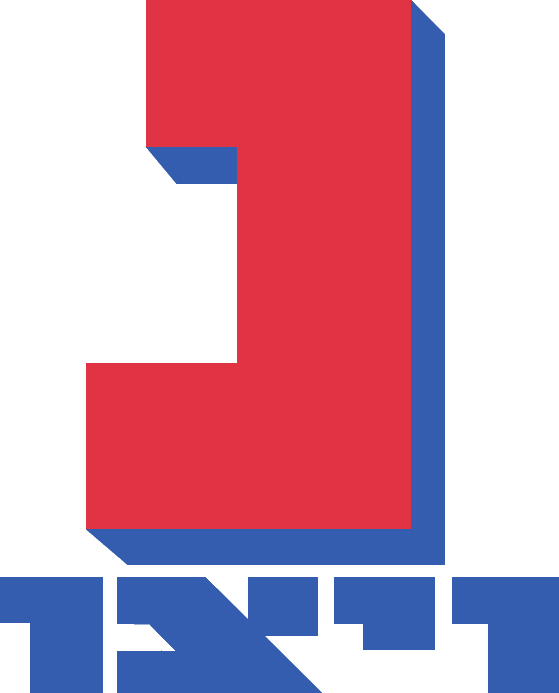
- Leader: Rachel Cohen-Kagan
- Founded: 1949
- Dissolved: 1951
- Ideology: Social Welfare; Zionism; Women's rights
- Most MKs: 1 (1949–1951)
- Fewest MKs: 1 (1949–1951)

Election symbol
- נ

WIZO formed a party and ran for Knesset in Israel's first elections in 1949, receiving 1.2% of the vote. It won one seat and was represented by Rachel Cohen-Kagan, chairwoman of WIZO at the time. Cohen-Kagan later ran in elections for the fifth Knesset as a member of the Liberal Party (though she was a member of the group that broke away to form the Independent Liberals).

== Today ==
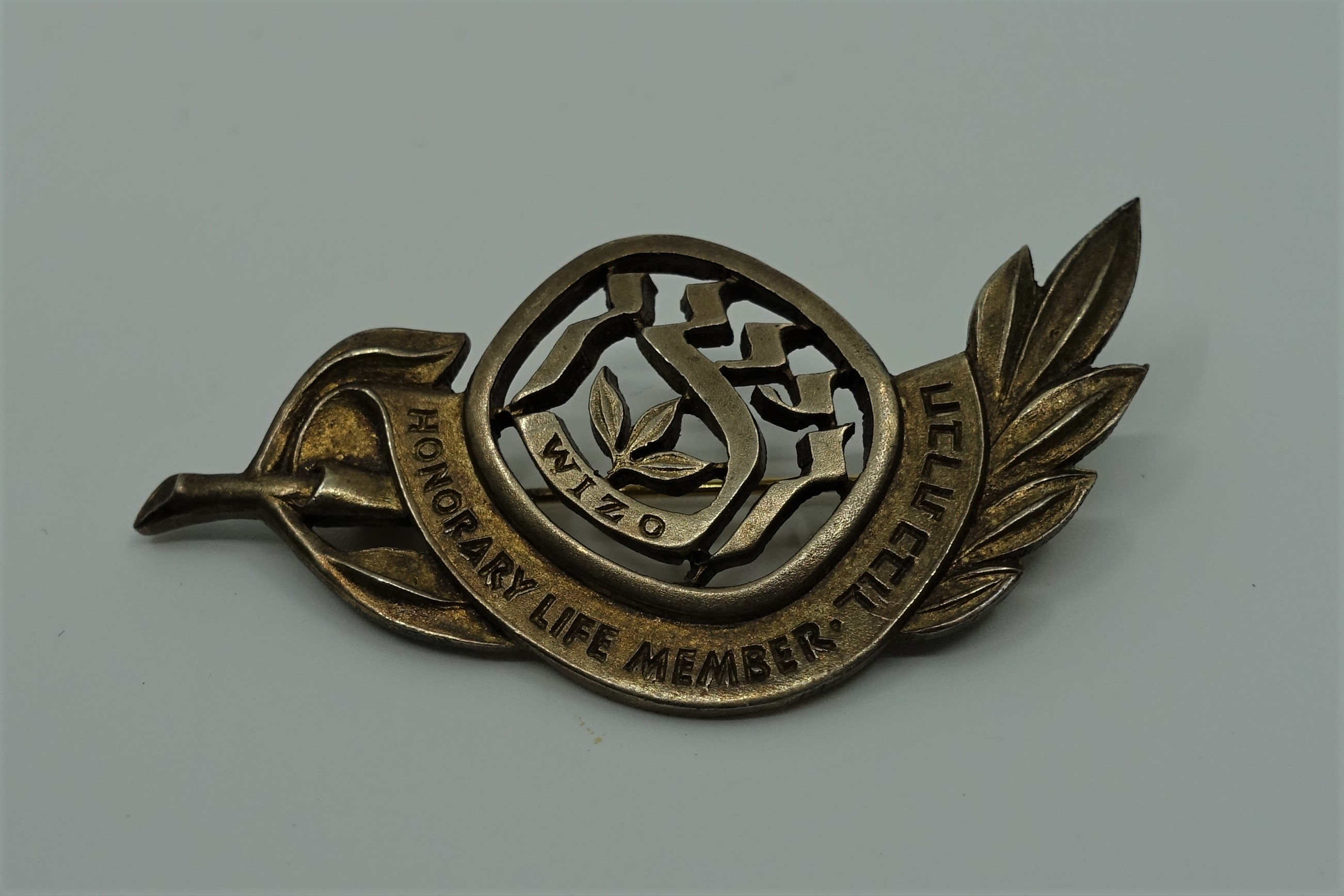
WIZO badge of honour belonging to Betty Halff-Epstein, in the Jewish Museum of Switzerland’s collection

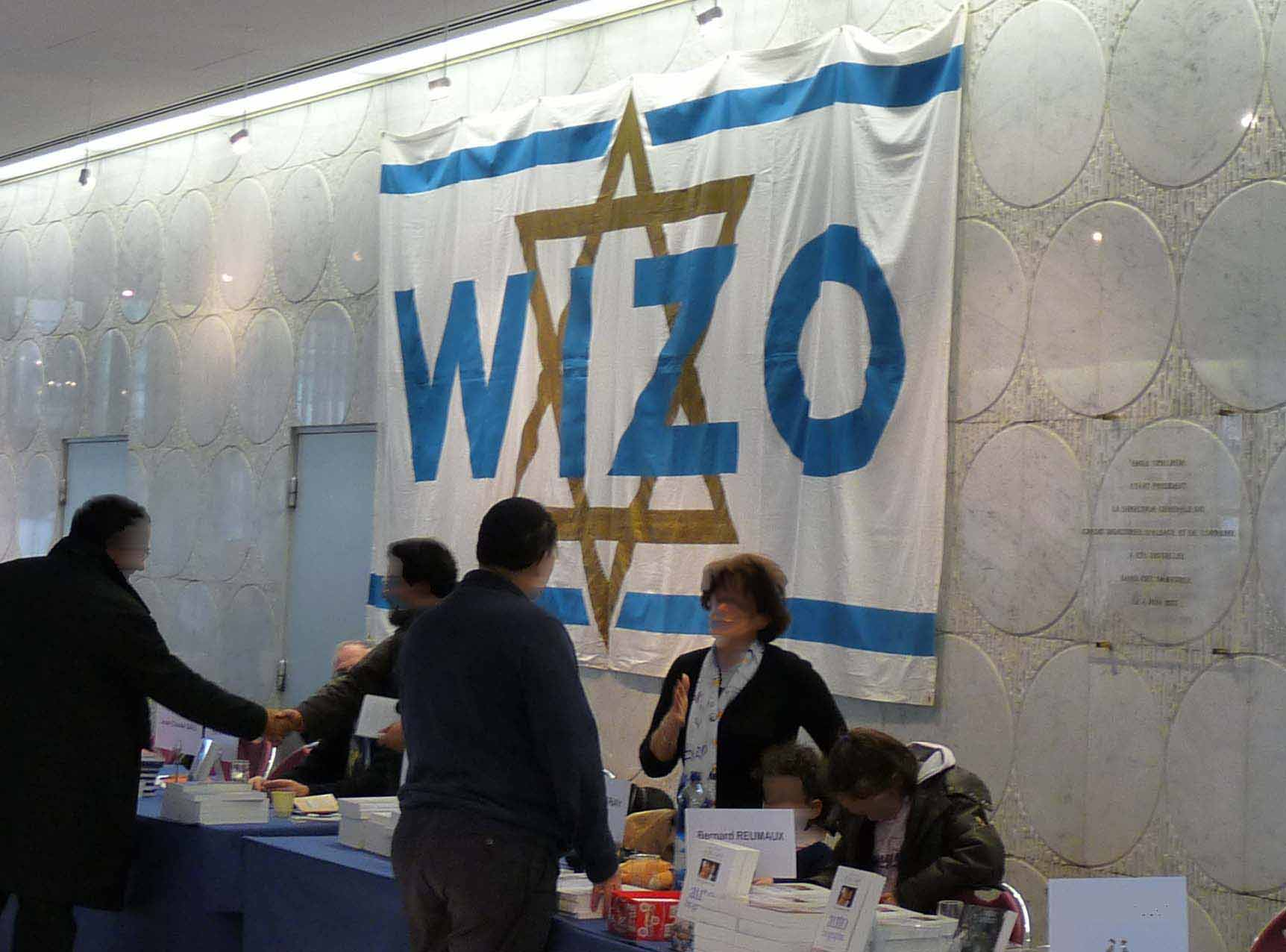
WIZO book fair in Strasbourg, France, 2009

Today, WIZO runs 180 day care centers in Israel, caring for 14,000 children of working mothers, new immigrants and needy families. The organization also runs summer camps, courses for single-parent families and therapeutic frameworks for children removed from their homes by court order.

WIZO is now the largest women's Zionist organization in the world. In 2008, 36 member countries sent delegates to Israel to celebrate the organization's 88th birthday.

The current World WIZO president is Anat Vidor, who replaced Esther Mor in January 2024.

== See also ==
- List of Israel Prize recipients
- WIZO Haifa Academy of Design and Education
