= Ya'akov Geri =

Israeli lawyer

- יעקב גרי
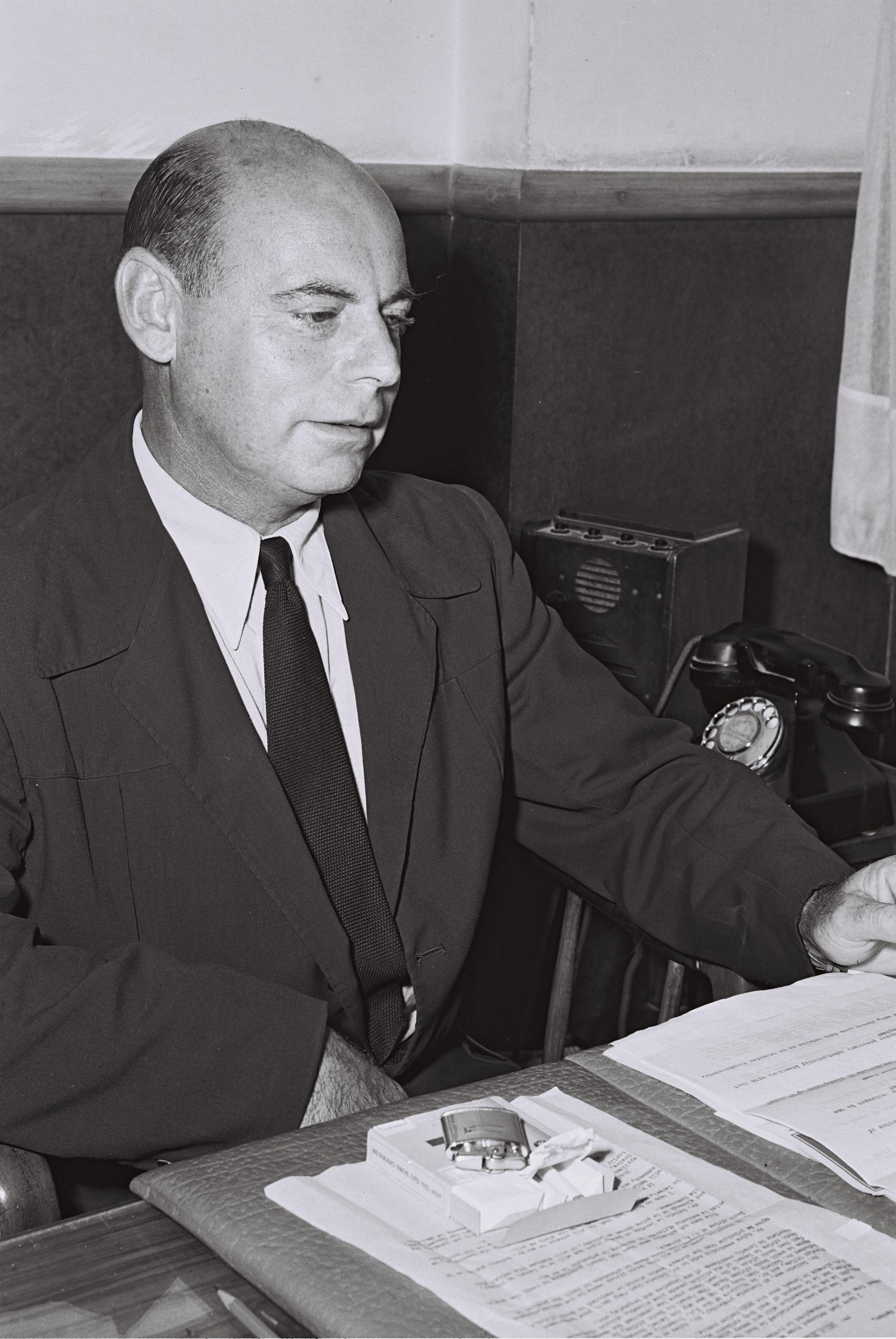
- Geri in 1950

Ministerial roles
- 1950–1951: Minister of Trade and Industry

Personal details
- Born: 18 September 1901; Seda, Russian Empire
- Died: 18 December 1974 (aged 73)

Ya'akov Geri (Hebrew: יעקב גרי; 18 September 1901 – 18 December 1974), also known as Jack Gering, was an Israeli lawyer who served as Minister of Trade and Industry between November 1950 and October 1951, although he never was a Knesset member.

Born in Seda in the Russian Empire (today in Lithuania), Geri later moved to South Africa. He studied law and humanities at the University of the Witwatersrand and the University of Johannesburg, and worked as a lawyer for several years before emigrating to Mandatory Palestine in 1934. After arriving in Israel he initially worked for Dov Yosef's law firm before being appointed secretary of the Africa Palestine Investment Company in 1935.

On 1 November 1950 Geri was appointed Minister of Trade and Industry in David Ben-Gurion's second government, a post he held until 8 October 1951. After his term as Minister he became head of a group of South African companies in Israel.
