= Hebrew Communists =

Hebrew Communists קומוניסטים עברים
- Founded: 1945
- Dissolved: August 1949
- Split from: Palestine Communist Party (1945)
- Merged into: Mapam (1949)
- Ideology: Communism
- Political position: Far-left
- Most MKs: 1 (1949)
- Fewest MKs: 1 (1949)

The Hebrew Communists (Hebrew: קומוניסטים עברים, Komunistim Ivrim) were a short-lived political party in Mandatory Palestine and Israel.

== History ==
In 1940 a group of friends led by Shmuel Ettinger left the Palestine Communist Party to form a new party named "Emet" (Truth), whose primary goal was the establishment of a Jewish state. In 1942, after the Palestine Communist Party was legalised, Ettinger's group rejoined it. However, their reunion was short-lived, and they left the party again a year later.

A new party, the Communist Education Association, was established in 1945. Growing to around 500 members, it was renamed the Communist Union of Palestine, before becoming the Hebrew Communist Party in June 1947. Later in the year the party was invited to merge into Mapam. However, the party remained independent and contested the January 1949 Constituent Assembly elections as part of the Maki-led "Communist and Independent List for Independence, Democracy and Peace", which won five seats.

In 1949 Maki adopted an anti-Zionist position. As a result, Hebrew Communists member Eliezer Preminger split from the Maki faction and created the Hebrew Communists faction on 8 June 1949. The faction ceased to exist again on 15 August 1949 when Preminger joined Mapam. In the same month, the party was dissolved, with a party convention resolution advising members to also join Mapam.
