= Tova Sanhadray =

Israeli politician

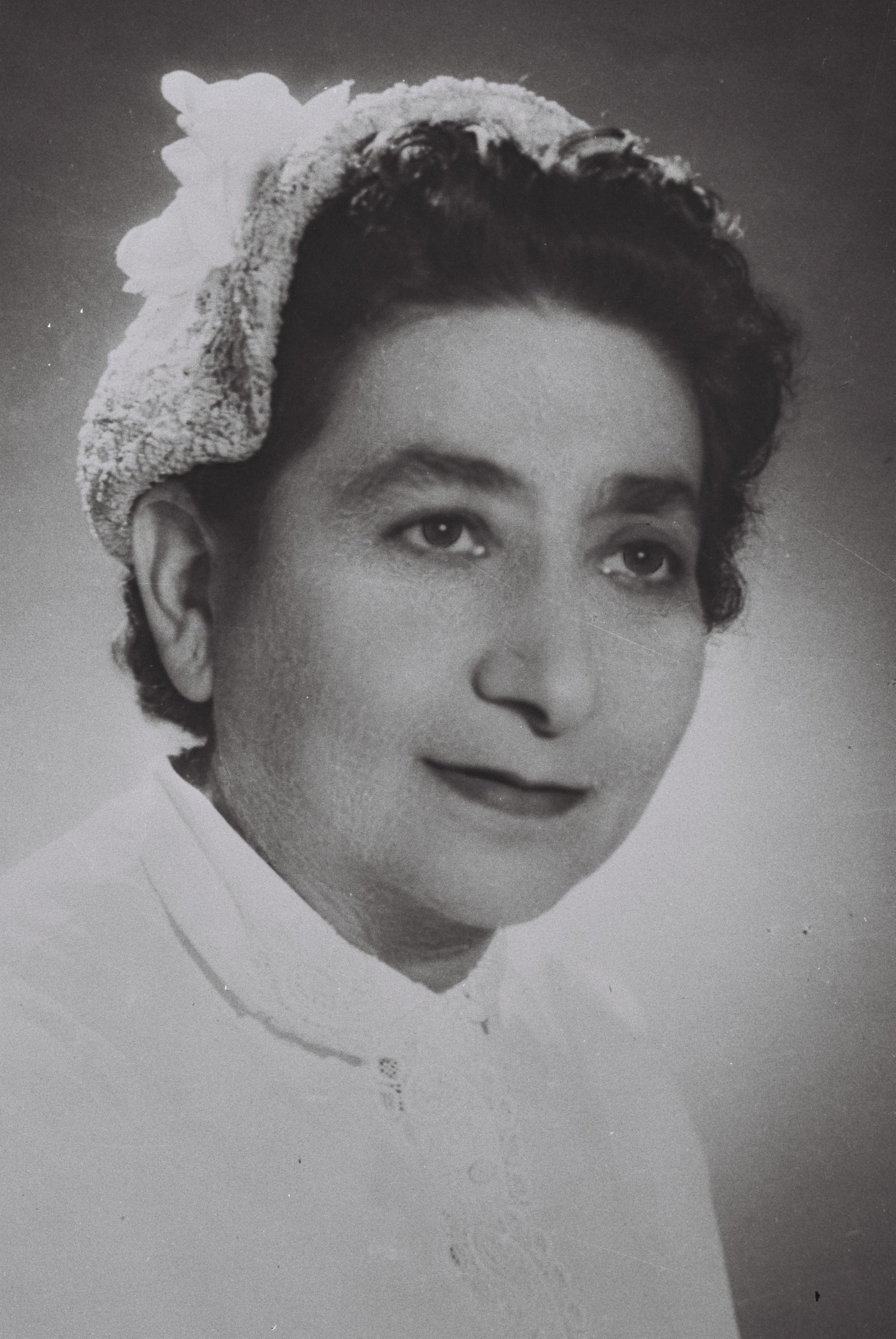
- Sanhadray in 1959

Faction represented in the Knesset
- 1959–1974: National Religious Party

Personal details
- Born: 23 September 1906 Ternopil, Austria-Hungary
- Died: 31 August 1993 (aged 86)

Tova Sanhadray-Goldreich (Hebrew: טובה סנהדראי גולדרייך, née Diamond, 23 September 1906 – 31 August 1993) was an Israeli politician who served as a member of the Knesset for the National Religious Party between 1959 and 1974.

== Biography ==
Tova Diamond (later Sanhadray-Goldreich) was born in Ternopil in Galicia in Austria-Hungary (today in Ukraine). She became involved in Mizrachi and Hapoel HaMizrachi during her twenties, and helped establish Bnot Mizrachi. She also taught Hebrew.

She made aliyah from Poland to Mandatory Palestine in 1934 and initially lived in Tel Aviv. In 1935 she helped establish the Hapoel HaMizrachi Women Workers organisation, and the following year was elected its secretary general, heading the movement for the next fifty years. During this time, she also played a key role in the early development of Emunah, helping to establish its women’s programs and initiatives. In the same year she married Rabbi Yisrael Sanhadray. After his death in 1966 she married Rabbi Kalman Goldreich.

== Political career ==
Prior to the 1949 Knesset elections, the ultra-Orthodox parties, Agudat Yisrael and Poalei Agudat Yisrael formed an alliance (named the United Religious Front) with Mizrachi and Hapoel HaMizrachi, with the condition that no women would be on the alliance's list. In protest, Sanhadray formed a new list, Working and Religious Women, which ran in the election. However, it won only 0.6% of the vote, failing to cross the 1% electoral threshold.

In elections in 1951 and 1955 Sanhadray was given an unrealistic place on the Hapoel HaMizrachi and National Religious Party (NRP) lists. However, she entered the Knesset after the 1959 elections, becoming the first woman to represent the NRP. She was re-elected in 1961, 1965 and 1969. In 1963 she was appointed Deputy Speaker, a role she retained until she lost her seat in the 1973 elections.

She died in 1993 at the age of 86.
