= Dov Yosef =

Israeli statesman (1899–1980)

Dov Joseph
- דב יוסף
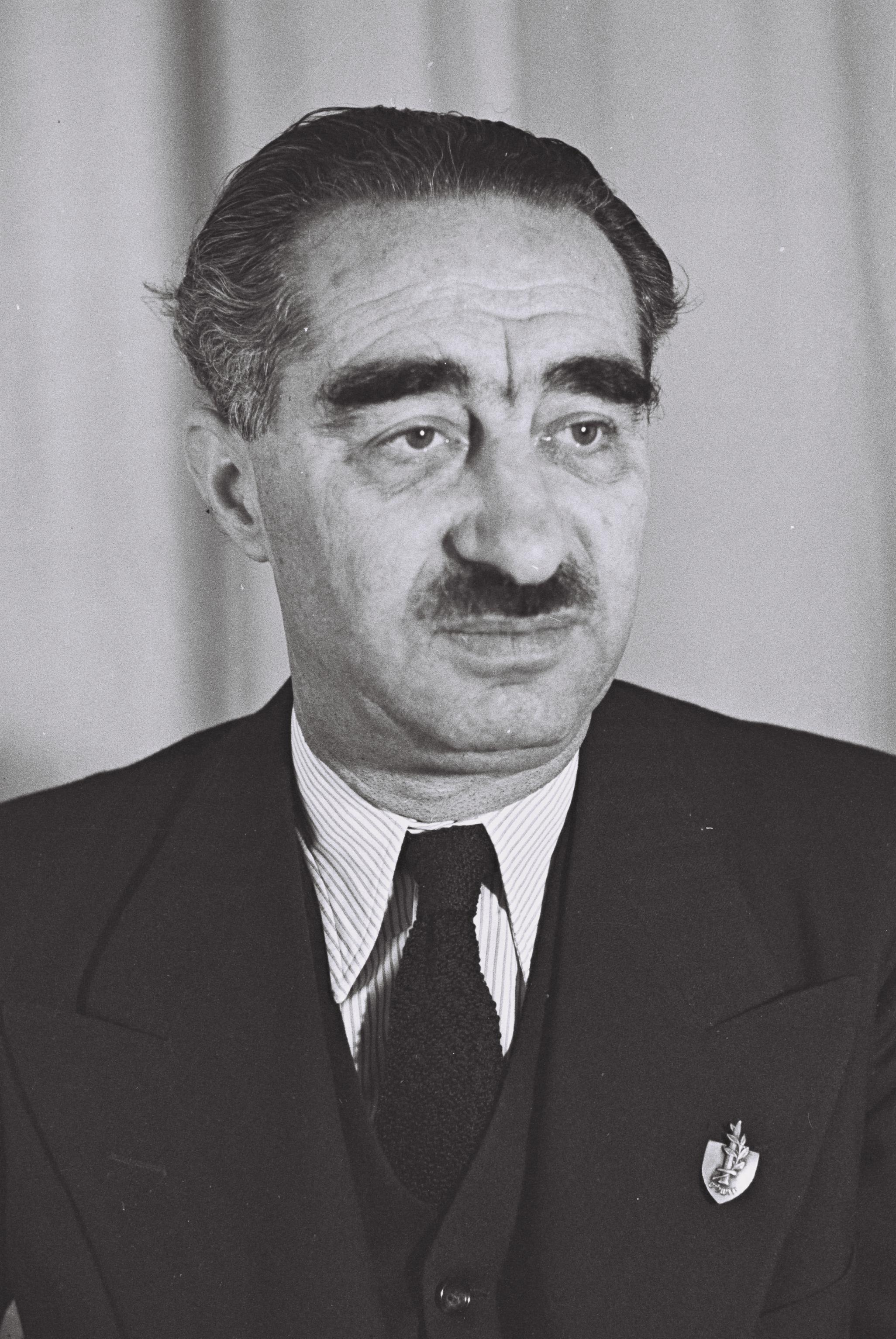

Ministerial roles
- 1949–1950: Minister of Rationing & Supply
- 1949–1950: Minister of Agriculture
- 1950–1951: Minister of Transportation
- 1951–1952: Minister of Justice
- 1951–1952: Minister of Trade & Industry
- 1952–1953: Minister without Portfolio
- 1953–1955: Minister of Development
- 1955: Minister of Health
- 1961–1966: Minister of Justice

Faction represented in the Knesset
- 1949–1959: Mapai

Personal details
- Born: 27 May 1899 Montreal, Quebec, Canada
- Died: 7 January 1980 (aged 80) Tel Aviv, Israel

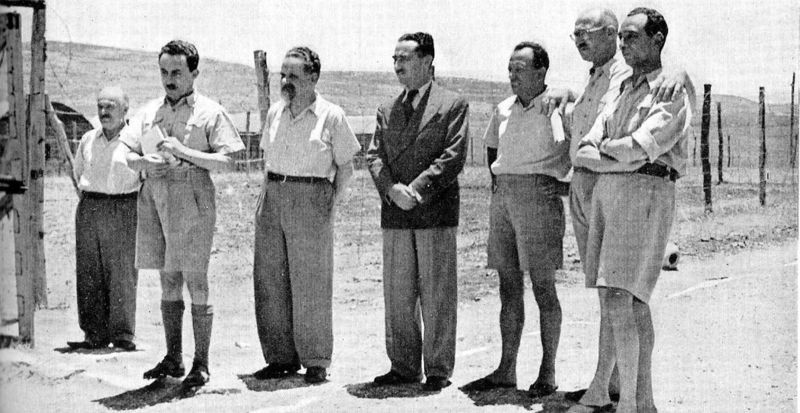
Zionist leaders, arrested in Operation Agatha, in detention in Latrun (l-r): David Remez, Moshe Sharett, Yitzhak Gruenbaum, Dov Yosef, Mr. Shenkarsky, David Hacohen, and Mr. Halperin (Isser Harel) (1946)

Dov Joseph (Hebrew: דב יוסף; 27 May 1899 – 7 January 1980) was an Israeli statesman. During the 1948 Arab–Israeli War, he was in charge of Jerusalem. He later held ministerial positions in nine Israeli governments.

== Biography ==
Bernard Joseph (later Dov Joseph) was born in Montreal, Quebec, Canada. He attended McGill University, Université Laval, and the University of London, qualifying as an attorney. Joseph founded the Canadian Young Judaea Zionist youth movement in 1917, and immigrated to Palestine in 1918 with the Canadian Jewish Legion which he helped organize. After the end of World War I, Yosef worked as an attorney in Mandatory Palestine.

In December 1947 the Jewish Agency and Ben Gurion appointed him head of the Jerusalem Emergency Committee; he continued to serve in that position during the early part of the 1948 Arab-Israeli War, during the Blockade. On August 2, 1948, he was appointed Military Governor of Jerusalem. (Both of his daughters fought in the war, and his younger daughter was killed in it.)

== Political career ==
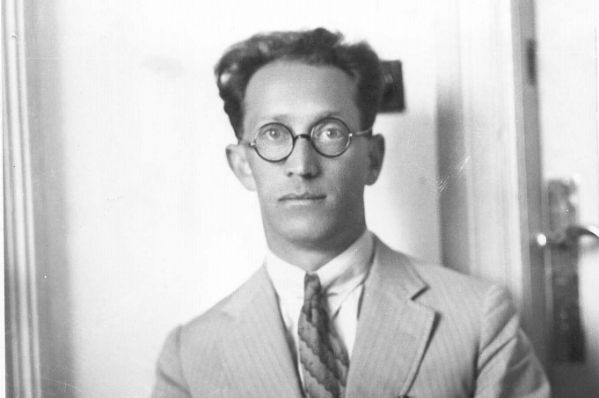
Dov Yosef, 1930s

In 1933 Joseph joined David Ben-Gurion's Mapai. Three years later he became legal adviser to the Political Department of the Jewish Agency. He became a member of the Jewish Agency Executive Committee and a member of the World Zionist Organization's Political Committee.

He was elected to the first Knesset in January 1949. He was initially appointed Minister of Rationing and Supply in the first government, a key position during the austerity period. In June 1949 he was also appointed Agriculture Minister.

The first government collapsed in October 1950 due to wranglings over refugee camps and religious education, but also because Ben-Gurion wanted the Rationing and Supply Ministry closed down. The Prime Minister got his way, and in the new government Yosef was moved to the transportation ministry.

He retained his seat in the 1951 elections, and was appointed as both Minister of Justice and Minister of Trade and Industry, losing the former portfolio in June 1952. After the government collapsed again over the issue of religious education in December 1952, Yosef was initially appointed Minister without Portfolio in the new government, before switching to the Development Ministry in June 1953. He retained this position in the new government formed by Moshe Sharett after Ben-Gurion had resigned to go and live on Kibbutz Sde Boker. After Sharett resigned and formed a new government again in 1955, Yosef remained Development Minister, but also became Minister of Health.

He retained his seat again in the 1955 elections, but was not appointed to a ministerial post. He lost his seat in the 1959 elections, and never regained MK status. However, during the fifth Knesset he was appointed Minister of Justice by Ben-Gurion despite being outside the Knesset. When Ben-Gurion was replaced by Eshkol he remained Justice Minister, but was not reappointed after the 1965 elections.

Joseph caused a political scandal when he published in 1960 an autobiographic book, "The Faithful City", which focused on the siege of Jerusalem in 1948. He claimed that David Shaltiel, the commander of Jerusalem gave him a wrong picture of the situation in the city, causing the fall of the old city.

Streets in Jerusalem, Netanya and Be'er Sheva are named after him.
