= Yemenite Association =

Yemenite Association התאחדות התימנים
- Leader: Saadia Kobashi; Zecharia Glosca; Shimon Garidi; Moshe Mekeitin
- Founded: 1923
- Merged into: General Zionists (1951)
- Ideology: Yemenite Jewish interest
- Most MKs: 1 (1949–1951)
- Fewest MKs: 1 (1949–1951)

Election symbol
- ל ,יענ

The Yemenite Association (Hebrew: הִתְאַחֲדוּת הַתֵּימָנִים, romanized: Hit'ahdut HaTeimanim) was a political party in Israel.

== History ==
The party was founded by Yemenite Jews in 1923. It took part in Israel's first elections in 1949, crossing the electoral threshold by just 53 votes and winning one seat, which was taken by Zecharia Glosca.

Despite the influx of Yemenite Jews to the country precipitated by Operation Magic Carpet, a mass airlift of Jews into Israel from Yemen in 1949–50, the party failed to attract new voters and again won only one seat in the 1951 elections, though this time the electoral threshold was beaten by over a thousand votes. The party's seat was taken by Shimon Garidi.

On 10 September 1951 the party was merged into the General Zionists. On 26 June 1955 Garidi announced that he had seceded from the General Zionists to reform the party, but the move was not recognised by the house committee.

The party fought the 1955 elections independently but failed to cross the electoral threshold. It also contested elections in 1959 (under the name "Yemenite Faction", winning 1,711 votes), 1973 (3,195 votes) and 1988 (909 votes), but failed to cross the electoral threshold.

A later merger of the General Zionists and the Progressive Party led to the formation of the Liberal Party, which became the third largest in the Knesset in the 1961 elections. The Liberal Party then allied with Herut to form Gahal, which eventually became Likud.
