= Austerity in Israel =

Period of economic crisis (1949–1959)

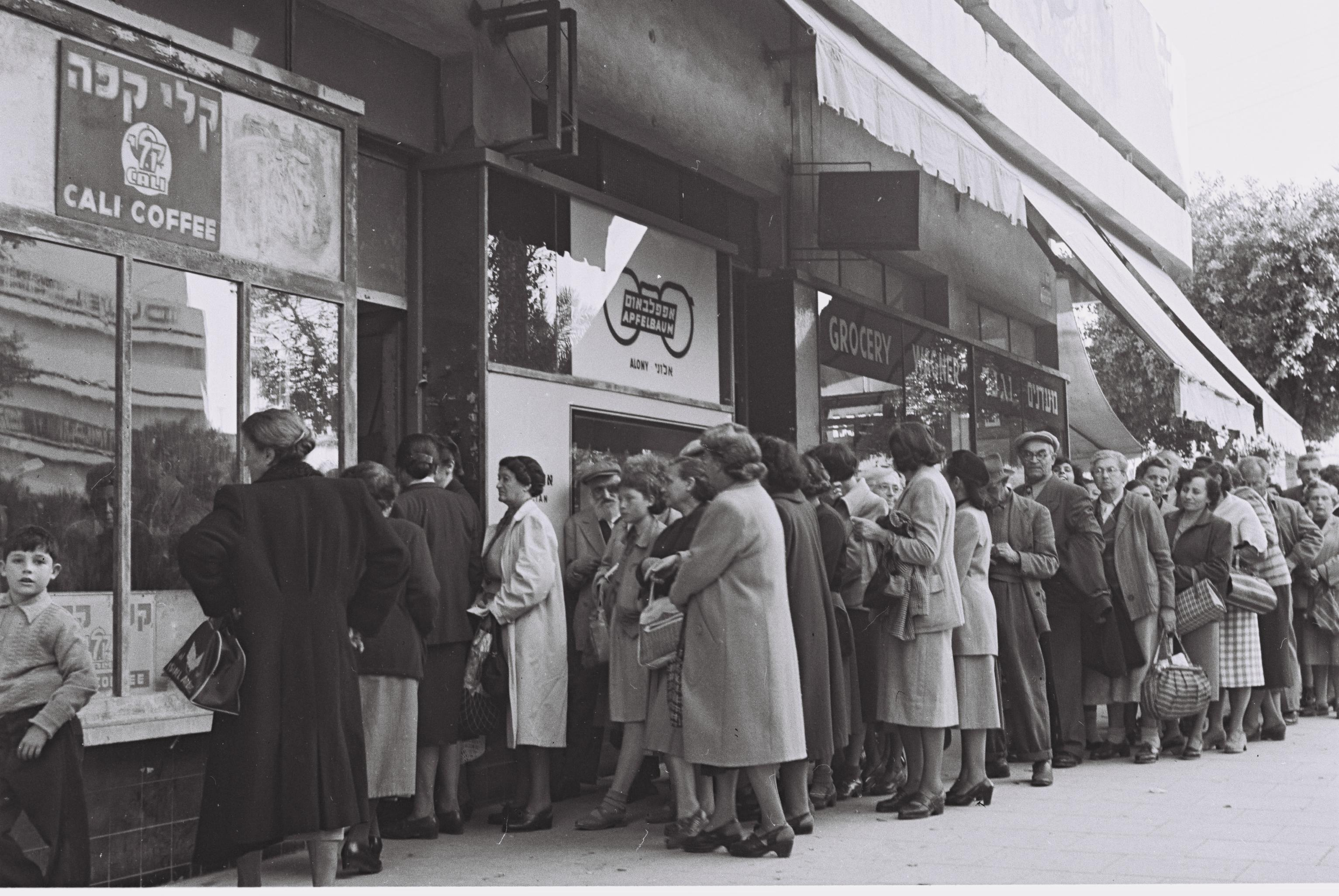
Tel Aviv residents standing in line to buy food rations, 1954

The State of Israel imposed a policy of domestic austerity from 1949 to 1959. It included rationing and other emergency measures to weather the economic crisis in the early days of statehood.

== History ==
After its establishment in 1948, the newly formed State of Israel was on the verge of bankruptcy, lacking in food, resources, and foreign currency. This was largely due to the inherited economic framework of the British Mandatory government that was based on a war time economy.

After the Second World War and the 1948 Palestine War, Israel was war-torn and needed to accommodate an increasing number of Jewish immigrants. Consequently, the Israeli government instigated measures to control and oversee distribution of necessary resources to ensure equal and sufficient rations for all Israeli citizens.

In addition to the problems with the provision of food, national austerity was also required because the state was lacking in foreign currency reserves. Export revenues covered less than a third of the cost of imports, and less than half of the consequent deficit was covered by the Jewish loan system known as Magbiyot (Hebrew: מגביות, lit. 'Collections'). Most financing was obtained from foreign banks and gas companies, which, as 1951 drew to an end, refused to expand the available credit. In order to supervise the austerity, Prime Minister David Ben-Gurion ordered the establishment of the Ministry of Rationing and Supply (Hebrew: משרד הקיצוב והאספקה, Misrad HaKitzuv VeHaAspaka), headed by Dov Yosef.

At first, rationing was set for staple foods alone (cooking oil, sugar and margarine, for instance), but it was later expanded to furniture and footwear. Each month, each citizen would get food coupons worth IL6, and each family was allotted a given amount of foodstuffs. The diet chosen, fashioned after that used in the United Kingdom during World War II, allowed a meager 1,600 calories a day for Israeli citizens, with additional calories for children, the elderly, and pregnant women.

The enforcement of austerity required the establishment of a bureaucracy of quite some proportions, but it proved ineffective in preventing the emergence of a black market in which rationed products, often smuggled from the countryside, were sold at higher prices. In response, the government established in September 1950 the Office for Fighting the Black Market (Hebrew: מטה למלחמה בשוק השחור, Mateh LeMilhama BaShuk HaShahor), whose goal was fighting the black market. However, despite the increased supervision, and the specially summoned courts, all such attempts at suppression proved ineffective.

== End of austerity ==
In 1952 the Reparations Agreement between Israel and the Federal Republic of Germany was signed, compensating Israel for confiscation of Jewish property during the Holocaust. The resulting influx of foreign capital was a huge boost to the state's struggling economy, and led to the cancellation of most restrictions in 1953. In 1956, the list of rationed goods was narrowed to just fifteen goods, and it shrank to eleven in 1958. Shortly afterwards, it was abolished for all goods except jam, sugar and coffee. In 1959, rationing was abolished altogether.

Economically, austerity proved a failure, mostly due to the enormous government budget deficit, covered by bank loans, creating an increase in the amount of money use. Throughout austerity unemployment remained high, and inflation grew as of 1951.

The austerity measures implemented by Israel were not unlike those in the wartime British Empire, which had continued certain severe austerity measures into the post war era. Despite the perceived "unpleasantness" of rationing, they had advantages and disadvantages, and Israel maintained a growing population of immigrants from Europe and Arab Nations.
