= 1949 Israeli Constituent Assembly election =

- 25 January 1949
- Turnout: 86.88%
Party	Leader	Vote %	Seats
Mapai	David Ben-Gurion	35.72	46
Mapam	Yitzhak Tabenkin	14.73	19
United Religious Front	Yehuda Leib Maimon	12.19	16
Herut	Menachem Begin	11.45	14
General Zionists	Israel Rokach	5.21	7
Progressive Party	Pinchas Rosen	4.09	5
Sephardim and Oriental Communities	Bechor-Shalom Sheetrit	3.52	4
Maki	Shmuel Mikunis	3.48	4
Democratic List of Nazareth	Seif el-Din el-Zoubi	1.70	2
Fighters' List	Nathan Yellin-Mor	1.23	1
WIZO	Rachel Cohen-Kagan	1.19	1
Yemenite Association	Zecharia Glosca	1.01	1
This lists parties that won seats. See the complete results below.
Prime Minister before	Prime Minister after
David Ben-Gurion; Mapai	David Ben-Gurion; Mapai

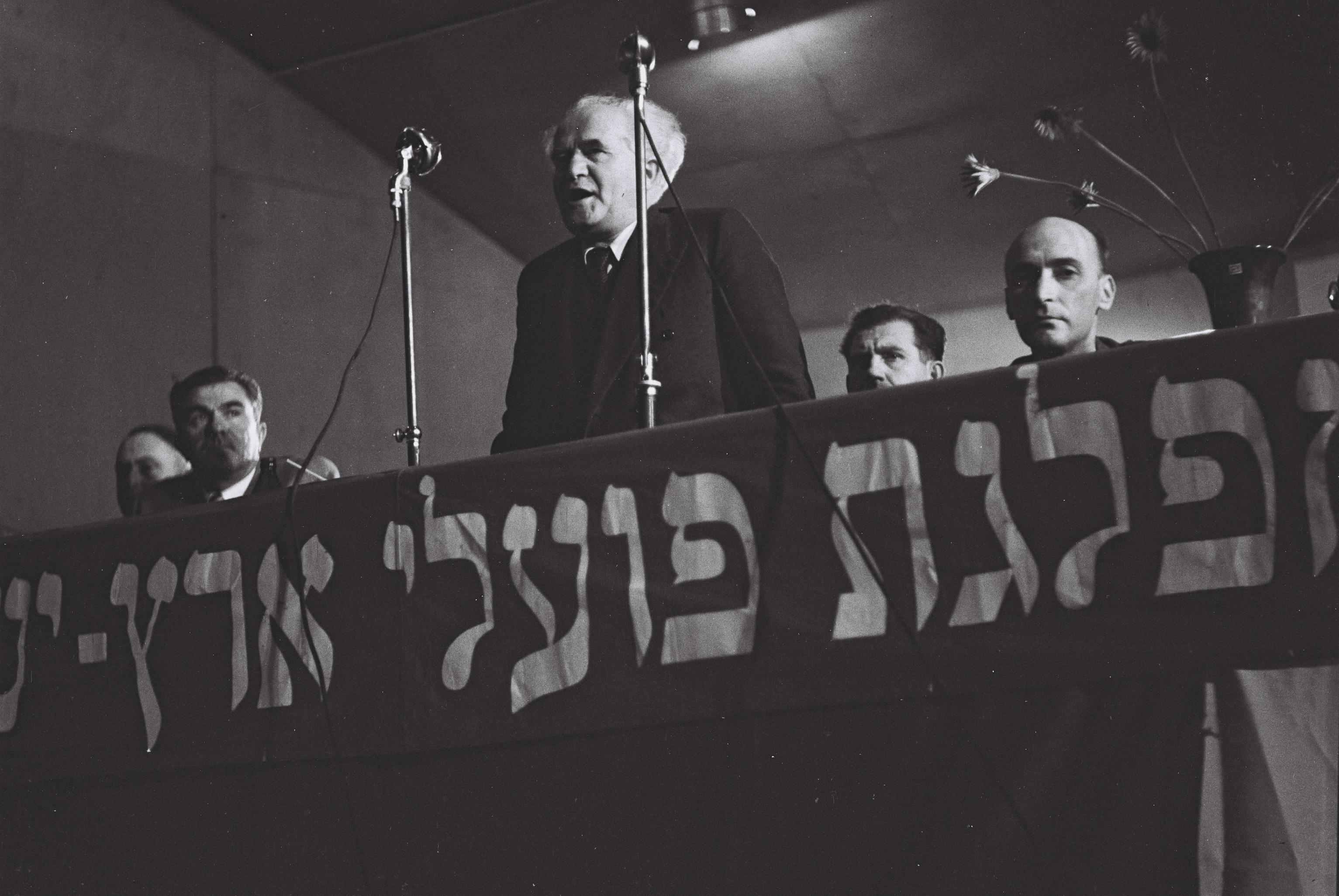
David Ben-Gurion campaigning for Mapai before the election of the Israeli Constituent Assembly, 20 January 1949

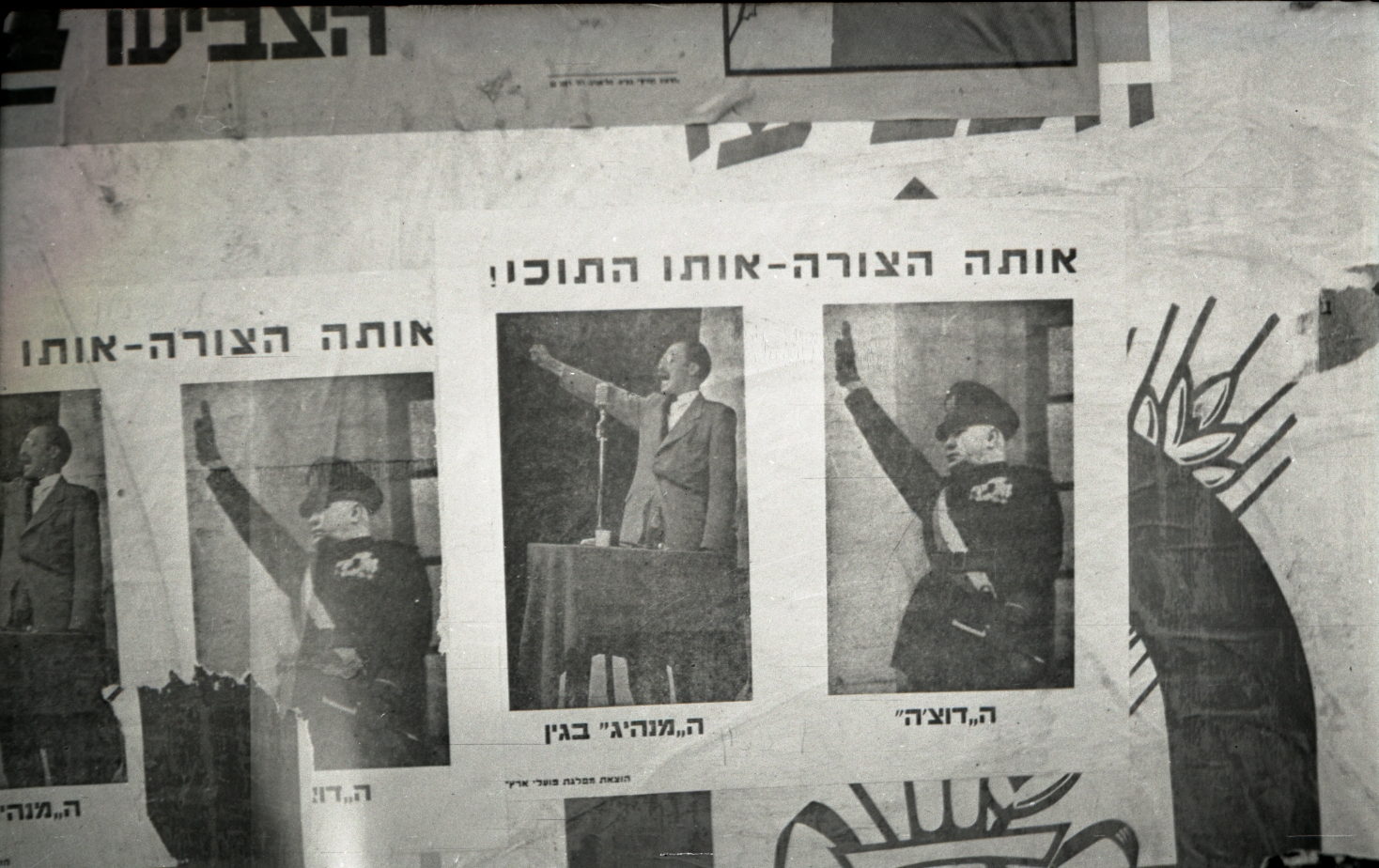
Mapai posters comparing Herut leader Menachem Begin to Italian fascist dictator Benito Mussolini.

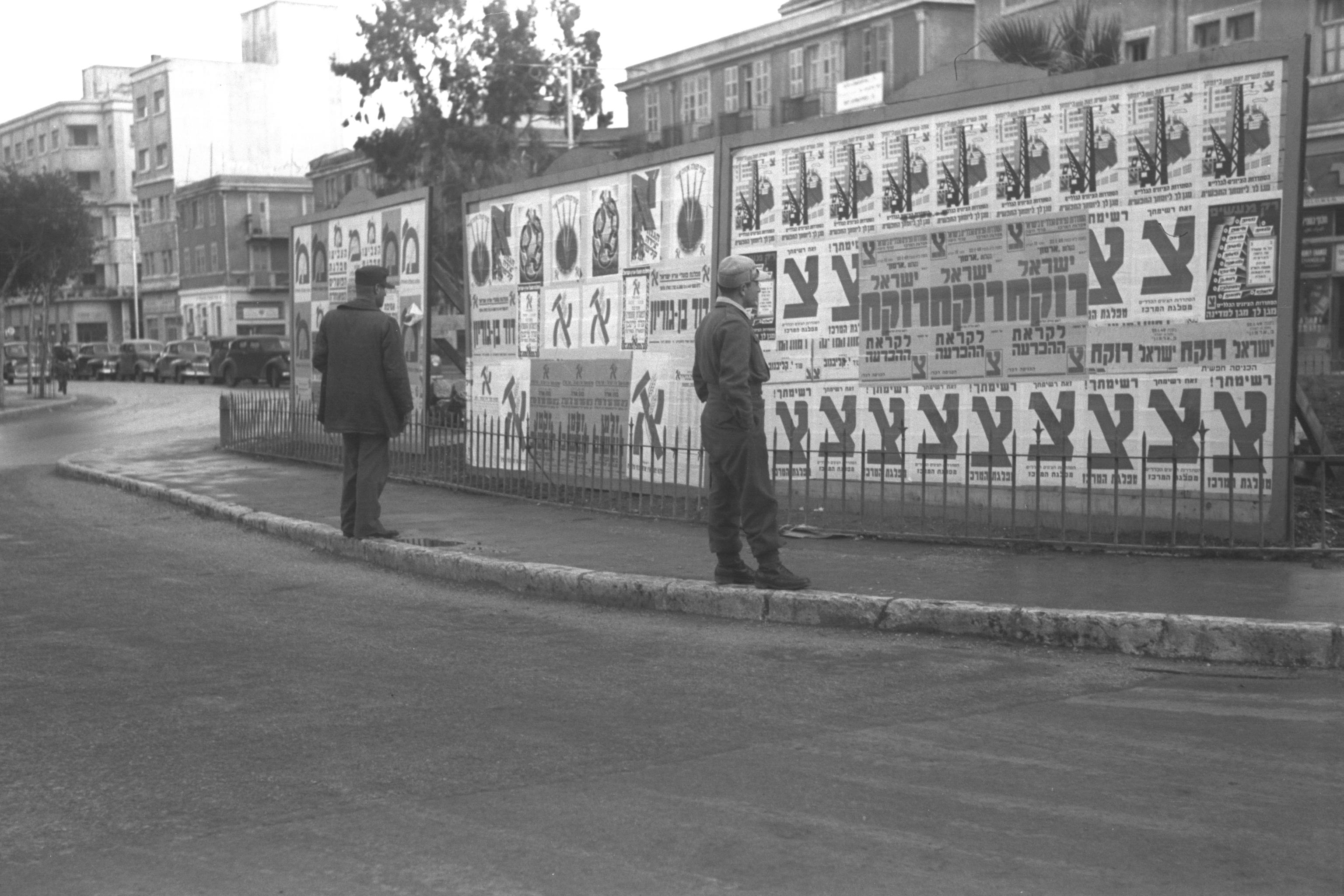
Israeli election posters, 1949

Constituent Assembly elections were held in newly independent Israel on 25 January 1949. Voter turnout was 86.9%. Two days after its first meeting on 14 February 1949, legislators voted to change the name of the body to the Knesset (Hebrew: כנסת, translated as Assembly). It is known today as the First Knesset.

== Background ==
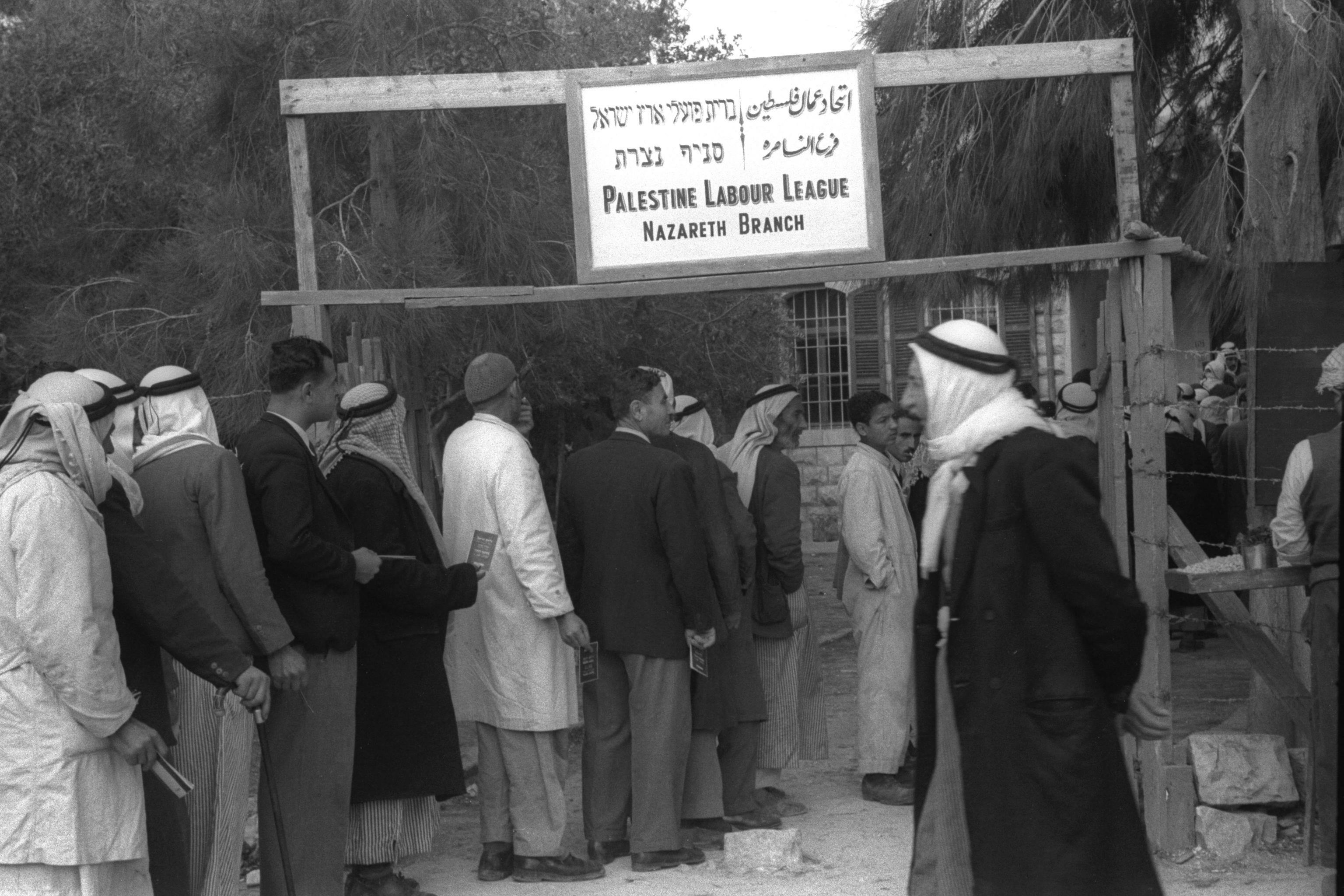
Voting in Nazareth 1949

During the establishment of the state of Israel in May 1948, Israel's national institutions were established, which ruled the new state. These bodies were not elected bodies in the pure sense, and their members originated from the management of the Jewish agency and from the management of the Jewish National Council.

The Israeli Declaration of Independence stated that:

We declare that, with effect from the moment of the termination of the Mandate being tonight, the eve of Sabbath, the 6th Iyar, 5708 (15th May, 1948), until the establishment of the elected, regular authorities of the State in accordance with the Constitution which shall be adopted by the Elected Constituent Assembly not later than the 1st October 1948, the People's Council shall act as a Provisional Council of State, and its executive organ, the People's Administration, shall be the Provisional Government of the Jewish State, to be called "Israel".

However, the elections were not held before the designated date due to the ongoing war and were cancelled twice, while no constitution was ever adopted. The elections were eventually held on 25 January 1949.

== Preparations for the elections ==
These were the first nationwide elections held in Israel and required the creation of an electoral register. A population census was conducted on 8 November 1948, partly to establish the electoral register and issue residents with identification documents. A seven-hour curfew was imposed so that enumerators could record residents at their homes.

On 5 November 1948 the Provisional State Council determined that the Constituent Assembly would have 120 members. The election used nationwide proportional representation, based on the system previously used for elections to the Assembly of Representatives of the Jewish community in Mandatory Palestine. No statutory electoral threshold applied, although the method used to allocate the 120 seats produced a natural threshold of approximately 0.83 per cent of the valid vote.

Approximately 1,000 polling stations were established.

== Contesting parties ==
A total of 21 parties registered to contest the elections.

Party or alliance	Head of list	Ballot letter
Democratic List of Nazareth	Seif el-Din el-Zoubi	יד
Fighters' List	Nathan Yellin-Mor	טו
For Jerusalem List	Daniel Auster	ט
General Zionists	Israel Rokach	צ
Herut	Menachem Begin	ח
Jabotinsky Movement – Brit Hatzohar	Aryeh Altman	ג
Maki	Shmuel Mikunis	ק
Mapai	David Ben Gurion	א
Mapam	Yitzhak Tabenkin	מ
Progressive Party	Pinchas Rosen	פ
Popular Arab Bloc	George Nasser	ת
Sephardim and Oriental Communities	Bechor-Shalom Sheetrit	ס
Traditional Judaism List	Mordechai Boxbaum	יט
Haredi List	Eliyahu Kitov	יח
United List of Religious Workers	Yeshayahu Leibowitz	ש
United Religious Front	Haim Moshe Shapira	ב
WIZO	Rachel Cohen-Kagan	נ
Workers Bloc	'Abd al-Rahman al-Husseini	יא
Working and Religious Women	Tova Sanhadray	פד
Yemenite Association	Zecharia Glosca	ל
Yitzhak Gruenbaum List	Yitzhak Gruenbaum	יג

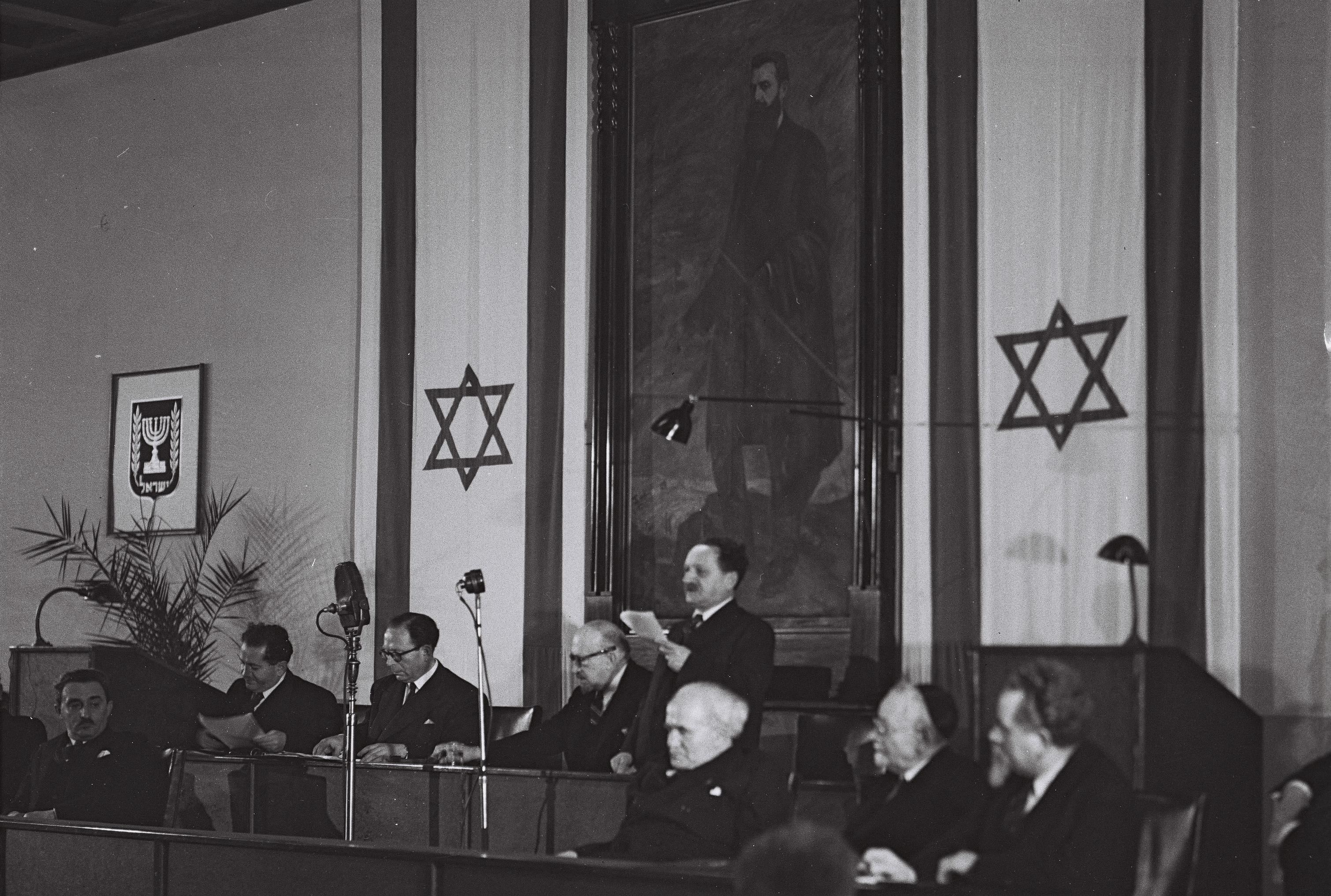
Yosef Sprinzak speaking at the first meeting of the Constituent Assembly.

== Results ==
Party	Votes	%	Seats
Mapai	155,274	35.72	46
Mapam	64,018	14.73	19
United Religious Front	52,982	12.19	16
Herut	49,782	11.45	14
General Zionists	22,661	5.21	7
Progressive Party	17,786	4.09	5
Sephardim and Oriental Communities	15,287	3.52	4
Maki	15,148	3.48	4
Democratic List of Nazareth	7,387	1.70	2
Fighters' List	5,363	1.23	1
Women's International Zionist Organization	5,173	1.19	1
Yemenite Association	4,399	1.01	1
Workers Bloc	3,214	0.74	0
Jabotinsky Movement – Brit HaTzohar	2,892	0.67	0
Haredi List	2,835	0.65	0
Popular Arab Bloc	2,812	0.65	0
Working and Religious Women	2,796	0.64	0
Yitzhak Gruenbaum List	2,514	0.58	0
United List of Religious Workers	1,280	0.29	0
For Jerusalem	842	0.19	0
Traditional Judaism List	239	0.05	0
Total	434,684	100.00	120
Valid votes	434,684	98.77	
Invalid/blank votes	5,411	1.23	
Total votes	440,095	100.00	
Registered voters/turnout	506,567	86.88	
Source: Nohlen et al., Central Election Commission

== Aftermath ==
On 19 May 1948, the Provisional Assembly confirmed Hebrew and Arabic as the official languages of Israel, removing English as an official language. The Constituent Assembly convened in February 1949.

During the Knesset term Eliezer Preminger left Maki and re-established the Hebrew Communists before joining Mapam, while Ari Jabotinsky and Hillel Kook, both associated with the Bergson Group in the United States, broke away from Herut; they were not recognised as a separate party by the speaker.

The painter, Yitzhak Frenkel was commissioned to paint a monumental work (8x6 meters) of the 120 members of the first Knesset, Israel's President and Prime Minister other dignitaries. Following the death of David Remez and the swearing in of the second Knesset the work was halted and the space allocated to the paintings removed. Frenkel was subsequently forced to abandon the project.

=== First government ===
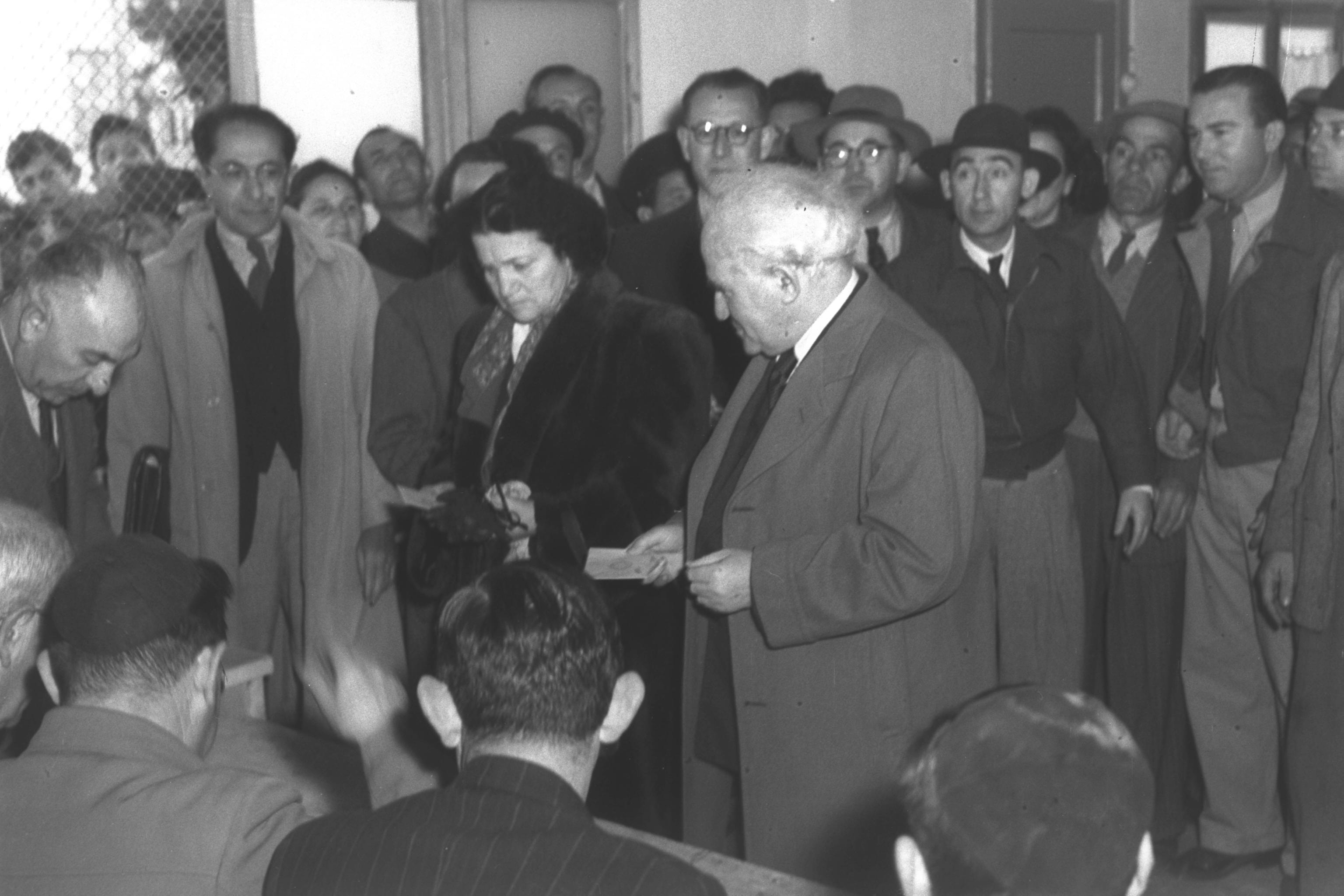
Ben Gurion casting his vote for the Israeli Constituent Assembly

The first government was formed on 8 March 1949 with David Ben-Gurion as Prime Minister. His Mapai party formed a coalition with the United Religious Front, the Progressive Party, the Sephardim and Oriental Communities and the Democratic List of Nazareth, and there were 12 ministers. Yosef Sprinzak of Mapai was appointed as the speaker.

On 16 February 1949, the First Knesset elected Chaim Weizmann as the first (largely ceremonial) President of Israel. It also passed an educational law in 1949 which introduced compulsory schooling for all children between the ages of 5 and 14. On 5 July 1950, it passed the Law of Return.

The trend of political instability in Israel was started when Ben-Gurion resigned on 15 October 1950 over disagreements with the United Religious Front on education in the new immigrant camps and the religious education system, as well as demands that the Supply and Rationing Ministry be closed and a businessman appointed as Minister for Trade and Industry.

The First Knesset when it resided temporarily in the Kesem Movie Theatre in Tel Aviv.

Frumin House, the first official building of the Israeli Knesset

=== Second government ===
Ben-Gurion formed a second government on 1 November 1950 with the same coalition partners as previously, though there was a slight reshuffle in his cabinet; David Remez moved from the Transportation ministry to Education, replacing Zalman Shazar (who was left out of the new cabinet), whilst Dov Yosef replaced Remez as Minister of Transportation. Ya'akov Geri was appointed Minister of Trade and Industry despite not being a Member of the Knesset. There was also a new Deputy Minister in the Transportation ministry.

The door was opened for the elections for the second knesset when the government resigned on 14 February 1951 after the Knesset had rejected the Minister of Education and Culture's proposals on the registration of schoolchildren.

== See also ==
- List of members of the first Knesset
