= Timeline of Ottoman Syria history =

Following are timelines of the history of Ottoman Syria, taken as the parts of Ottoman Syria provinces under Ottoman rule.

== Timeline of history of the parts of Ottoman Syria under Ottoman rule ==
=== 16th century ===
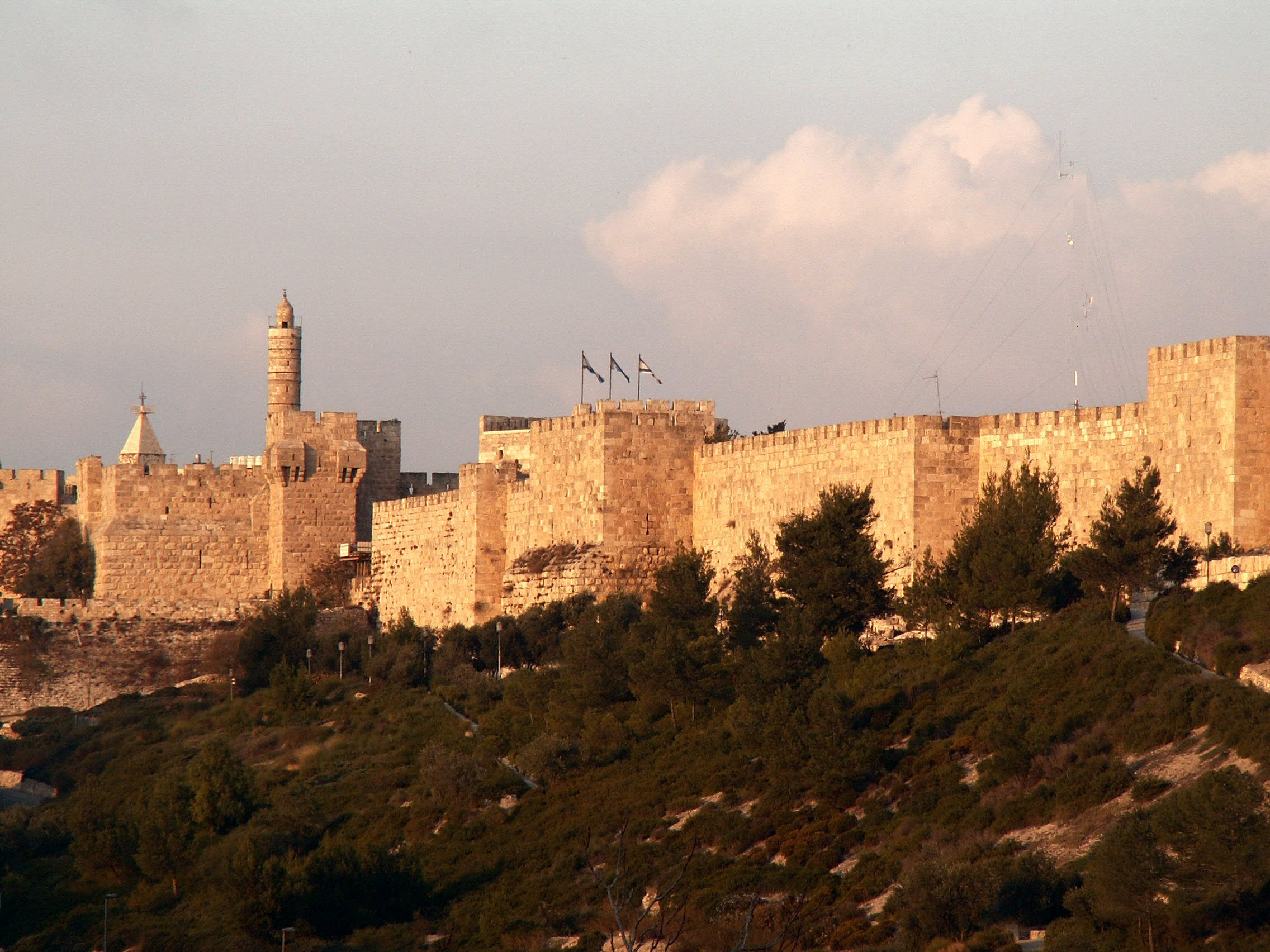
Suleiman the Magnificent rebuilds the Walls of Jerusalem in the mid-1530s

- July 1516 – Selim I of the Ottoman Empire declares war on the Mamluks and invades Syria.
- 1517: The Ottoman Empire captures Jerusalem after Sultan Selim I defeats the last Mamluk Sultan Al-Ashraf Qansuh al-Ghawri at the Battle of Marj Dabiq the previous year. Selim proclaims himself Caliph of the Islamic world.
- 1535–1538: Ottoman Sultan Suleiman I rebuilds the Walls of Jerusalem.
- 1541: Ottoman Sultan Suleiman I sealed off the Golden Gate to prevent the Jewish Messiah's entrance.
- 14 January 1546: A devastating earthquake shook the Levant. The epicenter of the earthquake was in the Jordan River in a location between the Dead Sea and the Sea of Galilee. The cities of Jerusalem, Hebron, Nablus, Gaza and Damascus were heavily damaged.

=== 17th century ===
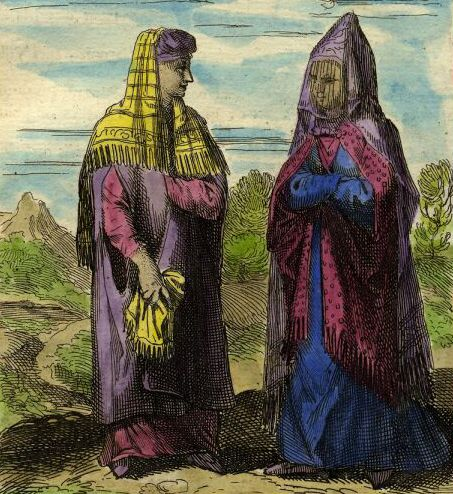
Syrian women, 1683

- 1604: First Protectorate of missions agreed under the Capitulations of the Ottoman Empire, in which Ahmad I agreed that the subjects of Henry IV of France were free to visit the Holy Places of Jerusalem. French missionaries begin to travel to Jerusalem and other major Ottoman cities.
- 1610: the first Arabic printing press in the Arab world founded in Dayr-Qazahya by Maronite monks.
- 1622: Fakhr ad-Din al-Ma'ni, prince of Shouf in Mount Lebanon, defeats at the Battle of Anjar an army led by the Wali (governor) of Damascus Mustafa Pasha.
- 1624: occupied with threat from the Safavids of Iran, the Ottomans agree to make Fakhr ad-Din governor over a region extending from Aleppo to Arish. During his rule, Fakhr ad-Din initiates political and cultural relations with Europe.
- 1633: the Wali of Damascus Ahmed Pasha leads a campaign against Fakhr ad-Din from both land and sea.
- 1635: Fakhr ad-Din is hanged in Damascus.
- 1663–1665: Sabbatai Zevi, founder of the Sabbateans, preaches in Jerusalem before travelling back to his native Smyrna where he proclaimed himself the Messiah

=== 18th century ===
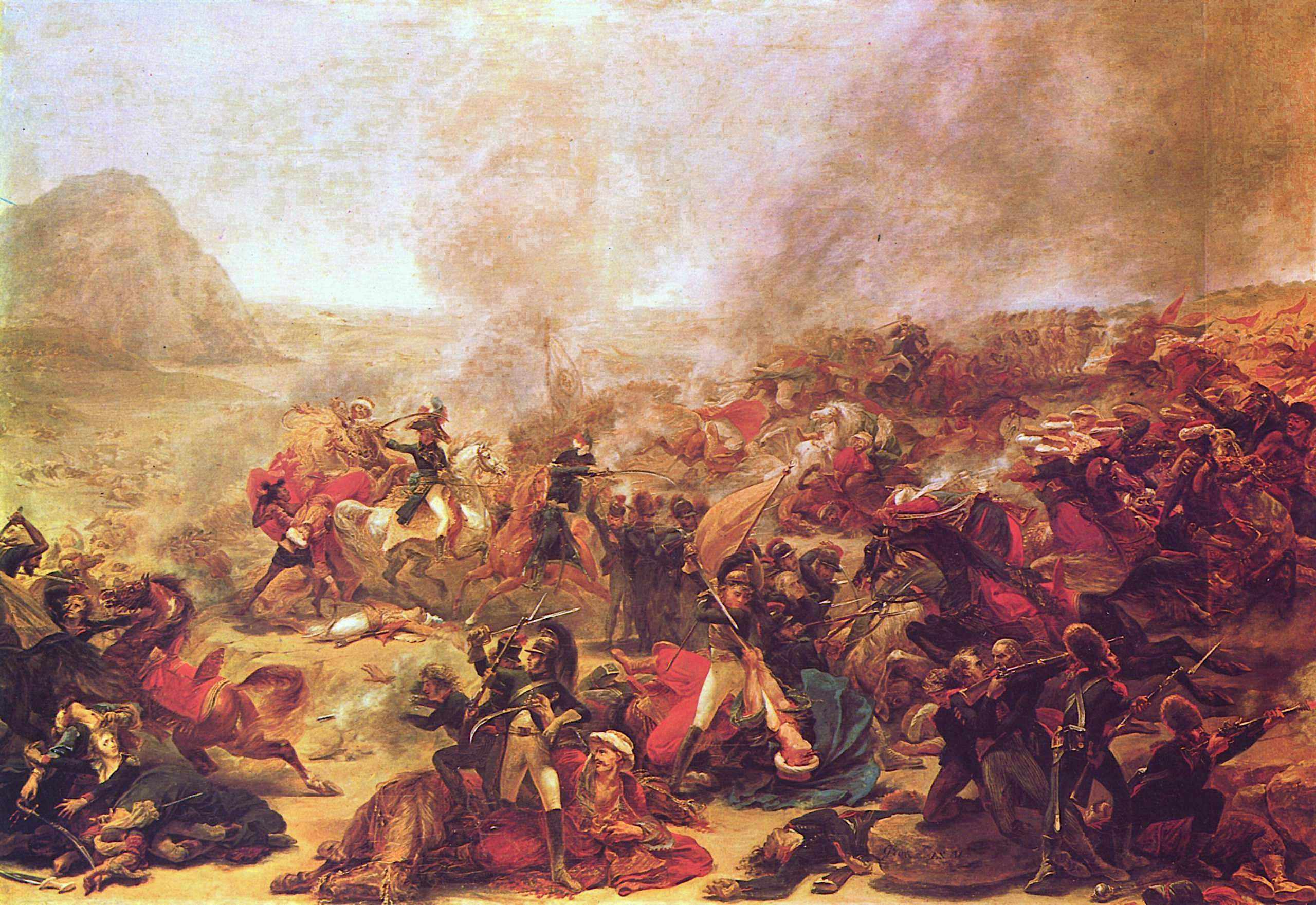
Battle of Nazareth

- 1700: Judah the Pious with 1,000 followers settle in Jerusalem.
- 30 October 1759: A devastating earthquake shook Galilee. The epicenter of the earthquake was in the Jordan River in a location between the Sea of Galilee and the Hula Valley. The cities of Safed, Tiberias, Acre, Sidon were heavily damaged.
- 3–7 March 1799: Napoleonic Wars: Siege of Jaffa – Napoleon captures the city of Jaffa.
- 20 March – 21 May 1799: Napoleonic Wars: Siege of Acre – An unsuccessful attempt by Napoleon to capture the city of Acre.
- 8 April 1799: Napoleonic Wars: Battle of Nazareth
- 11 April 1799: Napoleonic Wars: Battle of Cana
- 16 April 1799: Napoleonic Wars: The Battle of Mount Tabor – Napoleon drives Ottoman Turks across the River Jordan near Acre.

=== 19th century ===
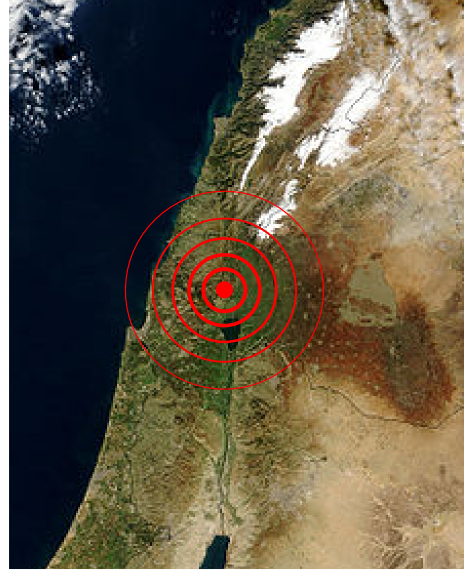
Galilee earthquake of 1837

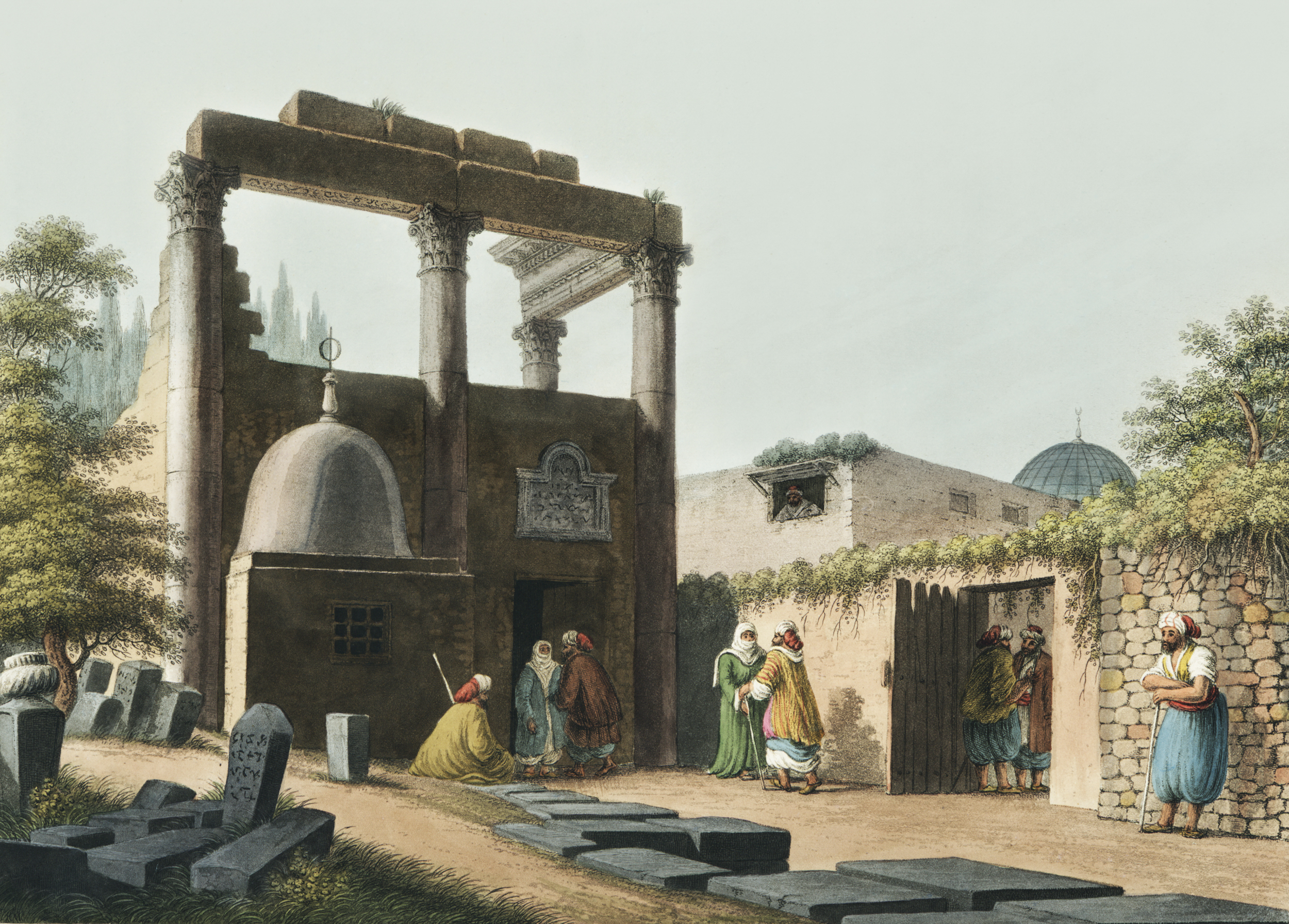
Remains of a peripteral temple and mosque in Lakatia, from an 1810 illustration by Luigi Mayer

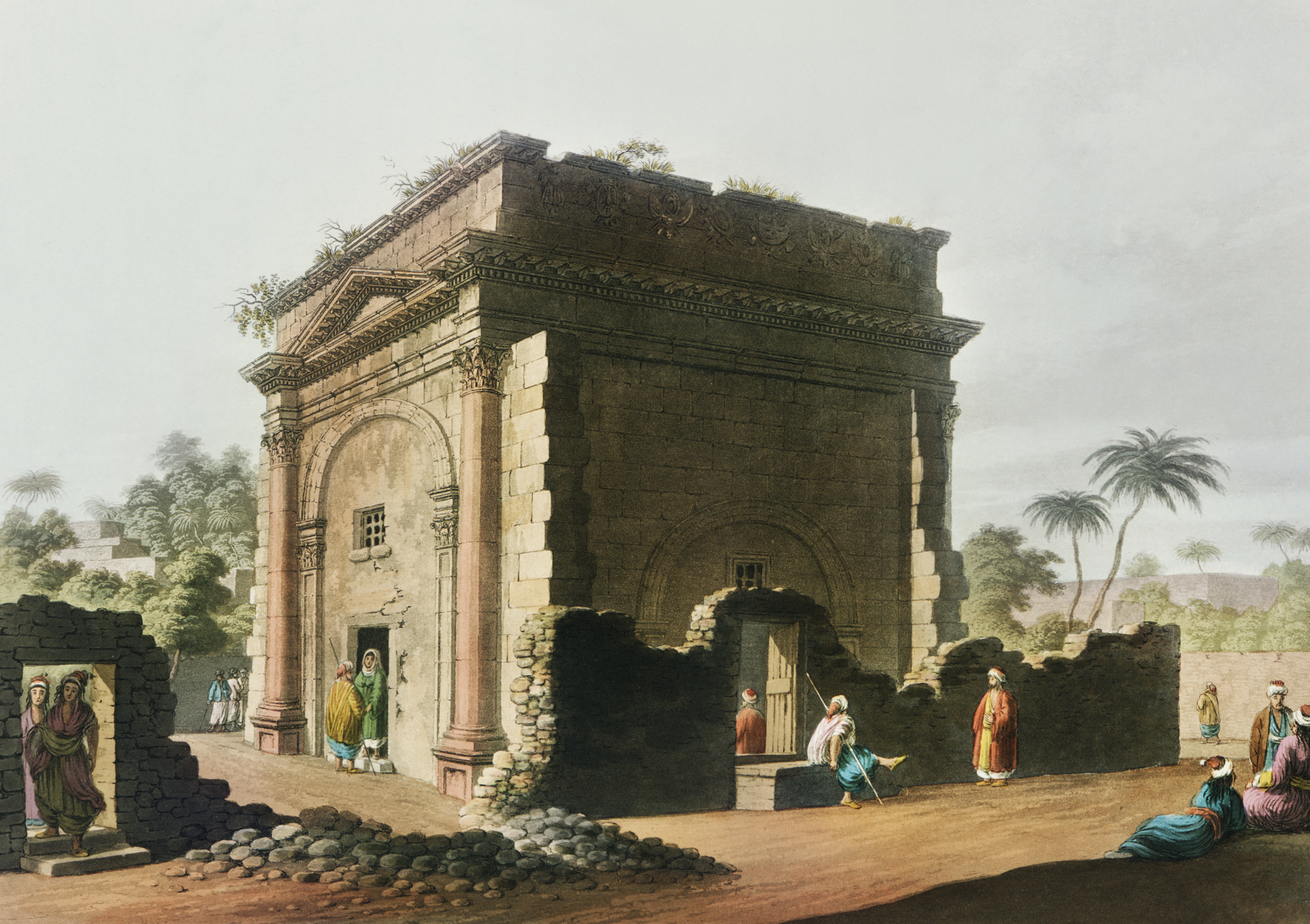
Triumphal Arch of Septimius Severus in Lakatia, by Luigi Mayer

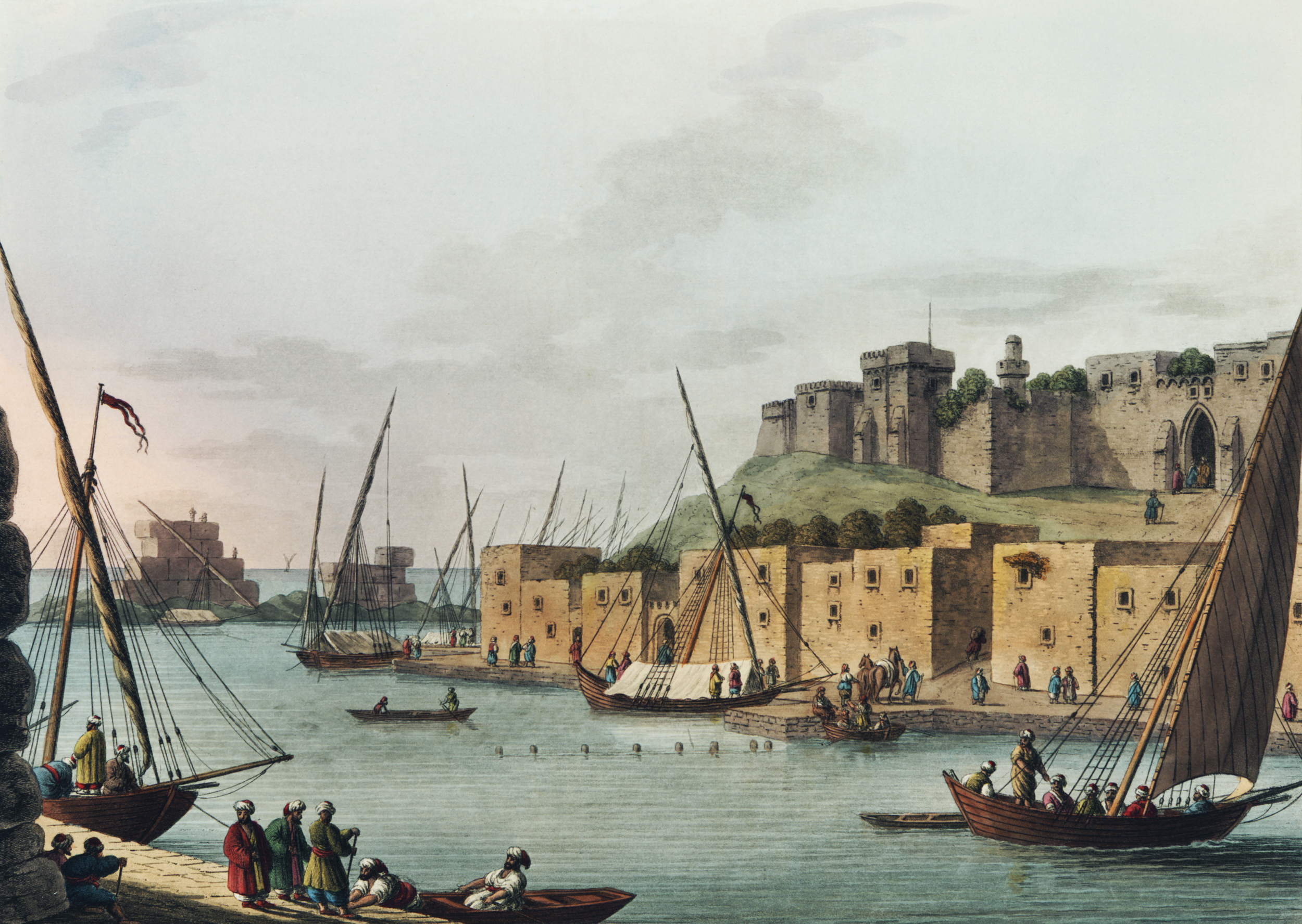
Tartus in Ottoman Syria, by Luigi Mayer

- 1831: Muhammad Ali of Egypt's French-trained forces occupy Syria.
- 1832: an Egyptian Army led by Ibrahim Pasha of Egypt marches on Anatolia and defeats an Ottoman army under Grand Vizier Reshid Pasha at the Battle of Konya.
- 10 May 1832: The Egyptians, aided by Maronites, seize Acre from the Ottoman Empire after a 7-month siege.
- 1833: Western powers broker the Convention of Kutahya. The terms require Muhammad Ali to withdraw his troops from Anatolia and receive the territories of Syria, Crete, and Hijaz in exchange.
- 1834–1835: Syrian Peasant revolts, including Sanjak of Jerusalem, Sidon Eyalet and Aleppo Eyalet.
- 1 January 1837: Galilee earthquake of 1837 – a devastating earthquake the shook the Galilee region, killing thousands of people.
- 1839: The United Kingdom of Great Britain and Ireland, backed by the Russian Empire and the Austrian Empire, compels July Monarchy France to abandon Muhammad Ali of Egypt, and it forces him to return Syria and Arabia to the Ottoman Empire.
- 15 July 1840: The Austrian Empire, the United Kingdom of Great Britain and Ireland, the Kingdom of Prussia, and the Russian Empire sign the Convention of London with the ruler of the Ottoman Empire. The signatories offered to Muhammad Ali and his heirs permanent control over Egypt and the Acre Sanjak, provided that these territories would remain part of the Ottoman Empire and that he agreed within ten days to withdraw from the rest of Syria and returned to Sultan Abdülmecid I the Ottoman fleet which had defected to Alexandria. Muhammad Ali was also to immediately withdraw its forces from Arabia, the Holy Cities, Crete, the Adana District, and all of the Ottoman Empire.
- 1840: The Tanzimat reforms begin to have an impact in Syria.
- 1840: Sectarian clashes in Mount Lebanon between Druze and Christian Maronites.
- 1847: the Syrian Association founded in Beirut.
- 1850: Christians massacred in the Vilayet of Aleppo.
- 1860: The first Jewish neighborhood (Mishkenot Sha'ananim) is built outside the walls of the Old City of Jerusalem.
- 1860: Clashes between Druze and Maronites in Mount Lebanon and Damascus.
- 9 June 1861: European powers led by France intervene on the side of the Maronites and force the Ottomans to establish the Maronite-dominated Mutesarrifiyyet of Mount Lebanon.
- 1868: The American University in Beirut established under the name of the Syrian Protestant College.
- 1868: the Syrian Scientific Society founded in Beirut.
- 1874: Jerusalem Sanjak becomes a Mutesarrifiyyet gaining a special administrative status.
- 1877–1878: The Russo-Turkish War causes increased taxation in Syria.
- 1882–1903: The First Aliyah took place in which 25,000–35,000 Jew immigrants immigrated to Ottoman Syria.
- 1887-8: Ottoman Palestine was divided into Jerusalem Sanjak, Nablus Sanjak and Acre Sanjak.
- 1893: A fire destroys the Great Mosque of Damascus.
- 1895: Construction of railway Beirut–Damascus.
- 1895: Construction of railway line Damascus–Rayek.
- 29–31 August 1897: The First Zionist Congress is held in Basel, Switzerland, in which the Basel Declaration was approved which determined that the Zionist movement ultimate aim is to establish a homeland for the Jewish people in the region of Palestine secured under public law.
- 1898: German Kaiser Wilhelm visits Jerusalem to dedicate the Lutheran Church of the Redeemer. He meets Theodor Herzl outside city walls.

=== 20th century ===
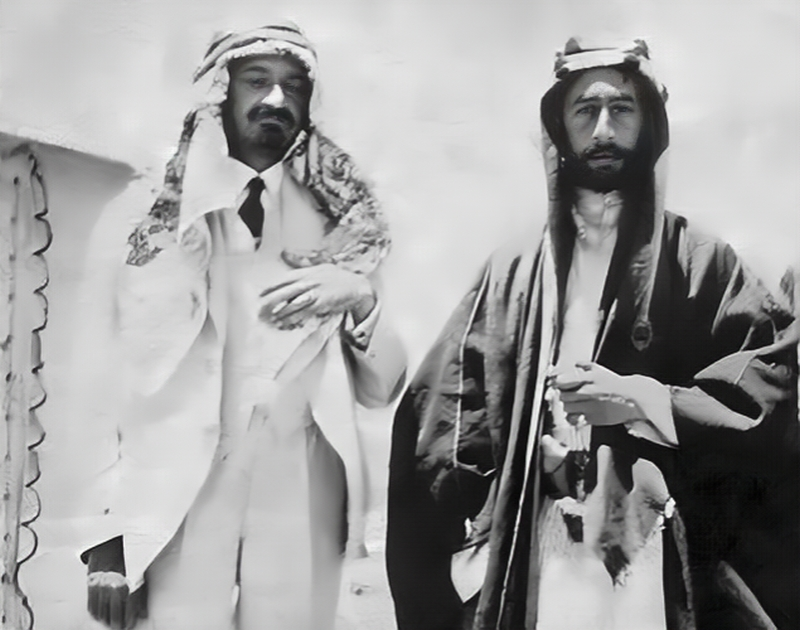
first meeting between Chaim Weizmann (wearing Arab dress as a sign of friendship) and the Hashemite Prince Faisal in Transjordan in an attempt to establish favourable relations between Arabs and Jews in the Middle East, June 1918.

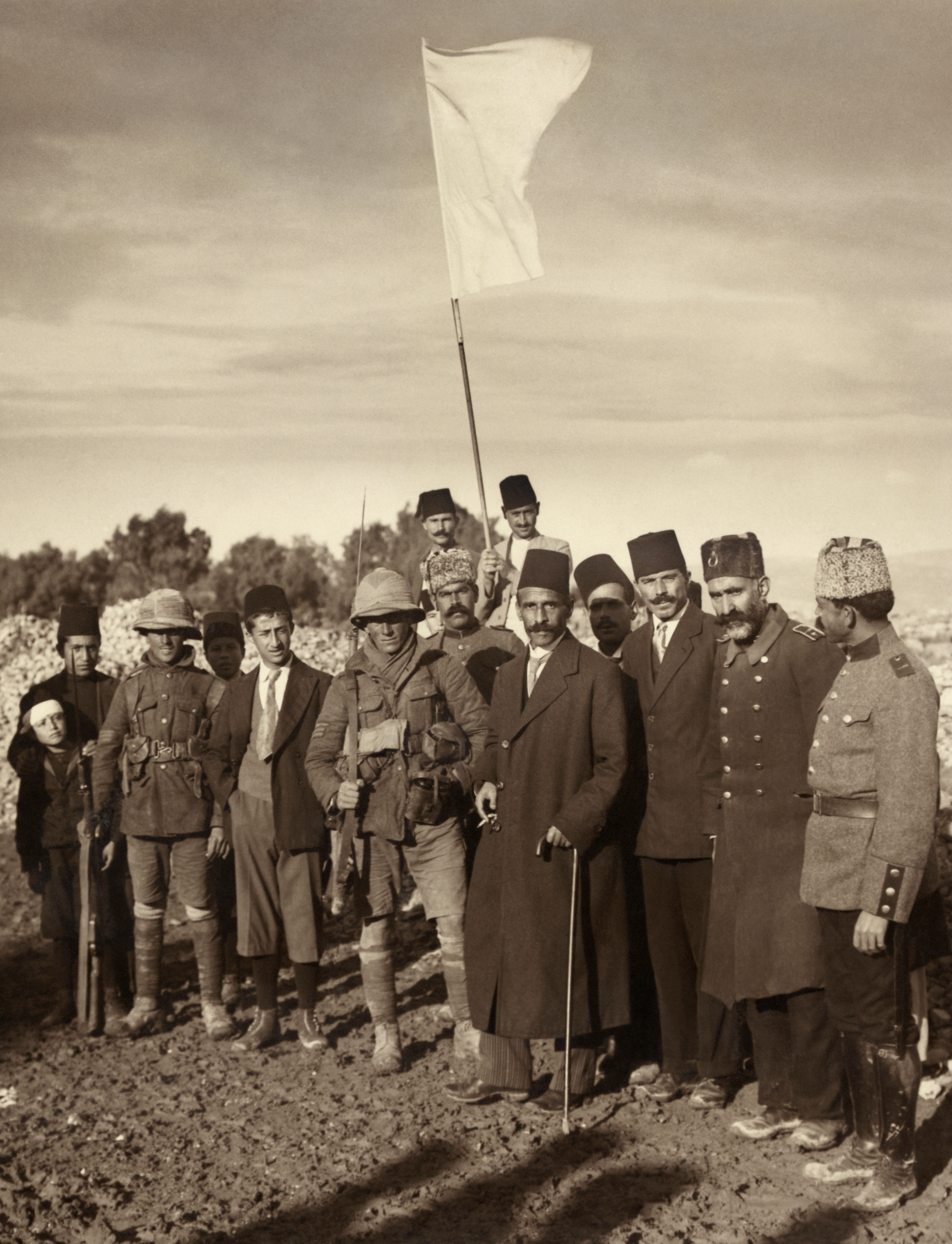
The surrender of Jerusalem to the British, 9 December 1917.

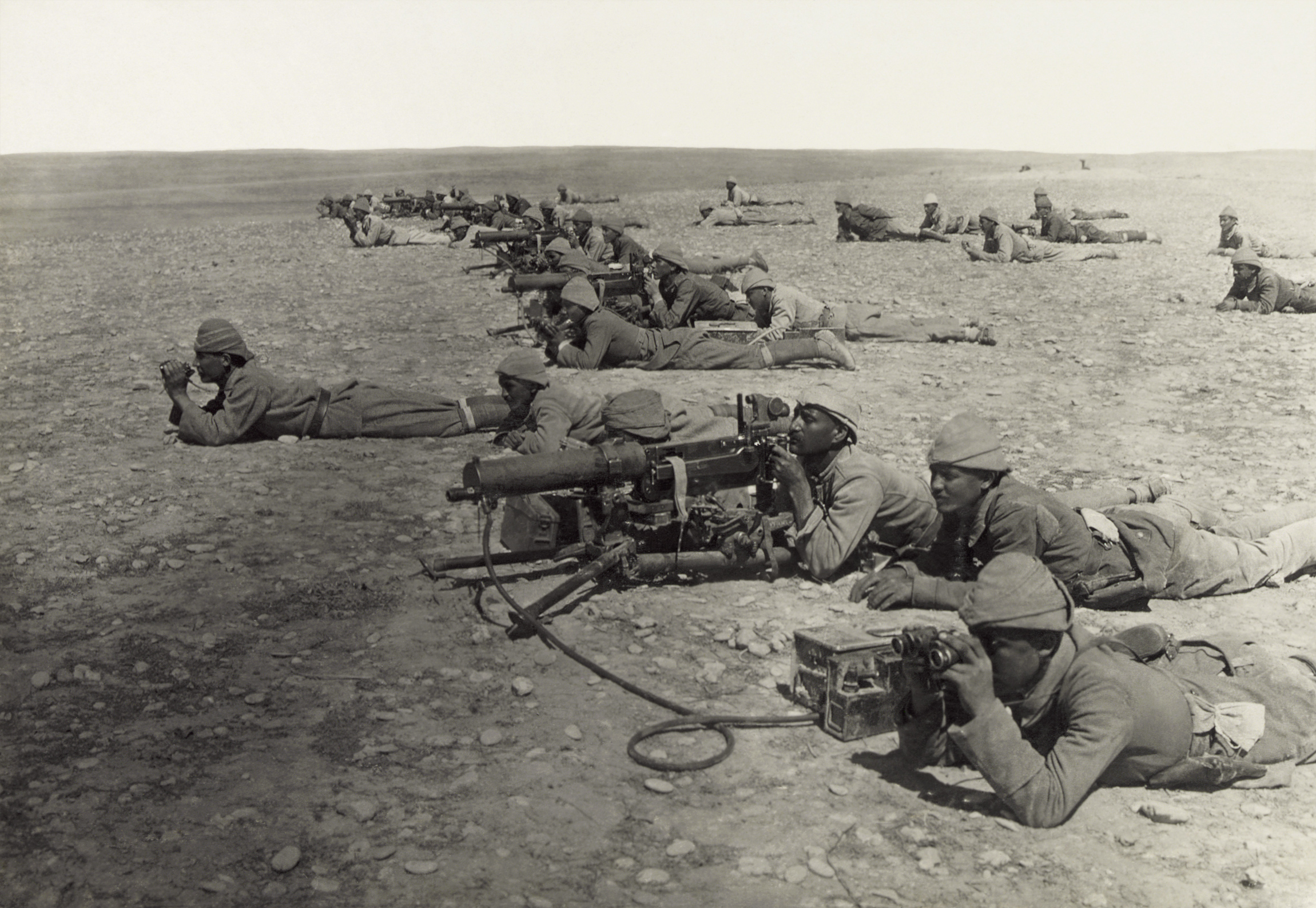
Ottoman machine gun corps at the Tell el Sheria Gaza line, 1917.

- 1900–1908: Hejaz Railway: construction of Railroad Damascus-Medina.*30
- 1901: The Jewish National Fund was founded at the Fifth Zionist Congress in Basel with the aim of buying and developing land in the Galilee Palestine regions of Ottoman Syria for Jewish settlement.
- 1 September 1908: The Hejaz Railway opens.
- 11 April 1909: Tel Aviv was founded on the outskirts of the ancient port city of Jaffa.
- May 1909: Hauran Druze Rebellion erupts.
- 1914: Ottomans fight on the side of the Central Powers in World War I.
- 1915–1917: Famine in Syria resulting in up to 500,000 deaths due to severe shortage of supplies.
- 28 January – 3 February 1915: The British Sinai and Palestine Campaign: First Suez Offensive – A battle between the forces of the Ottoman Empire and the British Empire in which the Turks fail in their attempt to capture or destroy the Suez Canal and are forced to withdraw their forces. The canal was vital to the British war effort.
- March–October 1915: The 1915 locust plague breaks out in region.
- 16 May 1916: Britain and France conclude the secret Sykes-Picot Agreement, which defines their respective spheres of influence and control in Western Asia after the expected demise of the Ottoman Empire after World War I. It was largely a trade agreement with a large area set aside for indirect control through an Arab state or a confederation of Arab states.
- June 1916: Grand Sharif Hussein, the Sharif of Mecca who shared with his fellow Arabs a strong dislike for his Ottoman overlords, enters into an alliance with the United Kingdom and France against the Ottomans and soon thereafter commences what would become known as The Great Arab Revolt against Ottoman rule.
- 1916: The Mutasarrifiyet of Mount Lebanon is abolished.
- 9 January 1917: Sinai and Palestine campaign: Battle of Rafa – British Empire forces defeat the Turks in Rafah and complete the re-conquest of the Sinai Peninsula.
- 26 March 1917: Sinai and Palestine campaign: First Battle of Gaza – British fail to advance into Palestine after 17,000 Turkish troops block their advance.
- 6 April 1917: Sinai and Palestine campaign: The Tel Aviv and Jaffa deportation – The Ottoman authorities deport the entire civilian population of Jaffa and Tel Aviv pursuant to the order from Ahmed Jamal Pasha, the military governor of Ottoman Syria during the First World War. Although the Muslim evacuees are allowed to return before long, the Jewish evacuees were not able to return until after the British conquest of Palestine.
- 19 April 1917: Sinai and Palestine campaign: Second Battle of Gaza – Turkey repels British assault on Gaza–Beersheba line.
- 6 July 1917: Sinai and Palestine campaign: Arabian troops led by T. E. Lawrence capture Aqaba from the Turks, and incorporate the territory into the Kingdom of Hejaz, under the rule of Prince Faisal. The capture of Aqaba helps open supply lines from Lower Egypt to the Arab and British forces in the field further north in Transjordan and Palestine, and more importantly alleviate a threat of a Turkish offensive against the strategically important Suez Canal.
- 31 October 1917: Sinai and Palestine campaign: Battle of Beersheba – Australian and New Zealand cavalry troops capture Beersheba from the Turks.
- 31 October – 7 November 1917: Sinai and Palestine campaign: Third Battle of Gaza – British forces capture Gaza and break the Turkish defensive line in southern Palestine.
- 2 November 1917: The Balfour Declaration is published in which the British Government declares its support for the establishment of a Jewish national home in Palestine.
- 15 November 1917: Sinai and Palestine campaign: British troops capture Tel Aviv and Jaffa.
- 8–26 December 1917: The British Sinai and Palestine Campaign: Battle of Jerusalem – The Ottomans are defeated by the British forces at the Battle of Jerusalem. The British Army's General Allenby enters Jerusalem on foot, in a reference to the entrance of Caliph Umar in 637.
- 1918: Forces of the Arab Revolt enter Damascus accompanied by British troops, ending 400 years of Ottoman rule.
- 4 April 1918 – The first edition of the Hebrew-language daily newspaper Haaretz is published, sponsored by the British military government in Palestine.
- June 1918 – First meeting between the Zionist leader Chaim Weizmann and the son of the Sharif of Mecca Hashemite Prince Faisal, who led the Arab forces in the Arab Revolt against the Ottoman Empire during the First World War, which takes place in Faisal's headquarters in Aqaba in an attempt to establish favourable relations between Arabs and Jews in the Middle East.
- 14 July 1918 – Sinai and Palestine campaign: Battle of Abu Tellul
- 19 September – 1 October 1918 – Sinai and Palestine campaign: Battle of Megiddo
- 23 September – Sinai and Palestine campaign: British occupation of Haifa is completed.
- 1 October 1918 – Sinai and Palestine campaign: A combined Arab and British force occupy Damascus.
- 3 October 1918 – Sinai and Palestine campaign: The forces of the Arab revolt led by Prince Faysal enter Damascus. In 1920 Prince Faysal becomes the king of the Arab Kingdom of Syria for a short period.
- October 1918: Sinai and Palestine campaign: The British Sinai and Palestine Campaign officially ends with the signing of the Armistice of Mudros and, shortly thereafter, the Ottoman Empire is dissolved.

=== Notable births ===
1853

- Musa al-Husayni (b. Jerusalem), Palestinian Arab politician (d. 1934).

1856

- Yaakov Meir (b. Jerusalem), Palestinian Jewish rabbi, first Sephardic Chief Rabbi of Mandatory Palestine (d. 1939).

1858

- Yosef Navon (b. Jerusalem), Palestinian Jewish businessman who financed the construction of the Jaffa–Jerusalem railway (d. 1934).

1870

- Yosef Eliyahu Chelouche (b. Jaffa), Palestinian Jewish entrepreneur, businessman, industrialist, and pioneer (d. 1934).

1874

- 2 March – Yeshayahu Press (b. Jerusalem), Palestinian Jewish and Israeli researcher (d. 1955).
- Khalil Beidas (b. Nazareth), Palestinian Arab scholar and novelist (d. 1949).

1876

- Pinchas David Horowitz (b. Jerusalem), Palestinian Jewish-born American Hasidic rabbi (d. 1941).
- Akiva Librecht (b. Jerusalem), Palestinian Jewish and Israeli Zionist activist and pioneer (d. 1958).

1880

- 23 May – Ben-Zion Meir Hai Uziel (b. Jerusalem), Palestinian Jewish and Israeli rabbi, Sephardi Chief Rabbi of Mandatory Palestine and Israel (d. 1953).
- 18 August – Ya'akov Moshe Toledano (b. Tiberias), Palestinian Jewish and Israeli rabbi, and Israeli cabinet minister (d. 1960).

1881

- Raghib al-Nashashibi (b. Jerusalem), Palestinian Arab landowner and public figure (d. 1951).

1882

- 31 July – Itamar Ben-Avi (b. Jerusalem), Palestinian-Jewish activist for Zionist causes, son of Eliezer Ben-Yehuda and first native speaker of Modern Hebrew (d. 1943).
- 19 November – Izz ad-Din al-Qassam (b. Jableh, Ottoman Syria), Muslim cleric, founder of the militant Black Hand movement in Palestine (d. 1935).
- Kamel al-Budeiri (b. Jerusalem), Palestinian Arab politician and political activist (d. 1923).

1883

- Jamil al-Ulshi (b. Damascus), Syrian Arab politician and acting head of state during the French Mandate era (d. 1951).
- 17 July – Avraham-Haim Shag (b. Jerusalem), Palestinian Jewish and Israeli politician (d. 1958).

1885

- Avraham Elmalih (b. Jerusalem), Palestinian Jewish and Israeli journalist, community leader, Zionist activist and Israeli politician (d. 1967).

1886

- 18 September – Yehuda Burla (b. Jerusalem), Palestinian Jewish and Israeli educator and author (d. 1969).

1887

- 2 August – Gad Frumkin (b. Jerusalem), Palestinian Jewish and Israeli jurist, only Jewish judge on the Supreme Court of Mandatory Palestine (d. 1960).

1888

- Approximately – Yisroel Ber Odesser (b. Tiberias), Palestinian Jewish and Israeli rabbi (d. 1994).
- 4 August – Yitzhaq Shami (b. Hebron), Palestinian Jewish and Israeli writer (d. 1949).
- Alexander Aaronsohn (b. Zikhron Ya'akov), Jewish author and activist in Ottoman and Mandatory Palestine (d. 1948).
- Saleh Suleiman (b. Reineh), Israeli-Arab politician (d. 1980).
- Izzat Darwaza (b. Nablus), Palestinian Arab politician, historian, and educator (d. 1984).

1889

- 11 October – Yosef Yoel Rivlin (b. Jerusalem) Israeli scholar (d. 1971).
- 23 October – Avshalom Feinberg (b. Gedera), Palestinian Jewish spy, member of the Nili spying network during World War I (d. 1917).
- 24 December – Ovadia Hedaya (b. Aleppo), Palestinian Jewish and Israeli rabbi (d. 1969).
- Awni Abd al-Hadi (b. Nablus), Palestinian Arab politician (d. 1970).
- Rushdi al-Shawwa (b. Gaza), Palestinian Arab politician (d. 1965).

1890

- 5 January – Sarah Aaronsohn (b. Zikhron Ya'akov), Palestinian Jewish spy, member of the Nili spying network (d. 1917).
- 3 May – Avraham Chaim Naeh (b. Hebron), Palestinian Jewish and Israeli rabbi and posek (d. 1954).
- Asher Mizrahi (b. Jerusalem), Jewish tenor singer and musician in Tunisia (d. 1967).
- Zaki Alhadif (b. Tiberias), Palestinian Jewish politician, mayor of Tiberias (d. 1937).

1891

- 1 August – Eliyahu Hacarmeli (b. Haifa), Palestinian Jewish and Israeli politician (d. 1952).

1892

- 7 April – Moshe Chelouche (b. Jaffa), Palestinian Jewish and Israeli politician and businessman, mayor of Tel Aviv for ten days (d. 1968).
- 24 September – Tawfiq Canaan (b. Beit Jala), Palestinian Arab physician, medical researcher, and nationalist (d. 1964).
- Aref al-Aref (b. Jerusalem), Palestinian Arab journalist, historian, and politician (d. 1973).

1893

- 13 August – Gad Machnes (b. Petah Tikva), Palestinian Jewish and Israeli politician and businessman (d. 1954).

1894

- 25 April – Esther Raab (b. Petah Tikva), Palestinian Jewish and Israeli author and poet (d. 1981).
- Amram Blau (b. Jerusalem), Palestinian Jewish and Israeli rabbi, noted anti-Zionist activist and co-founder of Neturei Karta (d. 1974).
- Jamal al-Husayni (b. Jerusalem), Palestinian Arab politician (d. 1982).
- Stephan Hanna Stephan (b. Beit Jala), Palestinian Arab writer, translator, and radio broadcaster (d. 1949).

1895

- 20 January – Bechor-Shalom Sheetrit (b. Tiberias), Palestinian Jewish police commander and Israeli cabinet minister (d. 1967).
- 13 October – Menachem Mendel Monsohn (b. Jerusalem), Palestinian Jewish born American rabbi (d. 1953).

1896

- Israel Rokach (b. Jaffa), Palestinian Jewish and Israeli politician, second mayor of Tel Aviv (d. 1959).
- Avshalom Gissin (b. Petah Tikva), Palestinian Jewish Ottoman Army officer and activist in local defense for Zionist pioneers (d. 1921).
- Yitzhak Arieli (b. Jerusalem), Palestinian Jewish and Israeli rabbi (d. 1974).
- Mordechai Weingarten (b. Jerusalem), Jewish community leader in Jerusalem during the 1948 Arab–Israeli War, mukhtar of Jerusalem's Jewish Quarter (d. 1964).
- Mohamed Ali Eltaher (b. Nablus), Palestinian Arab journalist (d. 1974).

1897

- 3 May – Musa Alami (b. Jerusalem), Palestinian Arab politician (d. 1984).
- 7 June – David Tidhar (b. Jaffa), Palestinian Jewish and Israeli police officer, private detective, and author (d. 1970).
- 23 July – Radi Annab (b. Nablus), Palestinian-born Jordanian military officer (d. 1993).
- 20 December – Netanel Hochberg (b. Ness Ziona), Palestinian Jewish and Israeli agronomist (d. 1983).
- Amin al-Husseini (b. Jerusalem), Palestinian Arab nationalist leader Grand Mufti of Jerusalem (d. 1974).

1898

- 24 February – Yaakov Ades (b. Jerusalem), Palestinian Jewish and Israeli rabbi, rosh yeshiva, and dayan (d. 1963).
- Moshe Ben-Ami (b. Tiberias), Israeli politician and lawyer (d. 1960).
- Amin Tarif (b. Julis), Palestinian and Israeli Druze leader (d. 1993).
- 20 October – Yehiel R. Elyachar (b. Jerusalem), Palestinian Jewish-born American engineer, real estate developer, and philanthropist (d. 1989).

1899

- Eliyahu Elyashar (b. Jerusalem), Israeli politician and writer (d. 1981).
- Yaqub al-Ghusayn (b. Ramla), Palestinian Arab politician (d. 1948).

1900

- 16 December – Avraham Kalfon (b. Tiberias), Israeli politician (d. 1983).
- Yusuf Abu Durra (b. Silat al-Harithiya), Palestinian Arab rebel commander (d. 1940).

1902

- 27 January – Yosef Sapir (b. Jaffa), Palestinian Jewish politician and Israeli cabinet minister (d. 1972).
- 2 February – Eliyahu Sasson (b. Damascus), Palestinian Jewish politician and Israeli cabinet minister (d. 1978).

1903

- 22 July – Ami Assaf (b. Rosh Pinna, Upper Galilee), Palestinian Jewish community leader and Israeli politician (d. 1963).
- 2 August – Ezra Danin (b. Jaffa), Israeli politician and Haganah intelligence officer (d. 1984).

1905

- 23 July – Oved Ben-Ami (b. Petah Tikva), Israeli politician and businessman, Zionist settlement activist and first mayor of Netanya (d. 1988).

1906

- Mahmud Al-Nashaf (b. Tayibe), Israeli Arab politician (d. 1979).
- Ahmed A-Dahar (b. Nazareth), Israeli Arab politician (d. 1984).

1907

- 26 February – Zvi Berenson (b. Safed), Israeli jurist, judge on the Supreme Court of Israel and writer of the first draft of the Israeli Declaration of Independence (d. 2001).
- 10 June – Ezra Ichilov (b. Petah Tikva), Palestinian Jewish community leader and Israeli politician (d. 1961).
- Benjamin Shwadran (b. Jerusalem), Israeli historian (d. 2001).
- Reuben Alcalay (b. Jerusalem), Israeli lexicographer (d. 1976).
- Abd al-Qadir al-Husayni (b. Jerusalem), Palestinian Arab nationalist leader (died 1948).

1908

- 16 July – Yizhar Harari (b. Jaffa), Palestinian Jewish activist and Israeli politician (d. 1978).
- Ya'akov Gil (b. Tiberias), Israeli politician and rabbi (d. 1990).

1909

- 25 March – Elyakum Ostashinski (b. Petah Tikva), Israeli politician (d. 1983).
- 27 July – Rachel Tzabari (b. Tel Aviv), Israeli politician (d. 1995).
- 23 October – Avraham Biran (b. Petah Tikva), Israeli Jewish archaeologist (d. 2008).
- 13 December – Amnon Harlap (b. Rehovot), Palestinian Jewish and Israeli footballer (d. 2006).
- 20 December – Reuven Shiloah (b. Jerusalem), Israeli intelligence officer, first director of Mossad (d. 1959).
- Moshe Castel (b. Jerusalem), Israeli painter, volcanic ash artist (d. 1991).

1910

- 13 January – Yehuda Tzadka (b. Jerusalem), Israeli rabbi (d. 1991).
- 15 April – Bracha Zefira (b. Jerusalem), Israeli folk singer, songwriter, musicologist, and actress (d. 1990).
- 20 July – Shlomo Zalman Auerbach (b. Jerusalem), Israeli Haredi rabbi (d. 1995).
- 5 October – Avraham Nudelman (b. Jaffa), Palestinian Jewish and Israeli footballer (d. 1985).
- Shoshana Shababo (b. Zikhron Ya'akov), Israeli writer (d. 1992).
- Sara Levi-Tanai (b. Jerusalem), Israeli choreographer (d. 2005).
- Tarab Abdul Hadi (b. Jenin), Palestinian Arab feminist activist (d. 1976).
- Faras Hamdan (b. Baqa al-Gharbiyye), Israeli-Arab politician (d. 1966).

1911

- 16 January – Mordechai Benshemesh (b. Tel Aviv) Palestinian Jewish born Australian architect (d. 1993).
- 5 March – Binyamin Kahane (b. Jaffa) Israeli pilot who pioneered prominent aerial tactics (d. 1956).
- 8 November – Yair Sprinzak (b. Tel Aviv) Israeli scientist and politician (d. 1999).
- Diyab Obeid (b. Tayibe), Israeli Arab politician (d. 1984).

1912

- Sholom Schwadron (b. Jerusalem), Israeli Haredi rabbi (d. 1997).
- 29 May – Yehoshua Bar-Yosef (b. Safed), Israeli writer (d. 1992).

1913

- 25 October – Avraham Yoffe (b. Yavne'el), Israeli military officer and politician (d. 1983).
- 12 March – Ya'akov Frank (b. Jerusalem), Israeli politician (d. 1993).
- Aaron Valero (b. Jerusalem), Israeli physician and educator (d. 2000).
- Elias Nakhleh (b. Rameh), Israeli-Arab politician (d. 1990).

1914

- 23 January – Yehuda Cohen (b. Safed), Israeli Jewish Supreme Court justice (d. 2009).
- 18 March – Shneior Lifson (b. Tel Aviv), Israeli scientist (d. 2001).
- 20 May – Avraham Shapira (b. Jerusalem), Israeli rabbi, Ashkenazi chief rabbi of Israel (d. 2007).
- 24 October – Dov Yermiya (b. Beit Gan), Israeli military officer and political activist (d. 2016).
- 14 November – Shmuel Tankus (b. Jaffa), Israeli military officer, fifth commander of the Israeli Navy (d. 2012).
- 8 December – Ruth Amiran (b. Yavne'el), Israeli archaeologist (d. 2005).

1915

- 4 January – Benjamin Elazari Volcani (b. Ben Shemen), Israeli-American biologist (d. 1999).
- 20 May – Moshe Dayan (b. Kibbutz Degania Alef, Lower Galilee), Israeli Jewish military officer and cabinet minister (d. 1981).
- 23 June – Oded Burla (b. Jerusalem), Israeli writer, poet, and artist (d. 2009).
- 10 December – Eliezer Waldenberg (b. Jerusalem), Israeli Haredi rabbi and dayan (d. 2006).

1916

- 2 April – Menachem Porush (b. Jerusalem), Israeli ultra-Orthodox Jewish politician (d. 2010).
- 27 September – S. Yizhar (b. Rehovot), Israeli Jewish author (d. 2006).
- Zahara Schatz (b. Jerusalem), Israeli Jewish painter and sculptor (d. 1999).
- Binyamin Shahor (b. Jerusalem), Israeli Jewish politician (d. 1979).

1917

- 6 March – Ruth Dayan (b. Haifa), Israeli social activist, founder of the Maskit fashion house, and widow of Moshe Dayan (d. 2021).
- 21 March – Yigael Yadin (b. Jerusalem), Israeli Jewish archeologist, military officer and cabinet minister (d. 1984).
- 17 May – Tony Cliff (b. Zikhron Ya'akov), originally Yigael Gluckstein, Palestinian Jewish born Trotskyist activist in Britain (d. 2000).
- 8 June – David Coren (b. Jerusalem), Israeli Jewish politician (d. 2011).
- 17 July – Yehoshua Zettler (b. Kfar Saba), senior member of Jewish paramilitary group, Lehi, in Mandate Palestine (d. 2009).
- 25 December – Yigal Mossinson (b. Ein Ganim), Israeli novelist, playwright, and inventor (d. 1994).

1918

- 4 January – Yossi Harel (b. Jerusalem), Israeli military intelligence officer and pre-state Haganah member, commander of illegal Jewish immigrants ships including the SS Exodus (d. 2008).
- 30 January – Meir Meivar (b. Safed), Israeli politician and Haganah commander (d. 2000)
- 10 October – Yigal Allon (b. Kfar Tavor, Lower Galilee), Israeli Jewish military officer and cabinet minister (d. 1980).
- 15 October – Yigal Hurvitz (b. Nahlat Yehuda), Israeli politician (d. 1994).

1919

- 19 April – Haneh Hadad (b. Jish), Israeli-Arab politician and police officer (d. 2020).
- 8 May – Aharon Remez (b. Tel Aviv), Israeli politician and diplomat, and commander of the Israeli Air Force (d. 1994).
- 10 June – Haidar Abdel-Shafi (b. Gaza), Palestinian political leader (d. 2007).
- 1 July – Nissim Eliad (b. Tiberias), Israeli politician (d. 2014).
- 5 August – Menachem Ratzon (b. Petah Tikva), Israeli politician (d. 1987).
- Full date unknown – Hanna Ben Dov (b. Jerusalem), Israeli painter (d. 2008).
- Full date unknown – Ya'akov Mizrahi (b. Rehovot), Israeli politician (died 1979).
- Full date unknown – Binyamin Gibli (b. Petah Tikva), Israeli military intelligence officer (d. 2008).
