= Party letter =

Letter for a political party in elections

A party letter (Danish: partibogstav) is the letter used to represent parties or lists in elections in Denmark, the Faroe Islands and Iceland. The system is also used in Israel. Party letters emerged in Denmark in the beginning of the 1900s. The letters do not necessarily correspond to the abbreviation of the individual party. In Denmark, Parties are ordered alphabetically on the ballot in order of the party letter.

== Danish party letters ==
The current Danish party letters date back to the 1909 Copenhagen municipal election. There, the parties were assigned letters alphabetically according to their size on the council. Other party letters have been assigned based on the choices of the party. From the 1937 municipal election onwards, a uniform set of party letters have been used. Since 1943, these letters have also been used for parliamentary elections.

In Denmark, party letters are assigned by the Interior Ministry to all parties with ballot access, and each party is limited to one letter only. The letter S is reserved for Schleswig Party, while the letter X cannot be assigned due to the conflation with the X mark made on the ballot. In practice, the letters L and T are reserved for local lists, while the letter W is normally not assigned due to the conflation with the letter V (used by Venstre).

The following is a list of party letters that have been used in Danish parliamentary elections or European Parliament elections from 1943 onwards.

Letter	Parties	
Letter	Current	Historical
A	Social Democrats (1943–)	—N/a
B	Social Liberals (1943–)	—N/a
C	Conservative People's Party (1943–)	—N/a
D	—N/a	Venstre (1943–1968); Centre Democrats (1989–2005); New Right (2016–2022)
E	—N/a	Justice Party (1943–1990); Klaus Riskær Pedersen (2019)
F	Socialist People's Party (1958–)	Farmers' Party (1943–1945)
G	—N/a	The Greens (1987–2001)
H	Citizens' Party (2025–)	Humanist Party (1988–1990)
I	Liberal Alliance (2008–) (Note: The party was originally known as New Alliance; it changed its name to Liberal Alliance in 2008.)	Socialist Workers Party (1981–1988)
J	—N/a	June Movement (1994–2009)
K	—N/a	Communist Party of Denmark (1943–1988); Christian Democrats (2004–2022) (Note: The party was originally known as Christian People's Party; it changed its name to Christian Democrats in 2003.)
L	—N/a	Liberal Centre (1966–1968); Marxist–Leninist Party (1984–1988)
M	Moderates (2022–)	Peace Politics People's Party (1964); Centre Democrats (1973–1989)
N	—N/a	National Socialist Workers' Party of Denmark (1943); People's Movement against the EU (1979–2019)
O	Danish People's Party (1995–)	—N/a
P	—N/a	Pensioners' Party (1977); Common Course (1987–1997); Stram Kurs (2019)
Q	—N/a	Christian People's Party (1971–2004); Independent Greens (2021–2022)
R	—N/a	Danish Unity (1943–1964); Communist Workers Party (1979–1981)
S	Schleswig Party (1943–)	—N/a
T	—N/a	—N/a
U	—N/a	Independent Party (1953–1968); Democratic Renewal (1998)
V	Venstre (1968–)	Venstre of the Capital (1947–1950) (Note: Venstre ran as a separate party in the capital constituencies, in order to take advantage of the electoral law at the time. De facto, this party was part of the main Venstre party, with the elected MPs joining Venstre's parliamentary group.)
W	—N/a	—N/a
X	—N/a	—N/a
Y	—N/a	Left Socialists (1968–1988); New Alliance (2007–2008)
Z	—N/a	Progress Party (1973–2001)
Æ	Denmark Democrats (2022–)	—N/a
Ø	Red–Green Alliance (1989–)	—N/a
Å	The Alternative (2015–)	—N/a

== Israel party letters ==
In Israel, party letters are assigned, separately for each election, by the Central Elections Committee, and a party can have multiple letters. However, parties represented in the outgoing Knesset have the right to reuse their letters from the last elections; new parties cannot use an existing party's letters without its consent, and are limited to two letters only. While historically, most parties in Israel used one letter, the trend is towards two and three-letter codes, as a legacy of party mergers. For example, the Likud's party letters, מחל, represent the parties which historically made it up: מ for La'am, ח for Herut, and ל for the Liberal Party. The right to use multiple letters also means that parties sometimes choose letters with a particular meaning, such as Yesh Atid's פה ("Here": when combined with the party's name, this makes up the slogan "There is a future here") or Ale Yarok's קנ (First two letters of קנביס "Cannabis": Ale Yarok was a single-issue party revolving around cannabis legalization).

Traditional letter combinations
Letters	Historical owner	Debut	Component	Historical Owner	Debut	Component #2	Historical Owner	Debut
מחל	Likud (Likud–Gesher–Tzomet, Likud Beiteinu)	1973	חל	Gahal	1965	ח	Herut	1949
מחל	Likud (Likud–Gesher–Tzomet, Likud Beiteinu)	1973	חל	Gahal	1965	ל	Israeli Liberal Party	1961
מחל	Likud (Likud–Gesher–Tzomet, Likud Beiteinu)	1973	מ	La'am	—N/a	מצ	National List	1969
אמת	Israeli Labor Party, The Democrats (Alignment, One Israel, Zionist Union, Labor-Gesher, Labor-Gesher-Meretz)	1969	את	Alignment	1965	א	Mapai	1931
אמת	Israeli Labor Party, The Democrats (Alignment, One Israel, Zionist Union, Labor-Gesher, Labor-Gesher-Meretz)	1969	את	Alignment	1965	ות	Ahdut HaAvoda	1955
אמת	Israeli Labor Party, The Democrats (Alignment, One Israel, Zionist Union, Labor-Gesher, Labor-Gesher-Meretz)	1969	מ	Left Bloc, Mapam	1944			
מרצ	Meretz (Democratic Union)	1992	מ	Left Bloc, Mapam	1944			
מרצ	Meretz (Democratic Union)	1992	רצ	Movement for Civil Rights and Peace	1973			
טב	National Union–Mafdal (The Jewish Home, Union of Right-Wing Parties, Yamina)	2006	ט	Moledet, National Union–Tkuma (National Union, Religious Zionist Party, RZP–Zehut)	1988			
טב	National Union–Mafdal (The Jewish Home, Union of Right-Wing Parties, Yamina)	2006	ב	Mizrachi, National Religious Party, The Jewish Home, Yamina, Bennett 2026 (United Religious Front, National Religious Front, Together)	1944			
גד	Religious Torah Front	1955	ג	Agudat Yisrael (United Torah Judaism)	1951			
גד	Religious Torah Front	1955	ד	Poalei Agudat Yisrael	1951			
