= Jovanice Twinobusingye =

Ugandan politician and legislator

Hon. Jovanice Twinobusingye
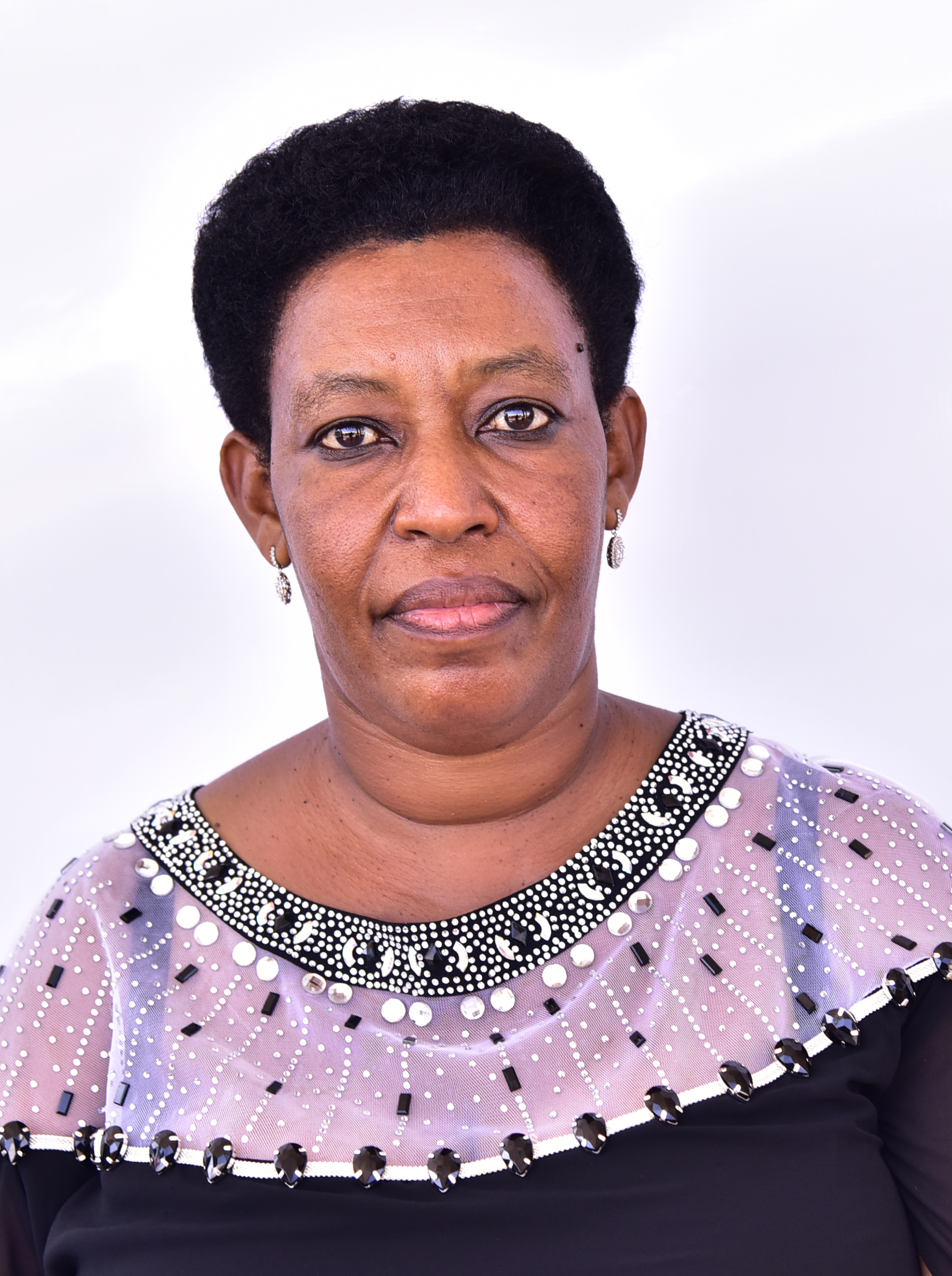
- Born: Uganda
- Citizenship: Ugandan
- Occupation: Politician
- Years active: 2021–present
- Employer: Parliament of Uganda
- Known for: Woman Member of Parliament for Kiruhura District
- Title: Woman Member of Parliament for Kiruhura District
- Political party: National Resistance Movement (NRM)

Jovanice Twinobusingye is a Ugandan politician, legislator and woman representative member of parliament for Kiruhura District in the eleventh Parliament of Uganda. She is a member of the National Resistance Movement (NRM). She sits on the Parliamentary Committee on Public Service and Local Government which is chaired by Hon. Onzima Godfrey.

== Political career ==
Twinobusingye was defeated by Mary Begumisa in the race for the NRM party ticket for Sembabule Woman member of parliament seat. She won the NRM primaries defeating Nuweahereza Phionah and Mwiine Sheillah to become the NRM flag bearer in the 2021 national elections. Twinobusingye won the 2021 national elections to become the woman representative member of parliament for Kiruhura District in the eleventh Parliament of Uganda.

Twinobusingye was part of Rabecca Kadaga's core when she launched her bid for the third term in office during her re-election campaign at Speke Resort, Munyonyo in Kampala.

== Other works ==
Twinobusingye was among the members of parliament of Uganda who decried the poor state of roads in her constituency while legislators debated on the motion urging the government to bolster efforts geared at promoting road safety that was moved by motion moved by Alex Ruhunda, during the commemoration of the National Road Safety Week. She attributed having bad road to the low budgets of the Ministry of Works and Transport.

== Controversy ==
Twinobusingye rejected 2020 NRM primaries election results when she was defeated by Mary Begumisa in the race for the NRM party ticket for Sembabule Woman member of parliament seat. Joy Kabasti who also rejected the same results claimed that several sub-county registrars were kidnapped for hours as they were transmitting the declaration forms to the district tally centre arguing that there was no way the results could remain reliable.

Twinobusingye was among the four out of the seven candidates in the National Resistance Movement primaries in Mawogola North and West constituencies, Sembabule District who rejected the use of National Identity Cards in the 2020 NRM primaries as a guideline which was issued by Tanga Odoi where by all voters had to present their National Identification cards before they could be allowed to vote for their candidate. Odoi noted that the commission intended to set clear identifications for legitimate voters for purposes of eliminating non-residents who could have sneaked or stealthily brought in the area to manipulate the process and he noted that the use of IDs would also prevent multiple voting by people from the other constituencies. Twinobusingye gave two reasons for her rejection, one was that many voters had either lost the cards or registered but they had not yet to picked them from the National Identification and Registration Authority- NIRA. The second reason was that many voters in the area were duped by some contestants to forfeit their cards as security after they had obtained bribes.

== See also ==
1. Rabecca Kadaga
2. Flora Natumanya
3. Sembabule District
