= 1920 Assembly of Representatives election =

- 19 April–3 May 1920
- 314 seats in the Assembly of Representatives
Party	Leader	Seats
Ahdut HaAvoda	David Ben-Gurion	70
Histadrut HaSephardim	Avraham Elmalih	54
Haredi Party	Yosef Chaim Sonnenfeld	53
Hapoel Hatzair	Aaron David Gordon	41
Hitahdut HaIkarim	Alexander Aaronsohn	16
Advanced	Benzion Musinson	13
Yemenite Association	Saadia Kobashi	12
Mizrachi	Yehuda Leib Maimon	9
Unnamed Group		7
Independents		7
Craftsmen's Center	Menachem Sheinkin	6
Bukharan Jews		5
Clerk's Union		5
Women's Union	Sara Tahun	5
Youth of Israel Union		4
Citizen's Union	Meir Dizengoff	3
Mizrahi Youth Union	Dov Natan Brinker	3
Georgian Jews		1
Maccabi		1
This lists parties that won seats. See the complete results below.
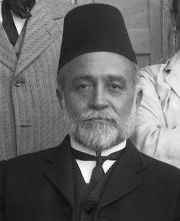
President of the Jewish National Council after
David Yellin; Independent

The first elections to the Assembly of Representatives in Mandatory Palestine were held amongst members of the Jewish community on 19 April 1920, except in Jerusalem where voting took place on 3 May. Ahdut HaAvoda led by David Ben-Gurion emerged as the largest party, winning 70 of the 314 seats.

== Background ==
Following the British conquest of Ottoman Palestine in 1917, Jewish leaders met in Petah Tikva on 17 November to discuss the formation of a representative convention. After Jerusalem fell to the British, another convention was held, this time in Jaffa, to discuss the establishment of an organisation for the Jews of Palestine. A committee was formed with the mandate to hold elections to a Constituent Assembly.

With northern Palestine still held by the Ottomans, a second convention was held in Jaffa in July 1918 and elections were scheduled to be held by the end of 1918. However, after the armistice was signed in November, delegates were required to represent Palestinian Jews at the peace conference. A third convention was held in Jaffa on 18 December, to which every settlement, community and political party were invited. Chaim Weizmann and Nahum Sokolow were chosen to represent the community at the peace conference.

The elections were then postponed several times, before they were fixed for 26 October 1919. However, they were postponed again as Weizmann was worried that internal divisions would weaken the Jewish negotiating position. The date was finally set for 19 April 1920 after it was confirmed that the British would have the Mandate for Palestine.

== Electoral system ==
At the first meeting in Jaffa, it was decided that the election would be held using secret balloting, and would be direct. However, no agreement was made on women's suffrage. The second meeting confirmed that men and women over the age of 21 would be entitled to vote, although the issue of women candidates remained unresolved. The issue was raised at the third Jaffa convention, and despite opposition from Orthodox Jews, it was decided that women would be allowed to stand as candidates. However, ultimately the Orthodox held separate elections in Jerusalem on 3 May, from which women were banned from participating.

Voters elected one member for every 80 voters, except for the Orthodox, who elected one for every 40 voters on the basis that women were banned from their vote. A total of 263 delegates were elected in the general voting, and another 51 by Orthodox voters.

== Results ==
Around 22,000 of the 26,000 registered voters participated in the election.

Party	Seats
Ahdut HaAvoda	70
Histadrut HaSephardim	54
Haredi Party	53
Hapoel Hatzair	41
Histadrut HaIkarim	16
Advanced Party	13
Yemenite Association	12
Mizrachi	9
Unnamed Group	7
Craftsmen's Centre	6
Women's Union	5
Bukharan Jews	5
Clerk's Union	5
Youth of Israel Union	4
Citizen's Union	3
Mizrahi Youth Union	2
Georgian Jews	1
Maccabi Union	1
Independents	7
Total	314

== Aftermath ==
The Assembly met for the first time on 7 October 1920, and voted to admit the 51 Orthodox representatives. It also elected the Jewish National Council to serve as an executive committee.
