= Left Bloc (disambiguation) =

The Left Bloc is a political party in Portugal.

Left Bloc may also refer to:

- Left Bloc (Hungary), a political alliance in the Second Hungarian Republic
- Left Bloc (Luxembourg), a former political alliance in Luxembourg (1908–1912)
- Left Bloc (Mandatory Palestine), a political organisation in Mandatory Palestine
- Left Bloc (Russia), a political alliance in Russia
