= Citizen's Union =

Political party in pre-State Israel (1918–1921)

Citizen's Union הסתדרות האזרח
- Leader: Meir Dizengoff; Bezalel Yaffe
- Founded: 1918
- Dissolved: 1921
- Merged into: General Zionists; Hatzohar
- Headquarters: Tel Aviv, Mandatory Palestine
- Ideology: Zionism; Liberalism
- Political position: Center-right
- Most Seats: 3 (1920)

The Citizen's Union was a political association that was active within the Yishuv in Mandatory Palestine from 1918 to 1921. The association was formed in an attempt to forge a coalition between Middle class residents of the Yishuv, professionals, self-employed individuals and employer in the face of the organizing of the General Histadrut in the Land of Israel.

The Citizen's Union primary principles were "freedom of enterprise, democracy and devotion to the national idea" of forming a national home for the Jewish people in the Land of Israel.

The party was founded in Tel Aviv by Mayor Meir Dizengoff and Bezalel Yaffe, and in the elections for the first Assembly of Representatives in 1920, the party won three seats.

The party did not survive long after the election. Some of its members joined the Revisionists of Ze'ev Jabotinsky, while others preferred to join forces with other liberal groups in forming what would later become the General Zionists.

The party is one of the ancestors of the Likud.

== Assembly of Representatives election ==
Election	Leader	Votes	%	Place	Seats won	+/−
1920	Meir Dizengoff	n/a	n/a	16th	3 / 314	new
