= Sephardim and Oriental Communities =

Sephardim and Oriental Communities ספרדים ועדות מזרח
- Leader: Bechor-Shalom Sheetrit (until 1951); Eliyahu Eliashar (1951)
- Dissolved: 10 September 1951
- Merged into: General Zionists
- Ideology: Sephardic and Mizrahi interests
- Political position: Center
- Most MKs: 4 (1949–1951)
- Fewest MKs: 2 (1951)

Election symbol
- ס, סצ

Sephardim and Oriental Communities (Hebrew: סְפָרַדִּים וְעֵדוֹת מִזְרָח, Sfaradim VeEdot Mizrah) was a political party in Israel and is one of the ancestors of the Likud party.

== History ==
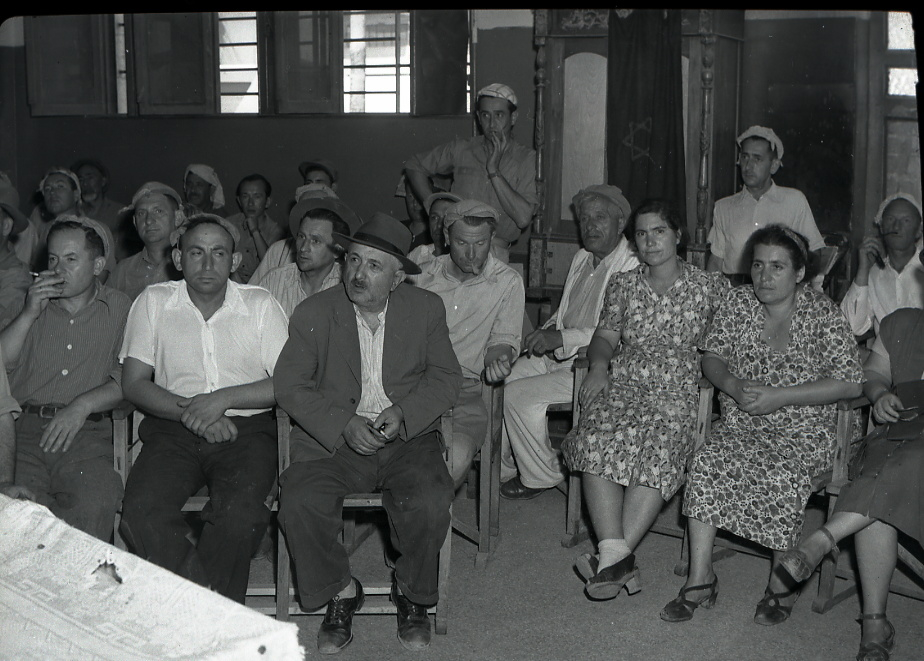
Sephardim and Oriental Communities party convention in 1949

The Sephardim and Oriental Communities party represented Sephardi Jews and Mizrahi Jews who were already living in Israel at the time of independence, and was part of Minhelet HaAm and the Provisional government in 1948–49.

Under the full title of The National Unity List of Sephardim and Oriental Communities, the party gained 3.5% of the vote and four seats in the elections for the first Knesset in 1949. Represented by Moshe Ben-Ami, Eliyahu Eliashar, Avraham Elmalih and Bechor-Shalom Sheetrit, they joined the government as a coalition partner of David Ben-Gurion's Mapai party, with Sheetrit appointed Minister of Police.

For the 1951 election, the party changed its name to The list of Sephardim and Oriental Communities, Old Timers and Immigrants. However, they lost around half their share of the vote (1.8%) and half their seats, slumping to just two representatives. Only Eliashar retained his seat, with Binyamin Sasson taking the second. This time they did not join the government.

On 10 September 1951 the party merged into the General Zionists, then the second-largest party in the Knesset and briefly a member of the governing coalition that made up the fourth and fifth governments (though they were expelled from the sixth after abstaining from a motion of no-confidence).

Some party members were not happy about joining the General Zionists and broke away to reform the party. They contested the 1955 elections with Eliashar as leader, but failed to win a seat.

Later on, the General Zionists merged with the Progressive Party to form the Liberal Party, which was briefly the third-largest party in Israel before merging again with Herut to form Gahal, which eventually became Likud.

== Election results ==
| Election | Leader | Votes | % | Seats | Status | Notes |
|---|---|---|---|---|---|---|
| 1920 | Avraham Elmalih | | | 54 / 314 | | As Histadrut HaSephardim |
| 1925 | | | | 19 / 221 | | As HaSephardim |
| 1931 | Bechor-Shalom Sheetrit | 2,301 | 4.65 (#5) | 6 / 71 | | As Sephardic Bloc |
| 1944 | Did not contest | | | | | Boycotted |
| 1949 | Bechor-Shalom Sheetrit | 15,287 | 3.52 (#7) | 4 / 120 | Government | |
| 1951 | Eliyahu Eliashar | 12,002 | 1.75 (#10) | 2 / 120 | Opposition | |
| 1955 | Eliyahu Eliashar | 6,994 | 0.82 (#13) | 0 / 120 | Extra-parliamentary | |
