= Mary Begumisa =

Ugandan politician

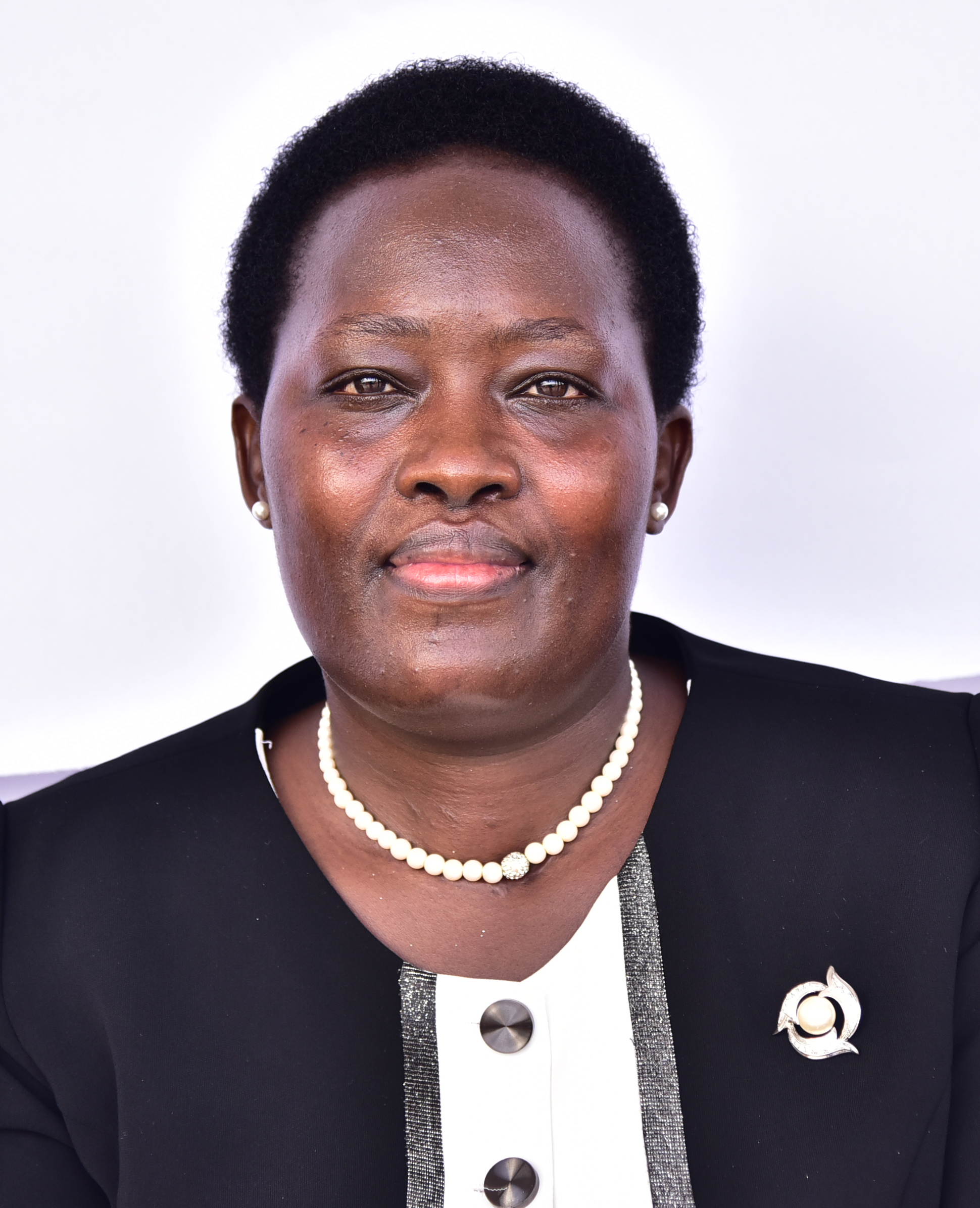
- Born: Rakai district 1976 (age 49–50)
- Citizenship: Ugandan
- Education: Makerere University, Bachelor's degree in Social Sciences
- Occupation: Politician
- Organization(s): Gorilla Trek Africa Adventure Safaris, Mary Begumisa Foundation
- Spouse: Wilbur Begumisa

Mary Begumisa (born in 1976) is a Ugandan politician and woman member of parliament. She attained office after being elected as a woman representative for Sembabule district during the 2021 Uganda general elections in January.

She is a member of the ruling National Resistance Movement political party.

== Education ==
Mary completed her primary level education (PLE) at Lwebitakuli Primary School and completed her Uganda Certificate of Education (UCE) for lower secondary education at Bukulula Secondary School in Masaka. a school where she later completed her advanced secondary level known as Uganda Advanced Certificate of Education (UACE). Begumisa graduated from Makerere University with a bachelor's degree in social sciences.

== Career ==
Mary's career began taking shape in 2000, after she was appointed a sub-county chief in Rakai district. After graduating from Makerere University in 2003, she resigned and chose to venture into the Tour and Travel Business with her husband, Wilbur Begumisa, and they later established Gorilla Trek Africa Adventure Safaris

== See also ==
- Member of Parliament.
- Parliament of Uganda.
- Sembabule District
- National Resistance Movement
- List of members of the eleventh Parliament of Uganda
