= Haim Boger =

Israeli politician (1876–1963)

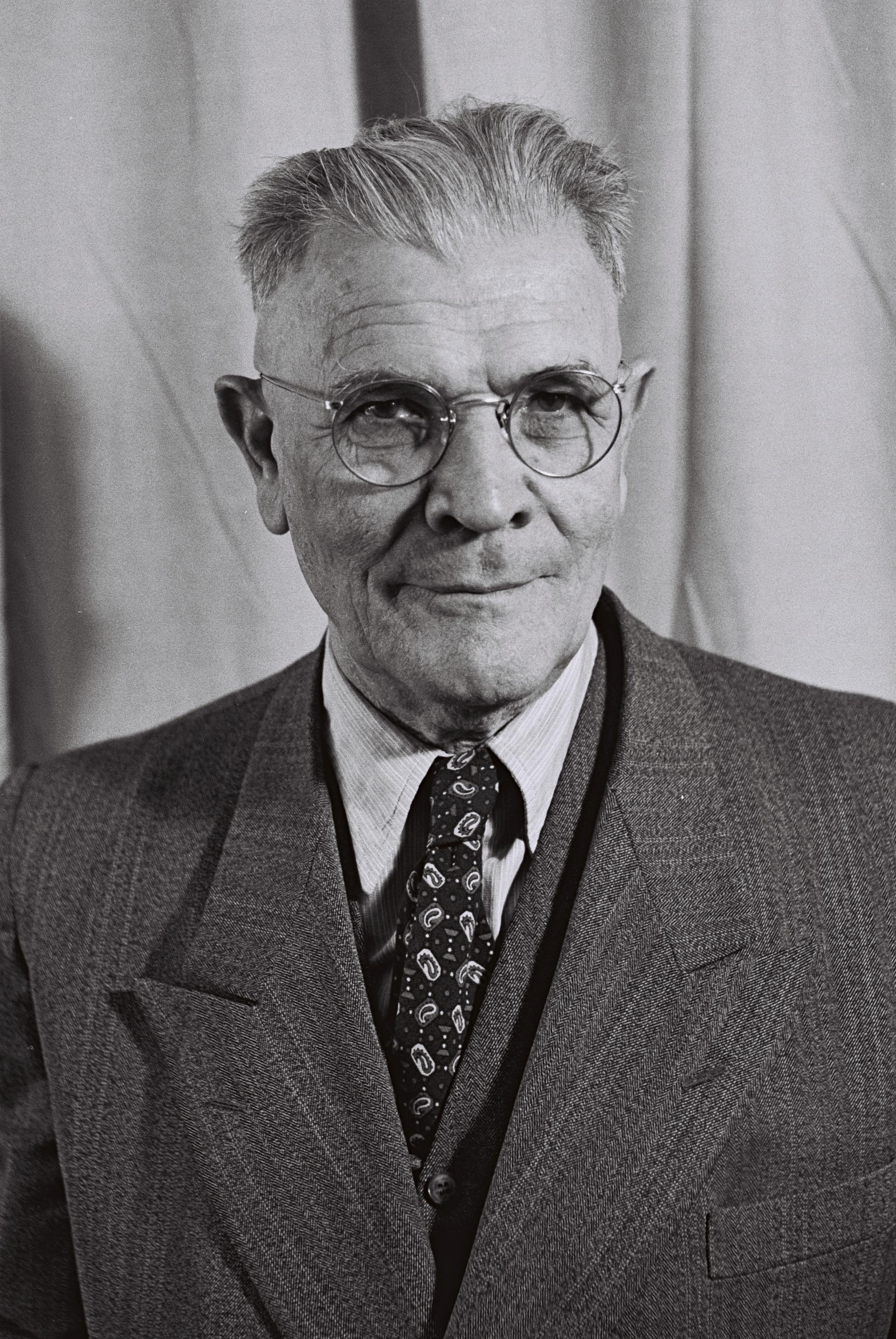
- Boger in 1951

Faction represented in the Knesset
- 1951–1955: General Zionists

Personal details
- Born: 25 September 1876 Chernihivka, Russian Empire
- Died: 8 June 1963 (aged 86) Tel Aviv, Israel

Haim Boger (Hebrew: חיים בוגר; 25 September 1876 – 8 June 1963) was an Israeli politician who served as a member of the Knesset for the General Zionists between 1951 and 1955.

== Biography ==
Born Haim Bograshov in Taurida Governorate in the Russian Empire (today in Ukraine), Boger received traditional education in a yeshiva, and took a correspondence course at a secular gymnasium. He later earned a PhD at the University of Bern. He worked as a teacher in Hebrew schools in Russia.

He was amongst the leaders of the Zionists for Zion organisation, which opposed the British Uganda Programme, a plan to give part of East Africa for a Jewish homeland. He attended several Zionist Congresses, and in 1906 he emigrated to Ottoman-controlled Palestine. He helped establish the Herzliya Hebrew High School, where he was one of the first teachers and later principal, working at the school from 1919 until 1951.

After World War I he established the Nordia neighbourhood in Tel Aviv for homeless people. From 1921 until 1930 he was a member of the Assembly of Representatives and Tel Aviv City Council.

One of the leaders of HaGush HaMizrachi, he was a member of The Union of General Zionists' directorate. He was elected to the Knesset on the General Zionists list in 1951, but lost his seat in the 1955 elections. He died in 1963.

== Legacy ==
Bograshov Street in Tel Aviv is named after Haim Bograshov, and so is Bograshov Beach at the end of the street.
