= Advanced Party =

Advanced Party מפלגת המתקדמים
- Leader: Benzion Musinson; Haim Boger; Eliyahu Berligne; David Yellin
- Founded: 1920
- Dissolved: 1922
- Merged into: General Zionists
- Headquarters: Tel Aviv, Israel
- Ideology: Liberal Zionism; Classical liberalism Economic liberalism
- Political position: Centre
- Most Seats: 13 (1920)

Election symbol
- ז

The Advanced Party (Hebrew: מפלגת המתקדמים, romanized: Mifleget HaMitkadmim), otherwise known as the Advanced Association (Hebrew: התאחדות המתקדמים, romanized: Hitahdut HaMitkadmim) was a liberal and centrist Zionist political association in Mandatory Palestine founded by several urban liberal Zionists. The party was founded in order to represent the voice of Tel Aviv liberals and Zionists in the election to the Yishuv's Assembly of Representatives in 1920. The party placed sixth in the election, coming in behind their rural General Zionist counterrpart, Hitahdut HaIkarim. The party represents first formal General Zionist political party to be founded, and as one of the earliest political ancestors of the modern-day Likud.

== History ==
Under the British Mandate, the Yishuv (Jewish community), established a network of political and administrative institutions, among them the Assembly of Representatives. To ensure that small groups were properly represented, a system of proportional representation was introduced.

Like, the Labor Zionists, liberals in Mandatory Palestine found themselves divided in the run-up to the 1920 election. General Zionists among the Mandate's rural population coalesced into "Hitahdut HaIkarim", or Villages' Association. Concurrently, some urban, Tel Aviv-based liberals of the Yishuv organized themselves into the "Advanced Association" under the leadership of Benzion Musinson, Haim Boger and Eliyahu Berligne. Others rallied around Tel Aviv Mayor, Meir Dizengoff, who founded "Histadrut HaEzrah" or "The Citizen's Association".

The Advanced Party was colored by General Zionist philosophies, advocating for the "immediate establishment of a national home" for the Jewish people in the Land of Israel. The Party likewise advocated for the establishment of the Jewish state through "mutual understanding" and peaceful cooperation between the new state and its Arab neighbors.

Due to the divisions in the liberal camp, the Advanced Party placed in sixth placed in the election, coming behind Hitahdut HaIkarim, with 13 out of 314 seats. Meanwhile, Dizengoff's Citizen's Association suffered most from the General Zionist disunity, winning only three seats in the election. In the two years following the election, the urban General Zionists, including Dizengoff's Citizen's Association and the Advanced Party, bridged the gabs between themselves and merged into the General Zionists Association, the organization from which the later Israeli political party emerged.

== Assembly of Representatives election ==
Election	Leader	Votes	%	Place	Seats won	+/−
1920	Benzion Musinson; Haim Boger; Eliyahu Berligne	n/a	n/a	6th	13 / 314	new
