= Binyamin Sasson =

Israeli politician

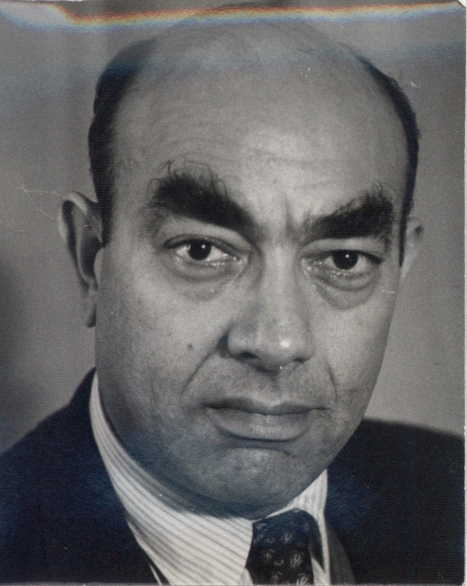
- Sasson in the 1950s

Faction represented in the Knesset
- 1951: Sephardim & Oriental Communities
- 1951–1955: General Zionists

Personal details
- Born: 1903 Baghdad, Ottoman Empire
- Died: 1 May 1989 (aged 85–86) Israel

Binyamin Sasson (Hebrew: בנימין ששון; 1903 – 1 May 1989) was an Israeli politician who served as a member of the Knesset from 1951 to 1955.

== Biography ==
Born Saleh Silas in Baghdad during the Ottoman era, Sasson emigrated to Mandatory Palestine in 1937. He became one of the leaders of Sephardic Jews in Palestine and served as deputy chairman of the Committee of Sephardi Jewry. He was also a member of the board of the World Federation of Sephardi Communities and president of the Iraqi community in Tel Aviv. He was one of the founders of the Israeli branch of Rotary and served as president of the Tel Aviv branch between 1945 and 1946.

A municipal judge, he was placed fifth on the Sephardim and Oriental Communities list for the 1949 Constituent Assembly elections, but the party won only four seats. However, he was placed second on the list for the 1951 Knesset elections, and was elected as the party won two seats. Six weeks after the elections the party merged into the General Zionists. He was placed seventeenth on the General Zionists list for the 1955 elections, but the party won only 13 seats. He died in 1989.
