= Flora Natumanya =

Ugandan politician

Hon. Flora Natumanya
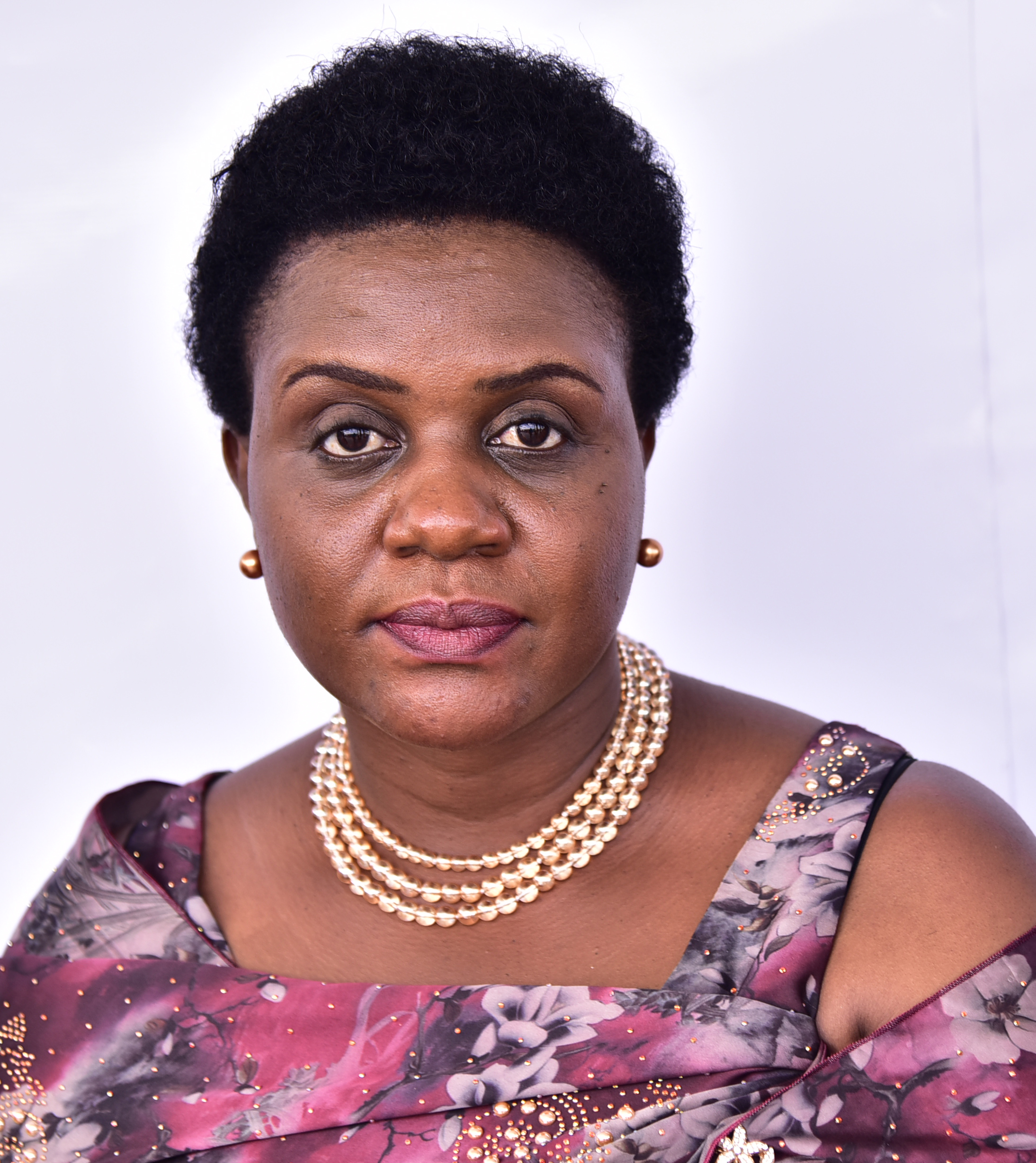

Woman Member of Parliament for Kikuube District
- Incumbent
- Assumed office 2021
- Constituency: Kikuube District

Personal details
- Born: Uganda
- Citizenship: Uganda
- Party: National Resistance Movement
- Occupation: Politician, legislator

Flora Natumanya is a Ugandan politician, legislator and women's representative for Kikuube District in the eleventh Parliament of Uganda. She is a member of National Resistance Movement (NRM).

== Political career ==
Natumanya defeated Tophas Kahwa in the NRM primaries to become the NRM flag bearer in the 2021 National election, the election she won to become the women's representative for Kikuube District in the eleventh Parliament of Uganda. She sits on the parliamentary Committee on Environment and Natural Resources in the eleventh Parliament of Uganda. Natumanya inquired about what the Ugandan government would do to reduce the rate at which sand deposits were being exploited in the Committee on Environment and Natural Resources sessions.

== Other works ==
Natumanya donated five salon vehicles to the people to act as medical service vans in Kikuube District. She also told the people of Kikuube District that the vehicles will be fuelled by her and also that she will be the one to pay the drivers of those vehicles.

== See also ==
- Annet Nnamara
- Anita Among
- Thomas Tayebwa
- Asiimwe Florence Akiiki
