= Yosef Navon =

Jerusalem businessman (1858–1934)

- יוסף נבון
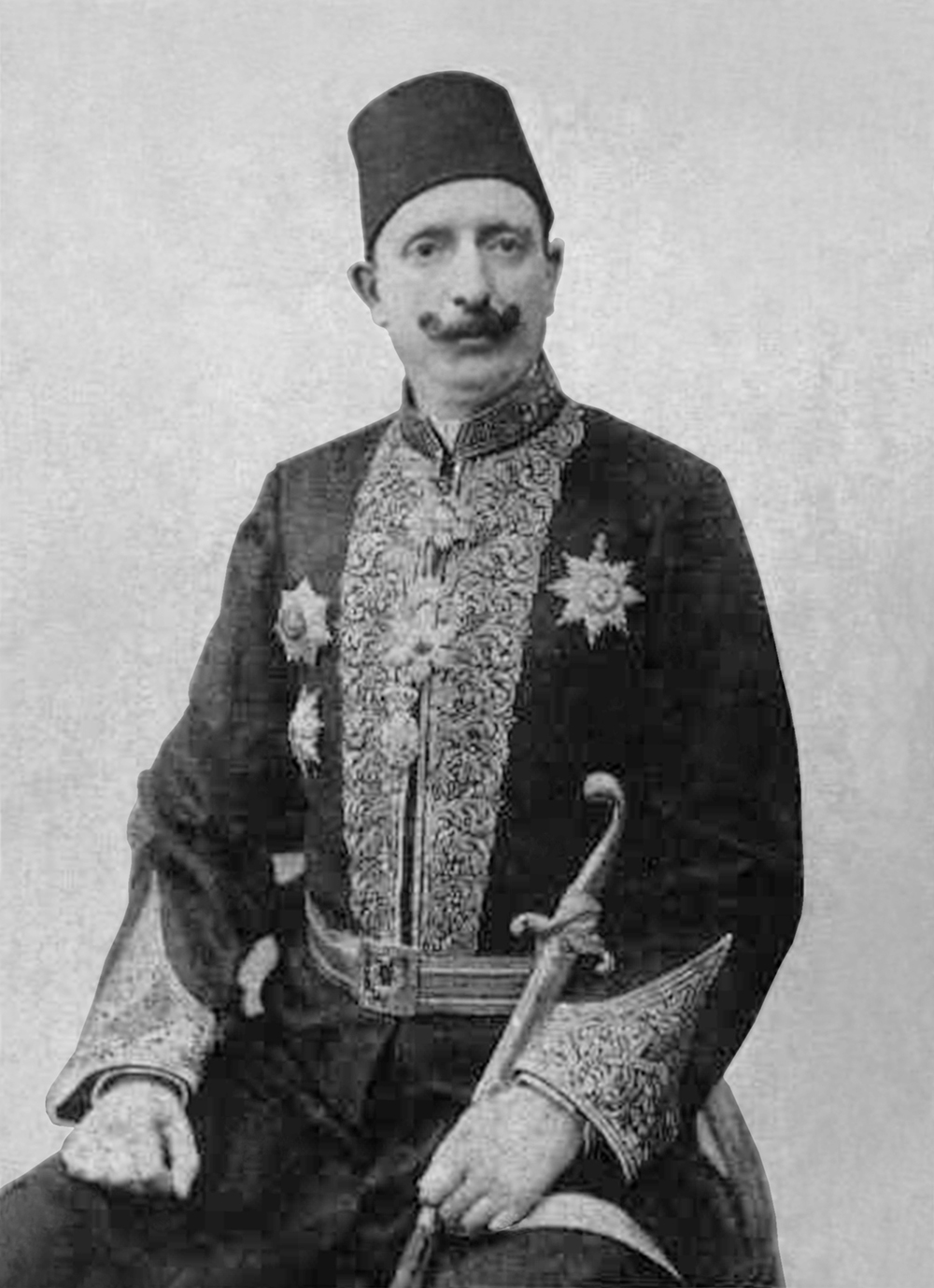
- Yosef Navon
- Born: 1858; Jerusalem, Ottoman Empire
- Died: 1934 (aged 75–76); France
- Occupation: Businessman
- Known for: Construction of the Jaffa–Jerusalem railway
- Spouse: Guishe Frumkin
- Children: 3 daughters
- Parents: Eliyahu Pinchas Navon (father); [Amzallag family member] (mother)
- Relatives: Eliyahu Elyashar (grandson); Yehuda Navon (grandfather)
- Awards: Légion d'honneur; Medjidie; Title of Bey

Yosef Navon (Hebrew: יוסף נבון; 1858–1934) was a Jerusalem businessman and the man principally responsible for the construction of the Jaffa–Jerusalem railway. For his effort, Navon was awarded the Légion d'honneur from the French government, and the Medjidie from the Turkish government, where he was also promoted to the title of Bey.

== Biography ==
Navon was born in Jerusalem to a Sephardic Jewish family which was part of Jerusalem's wealthy Sephardic elite. His father, rabbi Eliyahu Pinchas Navon, was selected by the Ottomans to represent the Yishuv Jews at the Porte, and his mother came from the Amzallag family, also of the Sephardic elite in the Yishuv. His paternal grandfather was Yehuda Navon, a Rishon LeZion. He was educated in a Jerusalem yeshiva and finished his education at a school in Marseille.

Navon married Guishe Frumkin, who had been born in the Russian Empire and moved to the Yishuv with her family as a child. She was the sister of Israel Dov Frumkin. This marriage, which was between an Ashkenazi and a Sephardi Jew, was a unique occurrence in the Old Yishuv. The couple had three daughters. One of his grandchildren was Israeli politician Eliyahu Elyashar.

== Jaffa–Jerusalem railway ==
Navon focused on the railway and began to investigate the possibility of constructing it in 1885. His advantage over earlier proposers of a railway was that he was an Ottoman subject and had connection with the upper class in the empire. He spent three years in Constantinople to promote the project and obtain a firman (permit) from the Ottoman Empire. On October 28, 1888, he received a 71-year concession from the Ottoman authorities that also gave him permission to extend the line to Gaza and Nablus. Lacking the capital to proceed, Navon went to Europe in 1889 to find a buyer for the concession. Camille Collas, a lighthouse inspector, bought it for a million francs. On December 29, 1889, the Societe du Chemin de Fer Ottoman de Jaffa a Jerusalem et Prolongement was founded in Paris with Collas as the first director

For his service of French interests in the project, Navon received the Légion d'honneur from the French government. In 1893, he was awarded the Medjidie by the Ottomans, and later received the title of Bey.

== Other projects ==
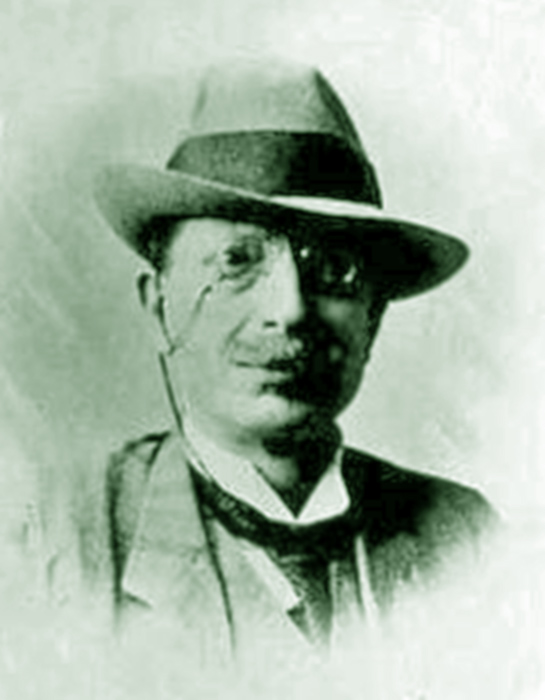
Navon in 1910

Navon joined the bank of Johannes Frutiger from Switzerland, and promoted several important projects in Ottoman Palestine. In 1878, Navon and his uncle, Haim Amzallag, helped purchase the ground for the construction of Petah Tikva, as well as Rishon LeZion in 1882. They also built homes for new immigrants from Yemen and the poor in Jerusalem, creating demand in the lands which the bank owned. Together with Frutiger and Shalom Konstrum, Navon helped found the neighborhood of Mahane Yehuda in 1887 with 162 houses. The neighborhood was named after Navon's brother Yehuda.

By the time Navon accumulated sufficient personal wealth, he had a number of projects in mind: a new port in Palestine, electricity and water supply projects in Jerusalem, and a railway to the city.

After the railway construction was completed, Navon set out to pursue some of the other projects, for which he had already acquired permits. However, the profits from the railway were not sufficient to finance these, and in 1894 Navon set out to Paris, likely to look for investors. He never returned to Jerusalem, and after a 1901 meeting with Theodor Herzl about development in the Yishuv, which the latter was not impressed with, Navon stopped his activity in the region. He spent the remainder of his days living off his title of "Bey" at the Ritz Hotel in Paris. He died in France in 1934 under the care of his Niece in Law (Jewess socialite "The Charleston Queen of Paris", business owner, and WW2 French resistance leader Odette Nissim) and Nephew (Art Dealer Emmanuel Navon).

== Biographies ==
- "The Biography in Historical-Geographical Research - Navon Bey: A Case Study," in The Land that became Israel: studies in historical geography, Ruth Kark, Yale University Press, 1989, pp. 77–89.
- Glass, Joseph B. "Joseph Navon Bey (1858-1934): A Local Entrepreneur and His Contribution to the Changing Landscape of Eretz Yisrael in the Late 19th Century", thesis, Hebrew University of Jerusalem, 1988.
