= Eliyahu Elyashar =

Israeli politician and writer

- אליהו אלישר
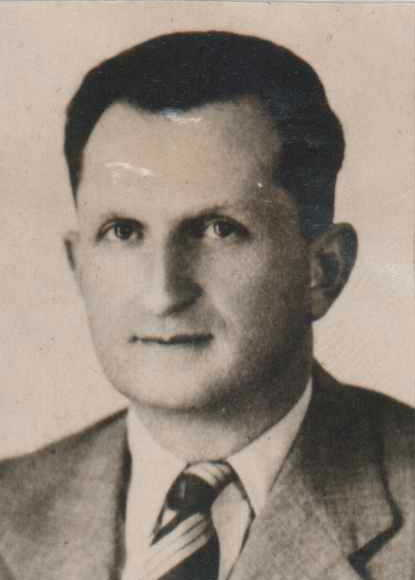

Faction represented in the Knesset
- 1949–1951: Sephardim & Oriental Communities
- 1951–1955: General Zionists

Personal details
- Born: 10 October 1899 Jerusalem, Ottoman Empire
- Died: 30 October 1981 (aged 82)

Eliyahu Elyashar (Hebrew: אליהו אלישר; 10 October 1899 - 30 October 1981) was an Israeli politician and writer.

== Biography ==
Elyashar was born in Jerusalem at a time when it was part of the Ottoman Empire. His father, Yitzhak Shemaya Elyashar, was the grandson of rabbi Yaakov Shaul Elyashar through his father and rabbi Raphael Meir Panigel through his mother. Elyashar's mother Rosa was the daughter of Yosef Navon and his wife Guishe Frumkin, the sister of Israel Dov Frumkin. He had several siblings, including a younger brother, Menashe Elyashar, who became a businessman and public figure.

Elyashar studied medicine at the University of Beirut, as well as law in Cairo and Jerusalem. During World War I he served as a junior medical officer in the Ottoman Army.

After the British took control of Palestine, he started working for the Mandate government in 1922, eventually managing the Trade Bureau in the Department of Customs and Trade. In 1935, he left the civil service and went into business.

In 1938, he became a member of the Sephardi Community Committee in Jerusalem, and also served as a member of its presidium. In 1942, he was elected its president. In the same year he started publishing and editing the weekly newspaper Hed HaMizrah, which he continued to do until 1952.

A member of the Jewish National Council, he was amongst the leadership of the Haganah in Jerusalem and served as a member of the Defence Committee of the Provisional State Council after Israeli independence. In the first Knesset elections in 1949 he was placed second on the Sephardim and Oriental Communities list, and became a Knesset member when the party won four seats. He headed the party for the 1951 elections, in which it won two seats. Shortly after the elections the party merged into the General Zionists.

Prior to the 1955 elections Elyashar was amongst the party members who broke away to reform Sephardim and Oriental Communities. He again headed its list for the elections, but it received only 0.8% of the vote, failing to cross the 1% electoral threshold, resulting in Eliashar losing his seat.

In 1974, Elyashar was one of the founders of the Israeli Council for Israeli-Palestinian Peace.

Elyashar later published two books; Living with the Palestinians in 1975, and Living with the Jews in 1981. He died in October that year.
