= Moshe Ben-Ami =

Israeli politician (1898–1960)

- משה בן-עמי
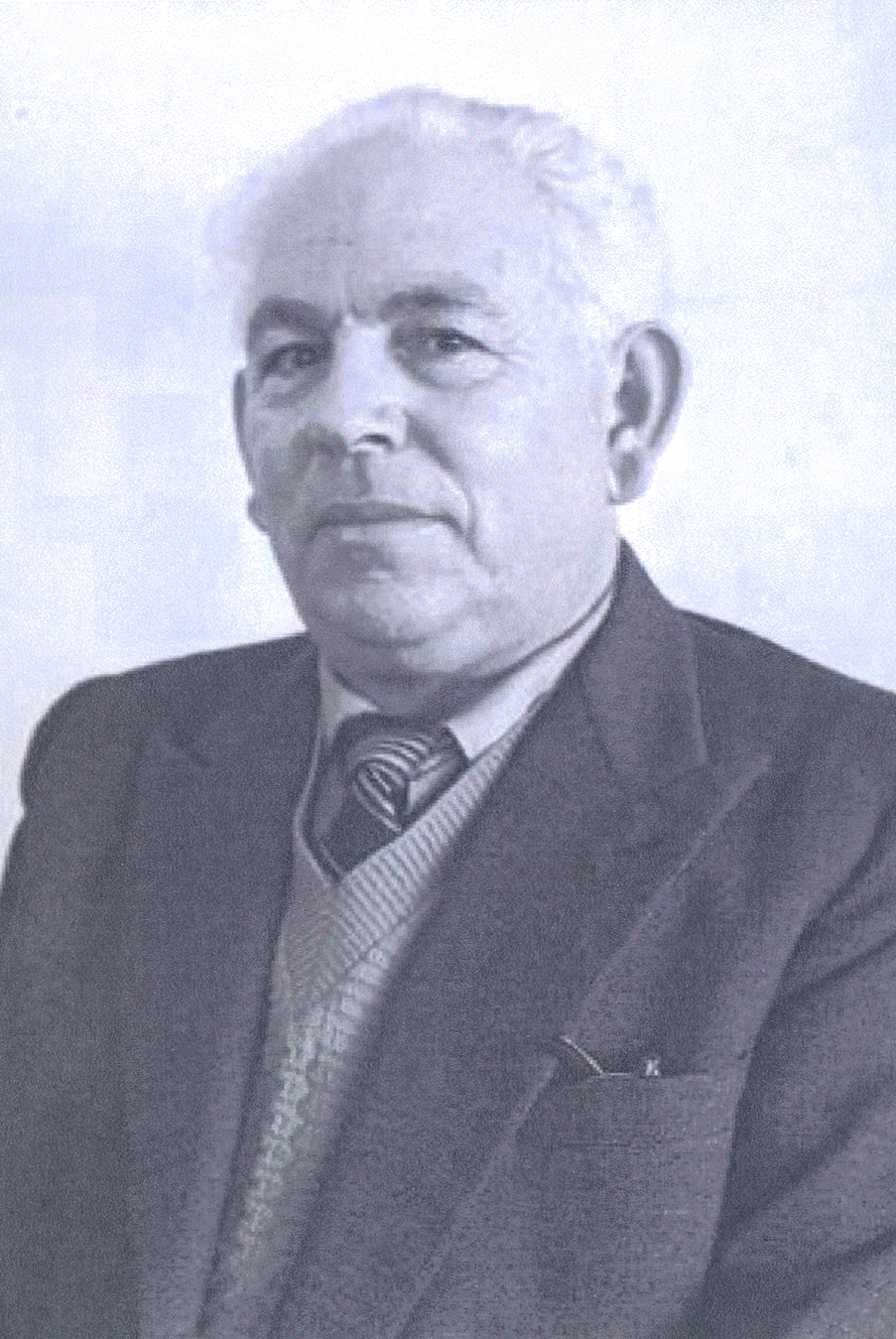
- Ben-Ami during his time in the Knesset

Faction represented in the Knesset
- 1949–1951: Sephardim & Oriental Communities

Personal details
- Born: 1898 Tiberias, Ottoman Empire
- Died: 18 February 1960 (aged 61–62)

Moshe Ben-Ami (Hebrew: משה בן-עמי; 1898 – 18 February 1960) was an Israeli politician and lawyer.

== Biography ==
Born in Tiberias at a time when it was part of the Ottoman Empire, Ben-Ami studied at a local yeshiva and at the Lipshitz Teachers' Seminary in Jerusalem. He also studied law at the Jerusalem School of Jurisprudence and was certified as a lawyer.

He became chairman of the Jewish neighbourhoods of Jaffa in 1943, serving for three years. He also chaired the Social Services Department of Tel Aviv city council, and was deputy chairman of the Sephardi Committee in the city.

In the first Knesset elections in 1949, he won a seat on the Sephardim and Oriental Communities list and served as a member of the Constitution, Law and Justice Committee, the House Committee and the Finance Committee. He lost his seat in the 1951 elections.
