= 1944 Assembly of Representatives election =

- 2 August 1944
- 173 seats in the Assembly of Representatives
Party	Leader	Vote %	Seats
Mapai	David Ben-Gurion	36.85	64
Left Bloc (HH–PZ)	Meir Ya'ari	12.39	21
New Aliyah	Pinchas Rosen	10.72	19
Hapoel HaMizrachi	Haim-Moshe Shapira	9.45	16
Ahdut HaAvoda	Yitzhak Tabenkin	9.04	16
Mizrachi	Yehuda Leib Maimon	3.28	7
Yemenite Association	Saadia Kobashi	2.53	4
Democratic Centre	Israel Rokach	2.37	4
WIZO	Rachel Cohen-Kagan	2.17	4
PCP	Shmuel Mikunis	1.90	3
Maccabi		1.87	3
HaOved HaTzioni		1.86	3
Independent Religious List		1.57	2
Merchants		0.84	2
PMFJS		0.71	1
Mizrachi Women		0.61	1
Yemenite Workers		0.48	1
Oriental Religious Group		0.27	1
Religious Women Workers		0.02	1
This lists parties that won seats. See the complete results below.
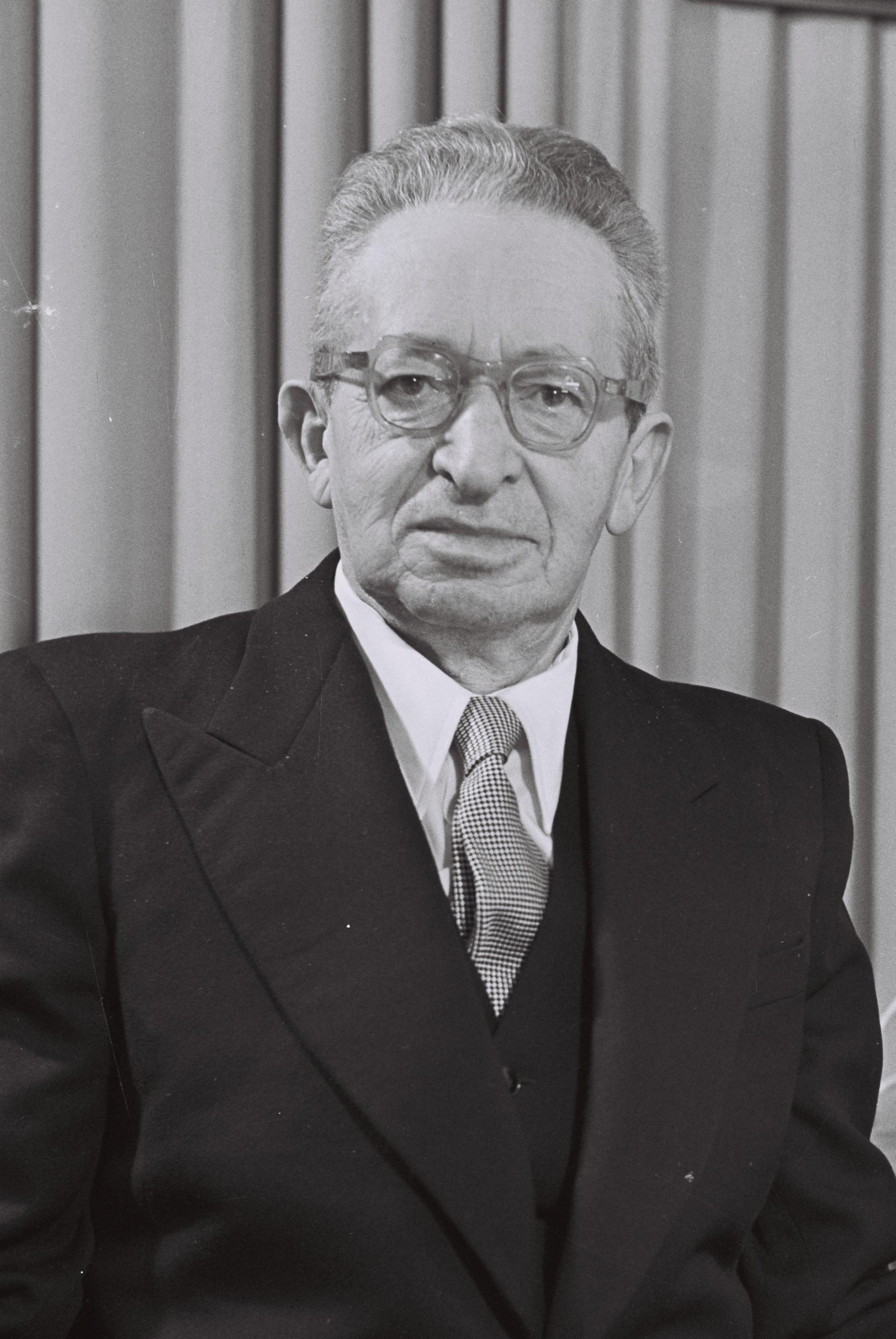

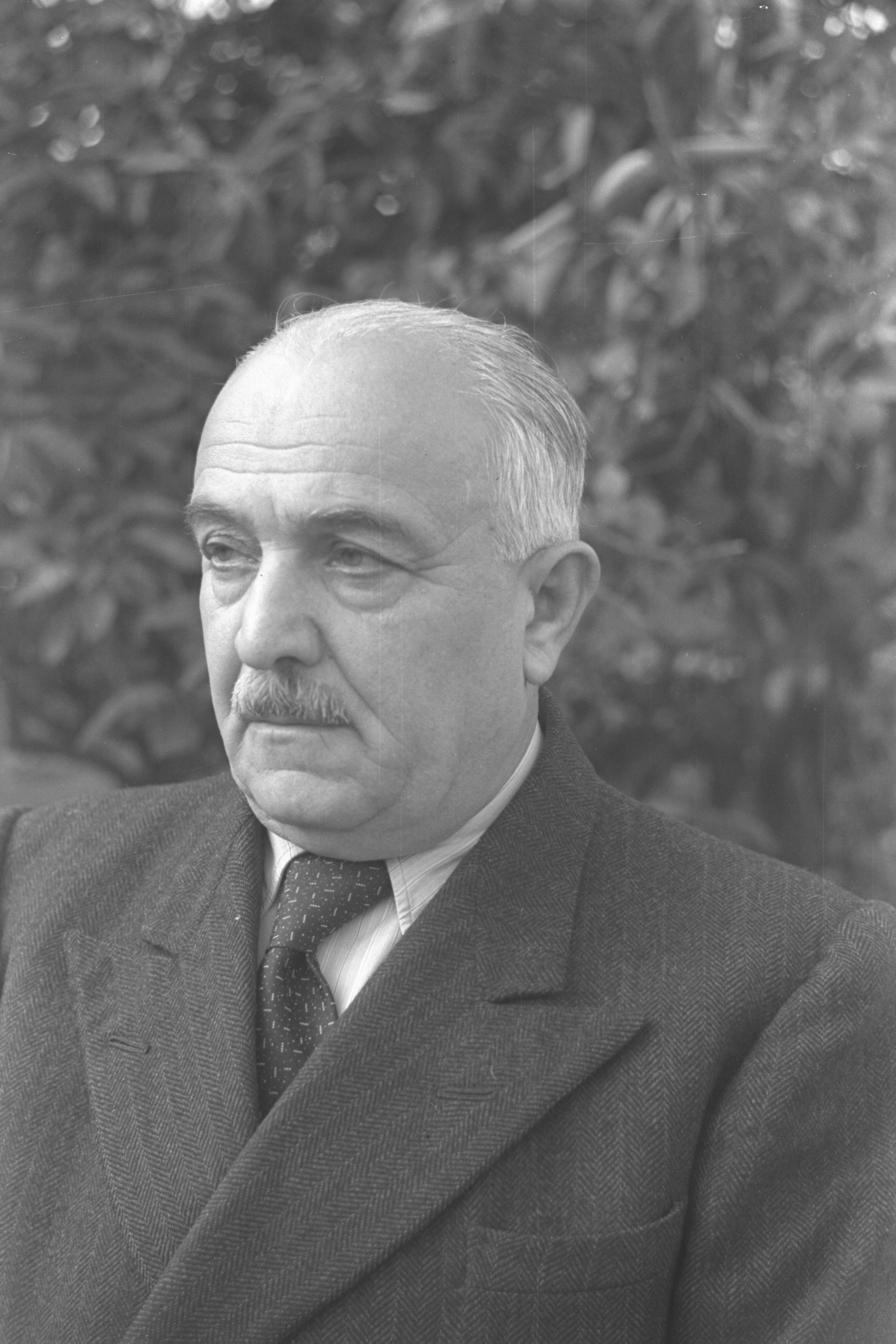
President of the Jewish National Council before	President of the Jewish National Council after
Yitzhak Ben-Zvi; Mapai	David Remez; Mapai

Elections to the Assembly of Representatives of Mandatory Palestine were held on 2 August 1944. Just over 200,000 Jewish residents voted, more than 70% of all those eligible to vote. This compared with just over 50,000 who voted at the previous elections in 1931. The difference reflected the high level of Jewish immigration to Palestine in the 1930s and 1940s.

== Campaign ==
A total of 24 parties contested the elections, nominating 1,694 candidates. However, the Revisionist-Zionist Hatzohar party, Sephardic Bloc, the General Zionist Group “B” and the Jewish Farmers Association boycotted the elections.

== Results ==
Party	Votes	%	Seats
Mapai	73,122	36.85	64
Left Bloc (Hashomer Hatzair–Poale Zion Left)	24,582	12.39	21
New Aliyah Party	21,279	10.72	19
Hapoel HaMizrachi	18,748	9.45	16
Ahdut HaAvoda	17,928	9.04	16
Mizrachi	6,513	3.28	7
Yemenite Association	5,019	2.53	4
Democratic Centre	4,704	2.37	4
Women's International Zionist Organization	4,314	2.17	4
Palestine Communist Party	3,780	1.90	3
Maccabi	3,718	1.87	3
HaOved HaTzioni	3,685	1.86	3
Independent Religious List	3,118	1.57	2
Merchants	1,673	0.84	2
People's Movement for a Jewish State	1,418	0.71	1
Mizrachi Women	1,217	0.61	1
Yemenite Workers	957	0.48	1
HaOved HaDati	790	0.40	0
Discharged Soldiers and Families	666	0.34	0
Oriental Religious Group	543	0.27	1
Young Men of Aden	264	0.13	0
Bnei HaYishuv	240	0.12	0
National Workers Front	118	0.06	0
Religious Women Workers	30	0.02	1
Total	198,426	100.00	173
Valid votes	198,426	98.78	
Invalid/blank votes	2,455	1.22	
Total votes	200,881	100.00	
Source: Palestine Post

Around 80% of the elected Assembly members supported the Biltmore Declaration, which demanded the creation of a "Jewish Commonwealth" after World War II.
