= Shoshana Shababo =

Israeli writer

Shoshana Shababo שושנה שבבו
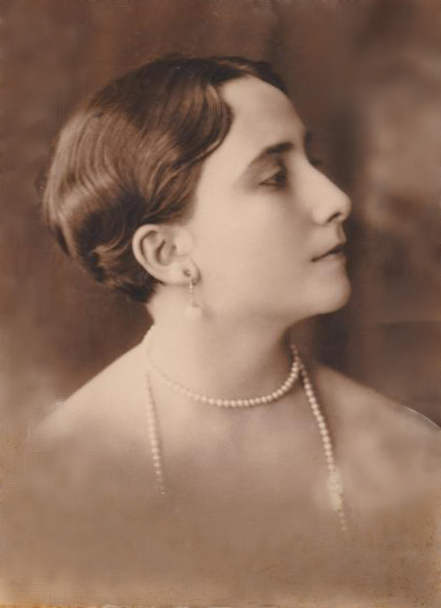
- Born: October 12, 1910 Zikhron Ya'akov
- Died: July 4, 1992 (aged 81) Haifa, Israel

Shoshana Shababo (Hebrew: שושנה שבבו; 1910–1992) was an Israeli writer.

== Biography ==
Shoshana Shababo was born in Zikhron Ya'akov to a Sephardic Jewish family originally from Safed. Her father, Shlomo Shababo, taught Arabic at Al-Azhar University and moved to Zikhron Ya'akov after being invited to teach there.

As a teenager, Shababo attended a local school whose director was the writer Yehuda Burla. She was a gifted student and read a lot of Hebrew and foreign literature. At the age of 15, with the help of a letter of recommendation from Burla, she was accepted to study at the Levinsky College of Education in Tel Aviv. While she was at Levinsky, she began writing short stories and newspaper articles. At 16, she began writing her first book "Maria," which was published in 1932.

After the death of her mother, she moved to Paris and spent time with her brother in London. After her return in 1942, she published her second book, "Ahava be-tsfat" (Love in Safed). That same year at the age of 32, she married David Karsanti. The couple moved to Hadar HaCarmel in Haifa where they opened a wool store. Despite her short stories being successful and popular among readers, the literary establishment heavily criticized her work. This alongside the death of her sister at 22, and her nephew being killed in the 1947–1949 Palestine war led to her distancing herself from writing.

Shababo died on July 4, 1992, in Haifa. She was buried in Zikhron Ya'akov.
