= Menachem Sheinkin =

Zionist leader (1871–1924)

- מנחם שיינקין
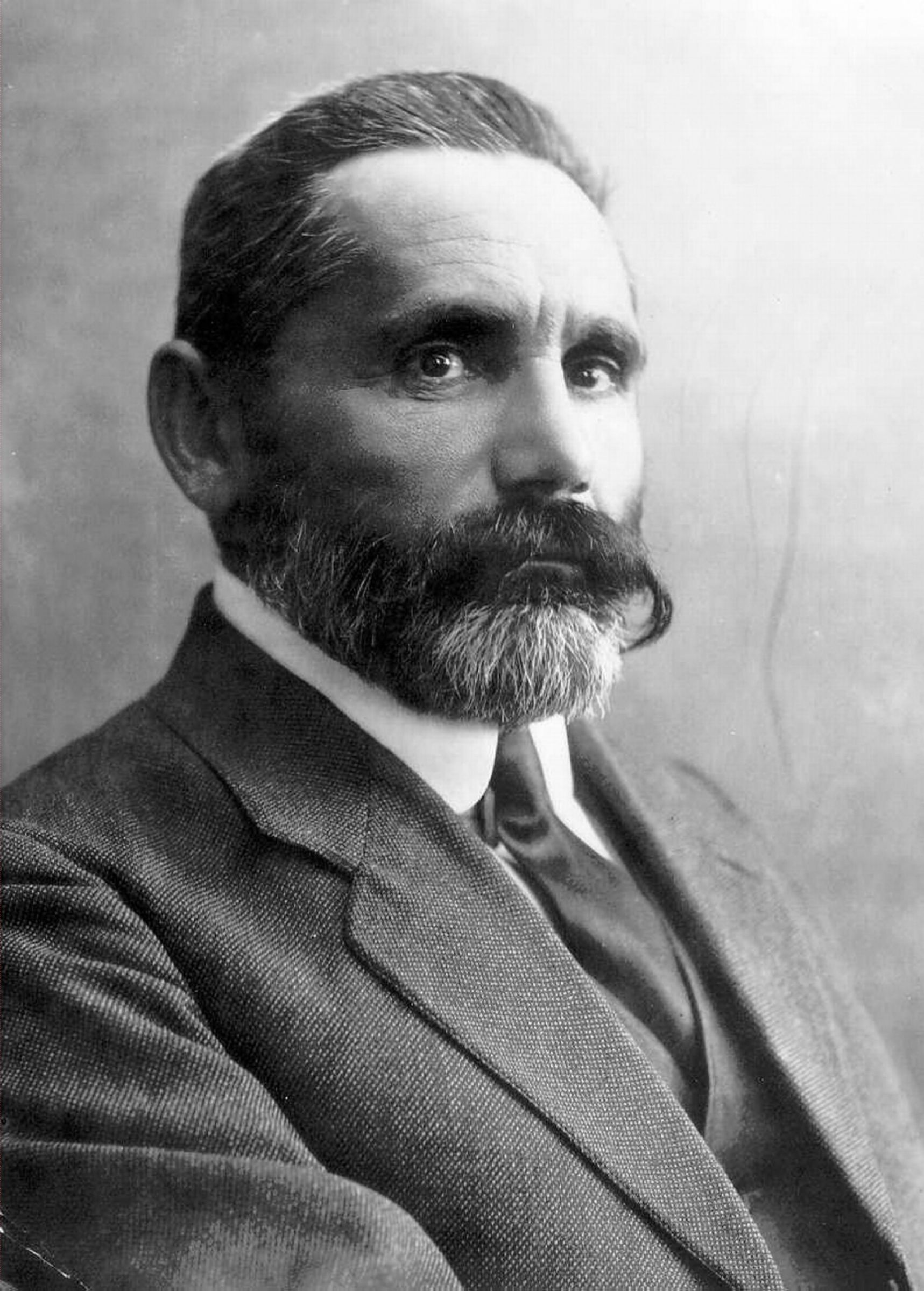
- Menachem Sheinkin
- Born: 1871; Ulla, Vitebsk Governorate, Russian Empire
- Died: 1924 (aged 52–53); Chicago, Illinois, United States
- Burial place: Trumpeldor Cemetery
- Political party: Hohevei Zion; Democratic Fraction
- Movement: Zionism

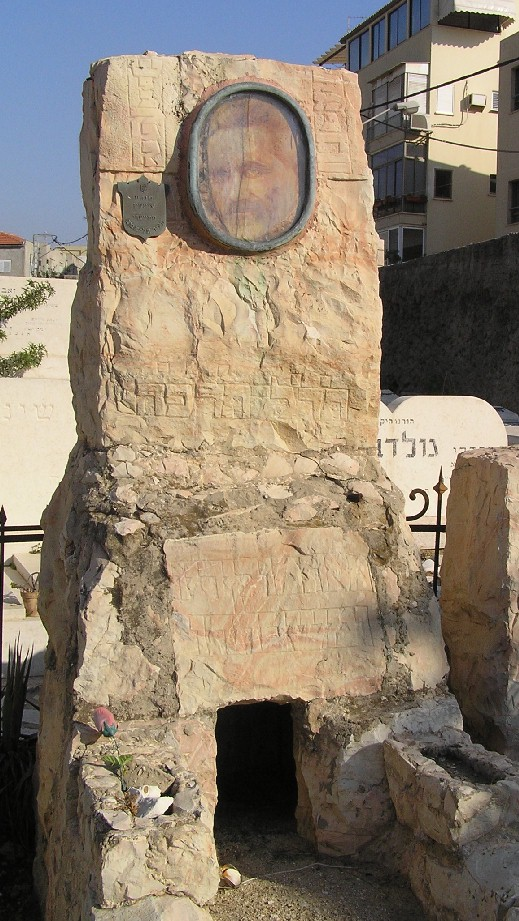
Sheinkin's tomb

Menachem Sheinkin (Hebrew: מנחם שיינקין) (1871 – December 10, 1924) was a Zionist politician and activist. He was one of the founders of Tel Aviv. He was expelled from Ottoman Palestine during World War I but returned in 1919, before dying in a vehicle accident in 1924 in Chicago.

== Early life ==
Menachem Sheinkin was born in 1871 in town of Ulla in what is now the Vitebsk region of Belarus but was then part of the Russian Empire. In 1892 he moved to Odessa where he studied at Odessa University.

== Career ==
He was an early Zionist active in the Hohevei Zion movement, and was a delegate to the Second Zionist Congress in 1898. In 1900 he visited the land of Israel for the first time and after that trip went to London as a delegate to the Fourth Zionist Congress. As a member of the Zionist Congress he would join the Democratic Fraction in opposition to Theodore Herzl and oppose the Uganda Scheme at the 7th Zionist Congress in 1905. In 1901 he became a rabbi in the town of Blata, in 1906 he would lose this position due to his refusal to give up his Zionist activity.

in 1906 he made aliyah to the land of Israel and moved to Jaffa he worked where he directed Hohevei Zion's information and immigration office and was one of the founders of Tel Aviv in 1909, with coming up with the name of Tel Aviv. During World War 1 he was deported from Ottoman Palestine and moved to the United States, while in the US he helped found the American Zion Commonwealth.

He returned to what would shortly become Mandatory Palestine in 1919 and became director of the Zionist Commission's immigration office.

== Death ==
In 1924 Sheinkin was killed in a traffic accident in Chicago while on a Zionist mission to the city. He is buried in Trumpeldor Cemetery in Tel Aviv. Tel Aviv's Sheinkin Street and one of Tel Aviv's suburbs are named after him.

== Works ==
During his life Sheinkin wrote many pamphlets about a variety of topics:

- Informatsyons byuro yafo (Information Bureau, Yafo)
- Di bale-melokhe un di arbeter in der alie fun erets-yisroel (The tradesmen and the laborers in aliya to Israel)
- Kolonizatsyons-meglikhkeyten in erets-yisroel, a kurtser iberblik (Colonization possibilities in the land of Israel, a brief overview)
- Erets yisroel in milkhome-tsayt, fakten fun dem dortigen leben (The land of Israel in wartime, facts from local life
- Di tsien komonṿelth (aḥuzat tsiyon) in der tsienistisher program (The Zion Commonwealth [Aḥuzat Tsiyon] in the Zionist program)
- Der idisher legyon, zayn fargangenheyt, gegenvart un tsuḳunft (The Jewish Legion, its past, present, and future)

He also was contributor to the Yiddish and Hebrew publications: Yidishes tageblat (Jewish daily newspaper), Di varhayt (The truth), Tog (Day), Hatoran (The duty officer), and Haivri (The Jew).
