= Avraham Elmalih =

Israeli politician and journalist (1885–1967)

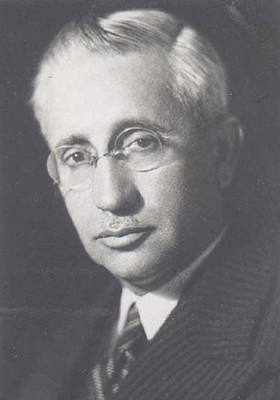

Faction represented in the Knesset
- 1949–1951: Sephardim & Oriental Communities

Personal details
- Born: 1885 Jerusalem, Ottoman Empire
- Died: 2 April 1967 (aged 81–82)

Avraham Elmalih (Note: also spelled Elmaleh) (Hebrew: אברהם אלמליח; 1885 – 2 April 1967) was a journalist, linguist, Zionist activist and Israeli politician.

== Biography ==
Avraham Elmalih was born in Ottoman Jerusalem in 1885 and was raised in the Old Sephardi Yishuv; his father Elijah ben Abraham, a Rabati jurist and halakhic scholar, had migrated to Palestine from Morocco around 1850.

Elmalih received a rabbinic education, initially at Mugrabi Talmud Torah of Rabbi Yehouda Kastil in the Old City of Jerusalem and then at Yeshiva Doresh Tsiyyon and Yeshiva Tiferet Yisrael. He also attended the Alliance Israélite Universelle school in Jerusalem and the École biblique et archéologique française de Jérusalem.

Between 1902 and 1912, he taught at the Alliance school. He studied at the Archaeological Institute and worked as a teacher in his home city, as well as in Istanbul, Jaffa and Damascus. During World War I he was exiled to Damascus.

He published his first essay in Ha-Shkafa (השקפה 'The Viewpoint') in 1903. He edited the Ladino (Judeo-Spanish) newspaper El Liberal (איל ליביראל; 1908). He founded the daily newspaper Ha-Ḥerut (החרות 'The Freedom'; 1909–10) and served as its editor. He was also on the editorial board of Do'ar HaYom (דואר היום 'The Daily Mail') from 1921 to 1932; he also briefly edited its Arabic version: Barīd al-Yawm (بريد اليوم). He edited the monthly scholarly journal Mizraḥ u-Maʿarav (מזרח ומערב 'East and West'; 1919–32).

In 1920 he was elected to the Assembly of Representatives for Histadrut HaSephardim and the following year joined the Jewish National Council. In 1921, the Jewish National Fund sent him as an emissary to North Africa; he then published several essays about the history and ethnography of the Jewish communities of the Maghreb. In 1928 Elmaliah published a book titled The Land of Israel and Syria during WWI. In 1935 he became a member of Jerusalem city council.

Following Israeli independence he was elected to the first Knesset in 1949 on the Sephardim and Oriental Communities. He lost his seat in the 1951 elections.

== Hebrew national consciousness ==
Elmalih was a promoter of Hebrew language acquisition and emphasised the importance of "national creation" and "national literature" when founding the journal Mizrah u-Ma'arav (East and West) in 1919:

East and West will call for national revival among the Jews of the East and will serve those who read and studied the ancient rabbinic literature as a bridge to our modern literature. It will also stimulate among Eastern Jews a love for our language and national treasures. It will particularly aspire to develop among Eastern and North African Jews the ambition to be creative in original Hebrew writings; to become influential within the process of spiritual development and the renewal of education in Jewish communities in the East and West".
