= Assembly of Representatives (Mandatory Palestine) =

Legislature of the Jewish community of the British Mandate

Assembly of Representatives אספת הנבחרים Asefat HaNivharim
- Flag of Zion

Type
- Type: Unicameral

History
- Founded: 19 April 1920
- Disbanded: 13 February 1949
- Succeeded by: Knesset

Elections
- First election: 19 April–3 May 1920
- Last election: 2 August 1944

Meeting place
- Jerusalem

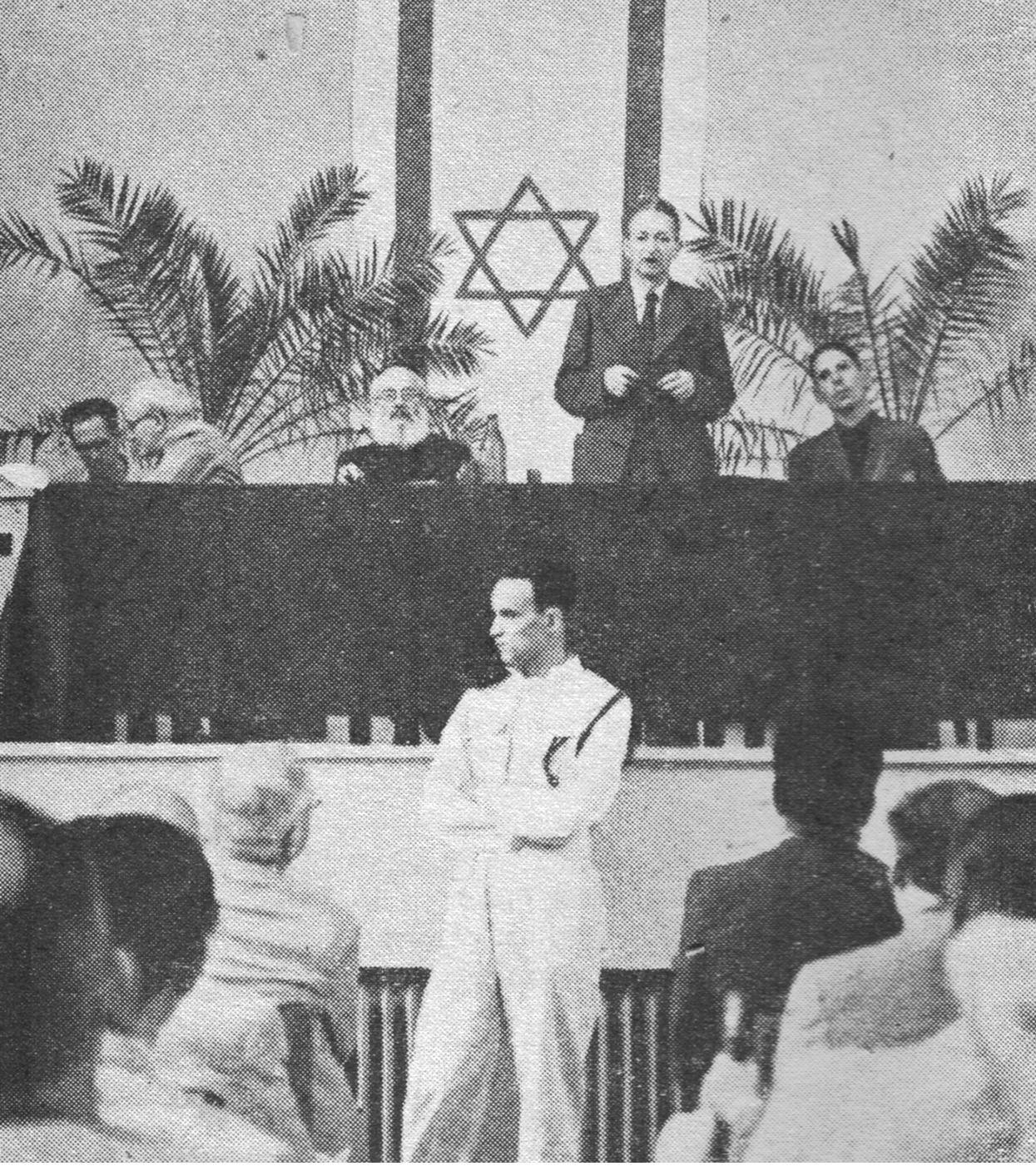
Yitzhak Ben-Zvi at the Assembly of Representatives, September 1944

The Assembly of Representatives (Hebrew: אספת הנבחרים, Asefat HaNivharim) was the elected parliamentary assembly of the Jewish community in Mandatory Palestine. It was established on 19 April 1920, and functioned until 13 February 1949, the day before the first Knesset, elected on 25 January, was sworn in. The Assembly met once a year to elect the executive body, the Jewish National Council, which was responsible for education, local government, welfare, security and defense. It also voted on the budgets proposed by the Jewish National Council and the Rabbinical Council.

== History ==
Under the British Mandate, the Yishuv (Jewish community), established a network of political and administrative institutions, among them the Assembly of Representatives. To ensure that small groups were properly represented, a system of proportional representation was introduced. The first elections were held on 19 April 1920, and the largest faction, Ahdut HaAvoda, won only 70 of the Assembly's 314 seats. The ultra-orthodox community and the ultra-orthodox Agudat Yisrael party boycotted the Assembly elections due to their objections to secular Zionism.

The second elections were held in 1925, and following the passing of the Religious Communities Organisation Ordinance in 1926, the Assembly was recognised by the British authorities in 1928.

Further elections were held in 1931 and 1944. In the latter elections, some groups, especially the Sephardic Jews, boycotted the elections and were not represented. From 1944 onwards the Assembly was also boycotted by Hatzohar due to disagreements with the elected leaders over policy.

== Elections ==
- 19 April 1920
- 6 December 1925
- 5 January 1931
- 2 August 1944
