= Left Bloc (Mandatory Palestine) =

Jewish leftwing organization in Mandatory Palestine

The Left Bloc was a Jewish left-wing organization in Mandatory Palestine, which existed in the late 1920s. The group published a newspaper called Derekh Hapoel (דרך הפועל, Hebrew for 'Workers' Path'). Politically, the organization was critical of the Histadrut leadership for not organizing Arab and Jewish workers jointly. In the 1944 Assembly of Representatives election it ran as a coalition of the Hashomer Hatzair Workers Party and Poale Zion Left. The Left Bloc merged with Ahdut HaAvoda into Mapam in 1948.
