= Yosef Shofman =

Israeli politician and diplomat

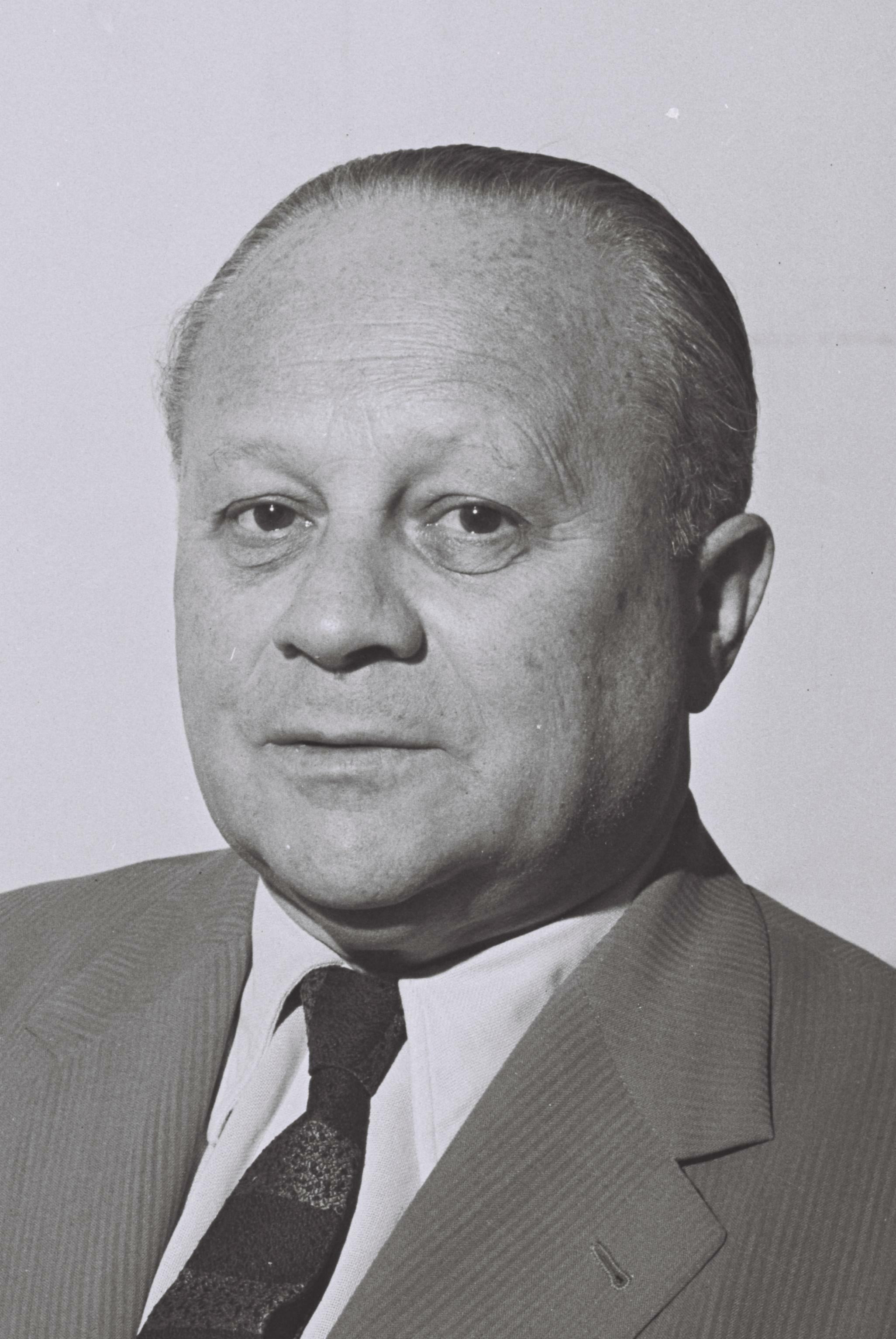
- Shofman in 1959

Faction represented in the Knesset
- 1955–1965: Herut
- 1965–1969: Gahal

Personal details
- Born: 16 June 1903; Warsaw, Russian Empire
- Died: 10 September 1978 (aged 75)

Yosef Shofman (Hebrew: יוסף שופמן; 16 June 1903 – 10 September 1978) was an Israeli politician and diplomat who served as a member of the Knesset for Herut and Gahal between 1955 and 1969, and as the country's ambassador to Venezuela between 1971 and 1974.

== Biography ==
Born in Warsaw in the Russian Empire (today in Poland), Shofman studied law at the University of Warsaw and was certified as a lawyer. He was a member of Hashomer Hatzair during his youth, and in 1923 joined the Yardenia Zionist student movement. Between 1925 and 1926 he worked as director of the Jewish National Fund's newspaper bureau in Poland, and from 1926 until 1927 worked as a journalist for a Polish language newspaper in Paris.

He joined Hatzohar, and in 1930 was elected to its national central committee. In 1937 he became chairman of the Polish branch of the New Zionist Organization (Nowa Organizacja Syjonistyczna) The other leaders were Jan Bader and Ya'acov Cohen.

In 1940 he made aliyah to Mandatory Palestine, where he managed the Adif cosmetics factory. He also managed the Urieli company, and was chairman of the board of Oztar HaAmami. In 1946 he was elected chairman of the Palestine branch of the New Zionist Organization, and in the same year was arrested by the British authorities. In 1947 he travelled to South Africa as a Revisionist emissary.

In 1955 he was elected to the Knesset on the Herut list. He was re-elected in 1959, 1961 and 1965, before losing his seat in the 1969 elections. Between 1964 and 1966 he served as chairman of Herut's directorate.

In 1971 he was appointed ambassador to Venezuela, remaining in post until 1974.

He died in 1978 at the age of 75.
