= Kraków Ghetto Jewish Police =

Law enforcement group in the Kraków Ghetto under the General Government

The Kraków Ghetto Jewish Police were a law enforcement service in the Kraków Ghetto, part of the system of the Jewish Ghetto Police (Jüdischer Ordnungsdienst, commonly abbreviated as OD). The OD were subordinated to the Judenrat (Jewish Council) of each ghetto. The Kraków OD, unlike many other Jewish Police forces, served as willing enforcers of Nazi policies and the Gestapo. Among other duties, they oversaw the liquidation of the Kraków Ghetto and helped transport Jews to Bełżec extermination camp.

== Leadership ==
Symcha Spira (also: Symche Spira, Symche Spiro, or Symche Shapiro) was the Chief of the Kraków OD. Tadeusz Pankiewicz said that before the war Spira was an Orthodox Jew who wore a full beard and a long black capote. By the time he became head of the OD, he was clean shaven and wore a tailored uniform bearing many official looking insignias. Unlike the Kraków Judenrat, the Kraków OD were extremely unpopular under Spira's leadership. In part because of Spira's sycophantic qualities, the Kraków OD collaborated with Nazi officials and local police to a greater degree than other ghettos. The Civil Division of the OD in particular worked closely with the Gestapo.

Spira spoke German and Polish poorly. Before the war, he worked as a glazier, making very little money. He was chosen for the position for his extreme loyalty to the Germans, as well as for his derision of his fellow Jews. Spira was known to wear outlandish, tailored uniforms while patrolling the ghetto. He beat and extorted the ghetto's inhabitants, becoming very wealthy under Nazi occupation.

== Duties ==
The Kraków Ghetto OD was created in July 1940, with a force of around 40 men. This number quickly grew, and in December 1940, the force had expanded to an estimated 130 men. The OD police headquarters were located at Jozefinska street 17, not far from Plac Zgody square. There was also a prison in the same building, where Jewish prisoners were kept, before being transferred to Montelupich prison, before being deported to Auschwitz, or just before being shot. Members joined in the hope of being spared punishment from Nazi officials, as well as to leverage additional favors. Many Jews who had joined in the hopes of protecting their community, like some on the Judenrat, quickly resigned when faced with rampant corruption and violence within the force.

The creation of the OD was initially suggested as originating from the Judenrat, in the hope of presenting treatment of the ghetto inhabitants as a Jewish issue. Spira refused to follow the direction of the Judenrat, instead deferring to SS and Gestapo orders. Members of the Judenrat expressed frustration at the actions of the OD, claiming they did not have the interests of fellow Jews in mind.

In general, the duties of most Jewish Police forces revolved around the implementation of German orders. This involved keeping streets clear and addressing crime within the ghetto. Later, many Jewish Police forces would shift to assisting German authorities in rounding up Jews for labor, deportation, and extermination. The Kraków OD often went above and beyond German orders, defying the Judenrat, and arrested Jews who smuggled in food. Extortion, bribery, and physical violence were used by Jewish Police, who recovered food and smuggled items for their own families.

The Kraków OD were unsympathetic to resistance movements within the ghetto, and would arrest suspected members of the Jewish underground without hesitation. The Jewish Police also helped to track, arrest and kill partisans alongside the Gestapo. Underground movements constantly targeted OD members, who feared being accused of collaborating with resisters. The OD patrolled the ghetto carefully, searching for resistance hideouts, which they would then report to the German authorities. This participation made OD members the targets of retaliatory actions from both the Underground and German authorities.

Symcha Spira took advantage of the German authorities' poor view of the Judenrat, and sought to convince Gestapo agents of his superior power and influence over fellow Jews. This included carrying out orders the Judenrat would not. He and other OD men passed bribes to the Gestapo, winning favors and privileges in return. The Gestapo promised OD members safety after the war's end, forging foreign papers for many of the men. Some of the OD men were also given visas for travel to other countries, which they attempted to use as conditions in the ghetto worsened.

== Liquidation of Kraków Ghetto ==
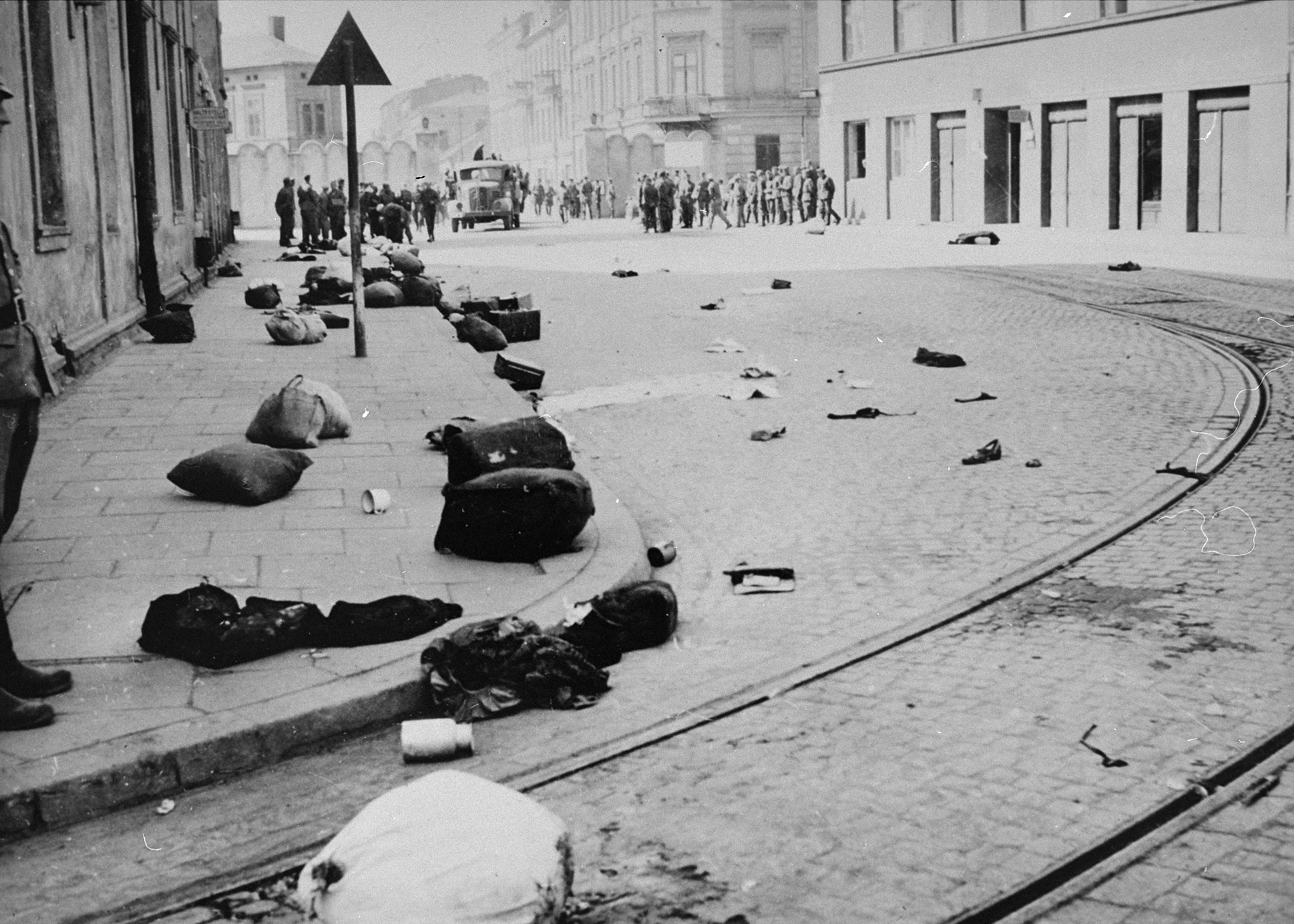
Liquidation of Kraków Ghetto in March 1943

The OD were also in charge of recording and preparing lists of Jews in the ghetto for deportation. They also assisted the German and Polish Blue Police in rounding up Jews. The OD entered houses and apartments at night, taking those selected for removal under cover of darkness. Jews who could not present a work permit or proof of employment were held in the courtyard of the OD building, which had formerly been a Catholic orphanage. The gathered Jews were transported the next morning by railroad car to Bełżec extermination camp.

One of the largest deportations of residents began on May 30, 1942 and lasted until June 8th. This was part of the larger Operation Reinhardt occurring across occupied Poland. Approximately 5,000 Jews without work permits or proper identification were taken via train to Belżec. During this aktion, members of the OD worked alongside German and Polish Blue Police, throwing away luggage, inspecting papers, and beating those who did not comply with orders.

During subsequent deportations, the OD occasionally intervened, bribing officials when family members or friends were selected for deportation. Sometimes this was successful, but other times, even Spira's interventions could not spare everyone. In March 1943, the ghetto was completely liquidated. Those who remained were sent to Plaszów or Auschwitz, or were murdered on site.

The Kraków OD were initially exempted from deportation. After the liquidation of the ghetto, the Jewish Police assisted in cleanup and the processing of items left behind by those deported. They also assisted in moving the bodies of those murdered in the ghetto. Many, including Spira, believed Nazi promises that they would be given their freedom and would be allowed to travel to America or another country after the war. Not long after the liquidation of the ghetto, the OD and all remaining Jews were deported to Płaszów and murdered, including the notorious Symcha Spira and his family, who were executed.

== See also ==
- The Holocaust in Poland
- Żagiew
- Group 13
