= Yohanan Bader =

Irgun member and Israeli politician

- יוחנן בדר
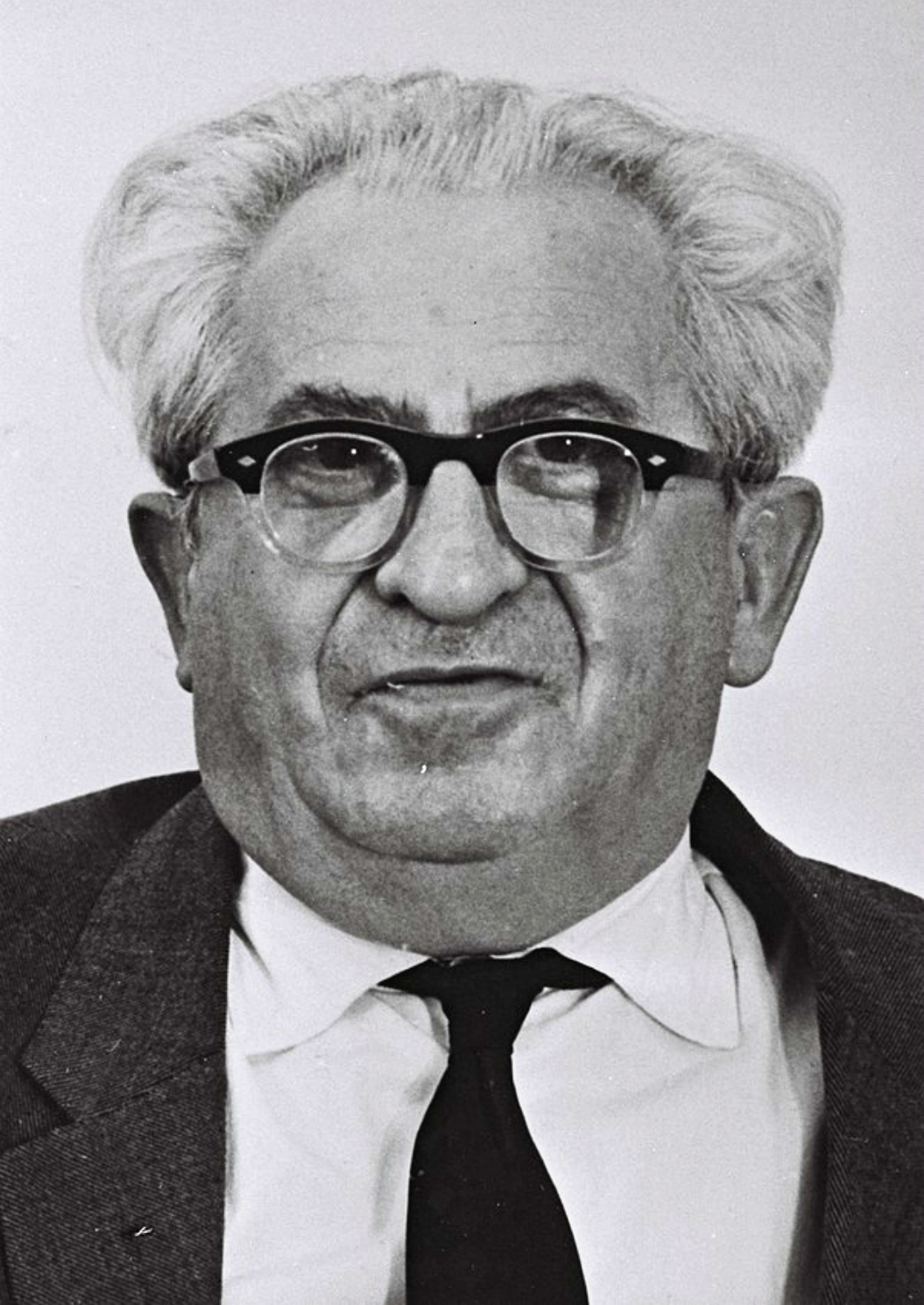

Faction represented in the Knesset
- 1949–1965: Herut
- 1965–1974: Gahal
- 1974–1977: Likud

Personal details
- Born: 19 August 1901 Kraków, Austria-Hungary
- Died: 16 June 1994 (aged 92) Ramat Gan

Yohanan Bader, Jan Bader (Hebrew: יוחנן בדר; 19 August 1901 – 16 June 1994) was a Revisionist Zionist leader and Israeli politician.

== Biography ==
Yochanan Bader was born as Jan Bader in Kraków in Austria-Hungary (today Poland), where he studied at a State Gymnasium. In his youth he was active in the Jewish Socialist Party, the "Bund" followed by "HaShomer Hatzair" but in 1925 he joined the Revisionist Zionist Movement. He studied law, economics, philosophy and history at Jagiellonian University, where he earned his Doctor of Law degree and was certified as a lawyer. He also edited the Polish language weekly Trybuna Narodowa.

He was one of the leaders of Nowa Organizacja Syjonistyczna (New Zionist Organization). Other leaders were Yosef Shofman and Ya'acov Cohen.

In September 1939, Bader moved to East Poland, then under Soviet rule; he was arrested and sentenced to hard labor in northern Russia in 1940. In 1941, he was released under the terms of the Soviet-Polish Agreement and left the Soviet Union; in August 1942 he joined the Free Polish Army. In December 1943, he immigrated to Palestine and joined the Irgun. In 1945, he was arrested by the British authorities and imprisoned in the Latrun Camp until May 1948.

== Political career ==
Bader was one of the founders and ideologists of the Herut Movement in 1948 and editor of the newspaper Herut.

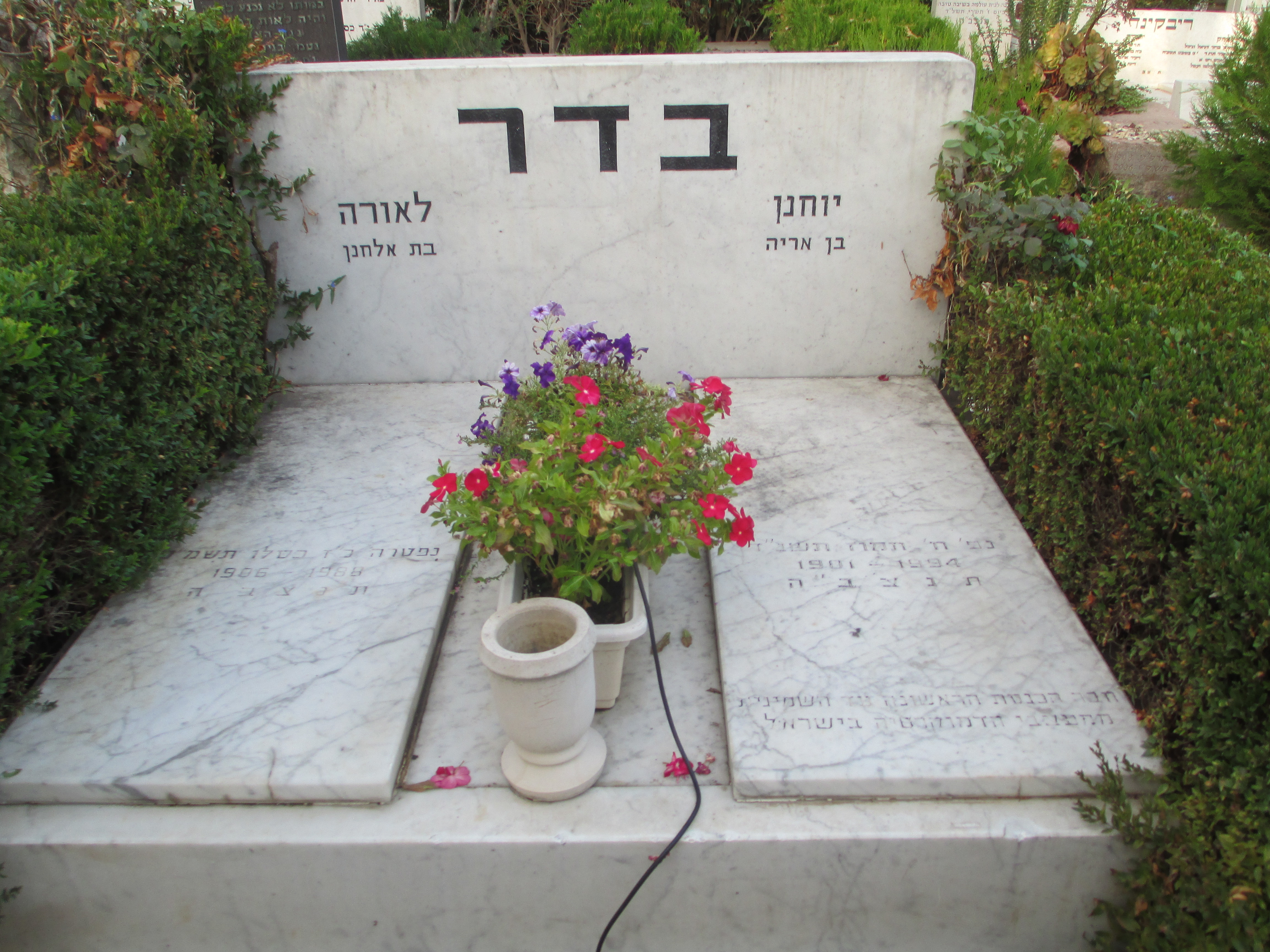
Grave of Bader and his wife

He was member of the Knesset for Herut and its successors, Gahal and Likud, from 1949 to 1977, a regular member of the Finance Committee, and was the economic spokesman of his movement; he is remembered for his rhetoric debates with former Minister of Finance Levi Eshkol. He was also chairman of the Committee on State Control. He is famous for the amendment to the election law, which became valid since the elections to the Eighth Knesset, according to which the excess votes are distributed to the lists with the largest number of voters per seat – a method known in the world as the D'Hondt method, and is known in Israel as the Bader-Ofer method – named after Bader (Gahal) and co-proposer Avraham Ofer (Alignment).

Bader retired before the 1977 elections (which Likud won). He died in 1994 in Ramat Gan and was buried in the Nachalat Yitzhak cemetery. Streets in Ramat Gan and Be'er Sheva are named after him.

== Published works ==
- The Knesset and Me (1979) (in Hebrew)

== See also ==
- Newspapers of Israel
