= Avraham Shekhterman =

Israeli politician (1910–1986)

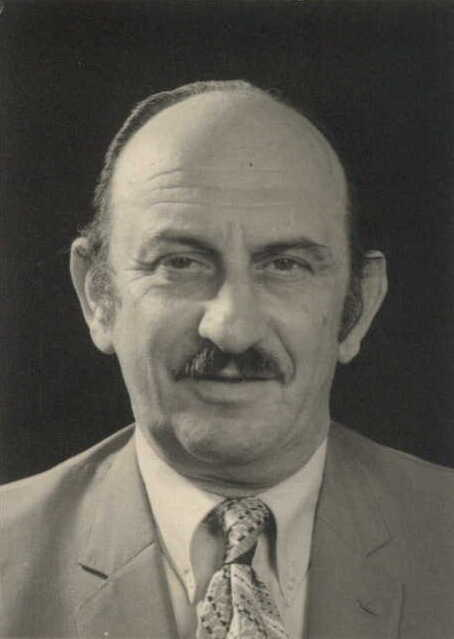
- Shekhterman during his time in the Knesset

Faction represented in the Knesset
- 1969–1974: Gahal
- 1974–1977: Likud

Personal details
- Born: 3 December 1910 Odessa, Russian Empire
- Died: 7 December 1986 (aged 76)

Avraham Shekhterman (Hebrew: אברהם שכטרמן; 3 December 1910 – 7 December 1986) was an Israeli politician who served as a member of the Knesset for Gahal and Likud between 1969 and 1977. He was the older brother of Herzl Shafir, a general in the Israel Defense Forces.

== Biography ==
Born in Odessa in the Russian Empire (today in Ukraine), Shekhterman emigrated to Mandatory Palestine in 1924. He attended high school in Tel Aviv and in 1927 he joined Betar, later becoming one of its commanders. He studied civil engineering at Ghent University, where he chaired the Jewish Students Organisation, as well as working as a Betar instructor in Antwerp.

He helped establish Kfar Yavetz in 1932. In 1936 he joined the Betar faction of the Haganah, later becoming an Irgun member after it broke away from the Haganah. In 1938 he became political editor of the HaMashkif newspaper, the publication of the Revisionist Party. Between 1943 and 1946 he managed the Potash Company at the Dead Sea.

Shekhterman was involved in promoting aviation in Palestine. In preparation for establishing a Jewish air force, he used his contacts to convince the British Mandate's Department of Civilian Aviation to approve a flight school at an airfield in Lod. Between 1939 and 1945 he chaired the Tel Aviv Pilots Club.

Shekhterman served as a member of the Assembly of Representatives. In 1955 he was elected to Tel Aviv city council, remaining a member until 1965 and serving as deputy mayor between 1957 and 1959. In 1969 he was elected to the Knesset on the Gahal list. He was re-elected in 1973, by which time Gahal had merged into Likud, but lost his seat in the 1977 elections.
