= National Labor Federation in Eretz-Israel =

NLF
- National Labor Federation in Eretz-Israel
- Histadrut Haovdim Haleumit
- Founded: 1934
- Headquarters: Tel-Aviv, Israel
- Location: Israel
- Key people: Yoav Simhi (Chairman), Itamar Sharoni (CEO)
- Affiliations: Independent
- Website: www.histadrut.net?categoryId=51903

National Labor Federation in Eretz-Israel (NLF) (Hebrew: הסתדרות העובדים הלאומית, romanized: Histadrut Ha'ovdim Haleumit) is a national trade union center in Israel.

The NLF is Israel's second largest labor union (after the Histadrut which has 800,000 members), with 100,000-200,000 workers represented by the union, including at least 90,000 dues paying members.

== History ==
In April 1934, the Hatzohar and Betar Workers' Union severed its ties with the Histadrut (General Organization of Workers in Israel) and its institutions in Mandatory Palestine and established the National Labor Federation in Eretz-Israel (NLF). The NLF promoted social compromise and cooperation between the social classes. This would be achieved, not via workers' strikes, but through national arbitration initiated by the parties. The NLF's main purpose was to act as the Revisionist movement's alternative to the Histadrut labour federation.

While not politically affiliated, it is seen as sympathetic to Likud, as both are rooted originally from the Revisionist Zionist movement.
