= Jewish collaboration with Nazi Germany =

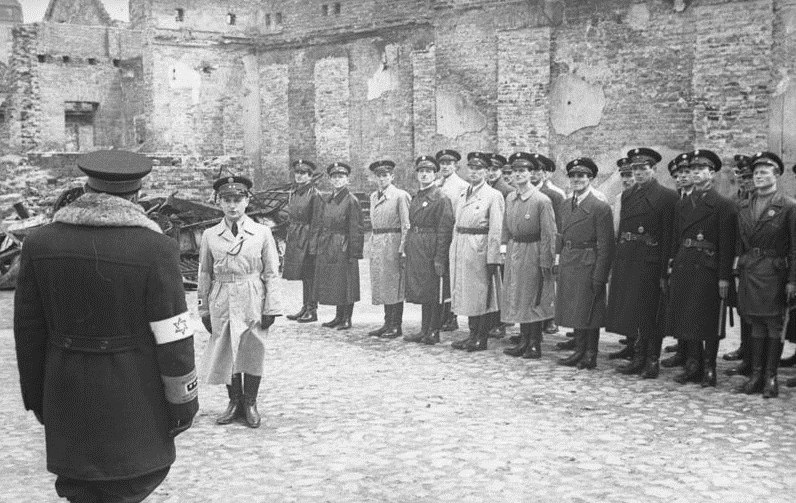
Jewish Ghetto Police in the Warsaw Ghetto, May 1941

Jewish collaboration with Nazi Germany involved Jews working, voluntarily or involuntarily, with the regime of Nazi Germany, before and during World War II. Collaboration included Jewish institutions in Nazi-created ghettos and Jewish agents working for the German secret services. After the end of the war, alleged Jewish collaborators were put on trial in Israel, Europe and the Soviet Union.

The phenomenon of Jewish collaboration is highly contested by scholars.

== Debate on collaboration ==
Some scholars argue that the very notion of Jewish collaboration is paradoxical, since it requires a voluntary, ideological alignment with Nazi principles, which were avowedly anti-Jewish; since most collaboration was not motivated ideologically, it is suggested that true collaboration was exceptionally rare or perhaps nonexistent.

After World War II started in 1939, according to Yehuda Bauer, the only Jewish collaborationist group in occupied Europe was the "Group 13" that existed in the Warsaw Ghetto, whose collaboration was based on the belief in the inevitability of German victory. According to Bauer, in the case of other Jewish groups, one should speak rather of "forced cooperation," although, as he points out, some groups came close to collaboration. According to Evgeny Finkel, defining "cooperation" in this way is problematic with regard to the activities of some Judenrat leaders and Jewish police, who were corrupt and despotic, and whose actions were guided primarily by the desire for profit and their own survival. Finkel proposes defining cooperation as activity aimed at the survival of the community and its individual members, while collaboration would be activity to the detriment of the community or the survival of individual Jews. Finkel stresses that cooperation was always open and visible, while collaboration could be public or private, often secret.

In most cases, Jews who chose to collaborate did so to guarantee their personal survival, as did other ethnic groups who collaborated with Nazi Germany. The phenomenon of Jewish collaboration was often exploited by nationalist apologists from groups deeply implicated in the Holocaust, who used it to minimize their own groups' role in the extermination of the Jews.

== History ==
=== Judenrat and Ghetto Police ===
In German-occupied Europe during World War II, Jews, Romani, and some other minorities, were destined for removal, first through ghettoization and exile, and finally through extermination. To streamline the process of excluding Jews, and to ease the burden of management, Germans established Jewish institutions in the ghettos. These included, first and foremost, Jewish administrative boards, usually called Judenrat, and the Jewish Ghetto Police, responsible for maintaining order in the ghettos. Formally, the Jewish police were subordinate to the Judenrats, but in most ghettos they quickly became independent of them and even gained a higher position, reporting directly to the Germans.

The activities of the first wave of Judenrat leaders were primarily aimed at improving the well-being of the communities they headed. Only their successors, chosen by the Germans from among the most corrupt, were blind executors of German orders and acted mainly for their own self-interest. In some of the larger ghettos, the Judenrats were forced to prepare lists and hand over people to the Germans for deportation. More often, only the Jewish police took part in deportations. In most places this never happened. The Jewish police were widely hated among other Jews, and their members were far more likely to be corrupt and self-interested than the Judenrat leaders. In 14 ghettos, Jewish police cooperated with the resistance movement.

=== Jewish agents and informers ===
A separate form of collaboration was the activity of Jewish agents and informers of the German secret services and police. In most cases, they acted voluntarily, for monetary reward, power and status. They also believed collaboration increased their chance for survival. In Berlin, the Gestapo mobilized Jewish informants under threat of death.

Witold Mędykowski assesses this phenomenon as marginal; in a population of 15-20 thousand people in the Kraków Ghetto, the number of informers is estimated at between a dozen and several dozen people. Informers were fought by the Jewish resistance, and by the Polish resistance if their activities harmed the Polish underground. The "Group 13" from the Warsaw ghetto, led by Abraham Gancwajch, was the only organized group of Jewish collaboraters with the Germans on the basis of ideology.

The Nazis also used agents who were Jewish to arrest Jews hiding outside the ghetto or trying to escape from it. These agents also helped find people involved in smuggling, producing illegal documents or having contacts with the underground. They were widely regarded as influential people who could get things done with the Germans. They often took advantage of their position by taking bribes or helping selected individuals. Nazi agents who were Jewish include Stella Goldschlag, Ans van Dijk and Betje Wery.

== Aftermath ==
=== Israel ===
A 1950 Israeli law passed by the First Knesset criminalised Jewish collaboration with the Nazis. Under this law, around forty alleged Jewish collaborators were put on trial between 1951 and 1972, of whom two-thirds were convicted.

=== Europe ===
In Poland after the war, 1,800 people were convicted by the courts for antisemitic persecution during the war. Among them, 44 were Jews; in their proceeding Central Committee of Polish Jews participated actively. In Western Europe, Jews accused of collaboration faced honour courts. In Sweden, a similar Jewish honor court operated in Stockholm. In one documented case, the court tried Herbert Schultz, a former Jewish ghetto and camp functionary accused of collaboration and mistreatment of fellow Jews. Presided over by Rabbi Abraham Israel Jacobson, the court ruled in November 1948 that Schultz's actions had been "brutal and unworthy of a Jew," but declined to impose punishment, weighing mitigating circumstances against his conduct as well as sympathy for the Schultzes, who had both lost their children during the war.

=== Soviet Union ===
In the Soviet Union, Jewish collaborators, such as police officers, were initially tried like any other collaborator for "treason to the motherland."

== See also ==
- Collaboration with Nazi Germany and Fascist Italy
- German Jewish military personnel of World War II
- Joseph Joanovici

== Bibliography ==
- Blum, Alain; Chopard, Thomas; Koustova, Emilia (2020). "Survivors, Collaborators and Partisans?". Jahrbücher für Geschichte Osteuropas. 68 (2): 222–255. doi:10.25162/jgo-2020-0008. JSTOR 27011586. S2CID 234169545.
- Bauer, Yehuda (2001). Rethinking the Holocaust.
- Finder, Gabriel N.; Prusin, Alexander V. (2008). "Jewish Collaborators on Trial in Poland 1944–1956". Polin: Studies in Polish Jewry. 20: 122–148. doi:10.3828/polin.2008.20.122. JSTOR j.ctv13qfv1t.
- Finkel, Evgeny (2017). Ordinary Jews. Choice and Survival during the Holocaust.
- Grabowski, Jan (2008). "Szantażowanie Żydów: casus Warszawy 1939-1945" [Blackmailing the Jews: The Case Warsaw 1939-1945]. Przegląd Historyczny. 99 (4): 583–602.
- Levine, Herbert S. (1975). "A Jewish Collaborator in Nazi Germany: The Strange Career of Georg Kareski, 1933-37". Central European History. 8 (3): 251–281. doi:10.1017/S0008938900017933. JSTOR 4545746. S2CID 145668925.
- Mędykowski, Witold (2006). "Przeciw swoim: Wzorce kolaboracji żydowskiej w Krakowie i okolicy" [Against Their Own: Patterns of Jewish Collaboration in and around Kraków]. Zagłada Żydów. Studia i Materiały. 2 (2): 202–220. doi:10.32927/ZZSiM.187.
- Person, Katarzyna (2022). "Rehabilitation of Individuals Suspected of Collaboration: The Jewish Civic Court under the Central Committee of Jews in Poland, 1946–1950". In Le Bourhis, Eric; Tcherneva, Irina; Voisin, Vanessa (eds.). Seeking Accountability for Nazi and War Crimes in East and Central Europe: A People's Justice?. pp. 261–282.
