= Symcha Spira =

Nazi collaborator who served as a Commander of Krakow's Jewish Ghetto Police

- Died: 1944; Płaszów concentration camp
- Other name: SS
- Occupation: Commander of the Krakow Jüdischer Ordnungsdienst
- Known for: Collaborating with the Nazis during World War II

Symcha Spira (? – 1944), also known as Symche Spira, served as the head of the Krakow ghetto Jewish police during the Holocaust.

== Biography ==
According to survivors' testimony, before World War II Spira was an impoverished glazier and carpenter who practiced Orthodox Judaism. He was known to wear a full beard and kapoteh.

In the early days of the Krakow ghetto, Spira served as a low level clerk for the Judenrat.

In the summer of 1940 the Jüdischer Ordnungsdienst (OD) of Krakow was established, and Spira filed for a transfer. While serving there he quickly found favor in the eyes of the Germans, despite being near illiterate and having difficulty communicating in both German and Polish. After his transfer, he became a commander of the Kraków Ghetto Jewish Police, at the recommendation of the German forces. After taking this role his appearance changed, as he adopted the police uniform in place of religious wear and removed his beard entirely.

One power that Spira's proximity to the SS gave was his ability to facilitate bribes for work identification cards on behalf of the residents of the ghetto. The ghetto residents came to distrust him, believing that he was a Gestapo collaborator and giving him the nickname "SS," after the Nazi force. Many have even gone as far to accuse him of megalomania and using his position to enrich himself.

In 1942 an orphanage was established in the ghetto, which also acted as a daycare. This building was placed under the jurisdiction of Spira. He held religious services there for the High Holy Days. Several people, both Jews and ethnic Poles, joined his police force in 1942.

After the liquidation of the Krakow ghetto, the Krakow Jews Police and Judenrat were deported to Płaszów. Spira was arrested alongside the other members of the OD, but was released for a short period at the request of the Gestapo. He was rearrested in December 1943, and was executed in 1944 on the orders of Amon Göth.

== Legacy ==
Spira's actions were included in Thomas Keneally's book Schindler's Ark, the basis of the film Schindler's List.
