= Aryeh Altman =

Israeli politician (1902–1982)

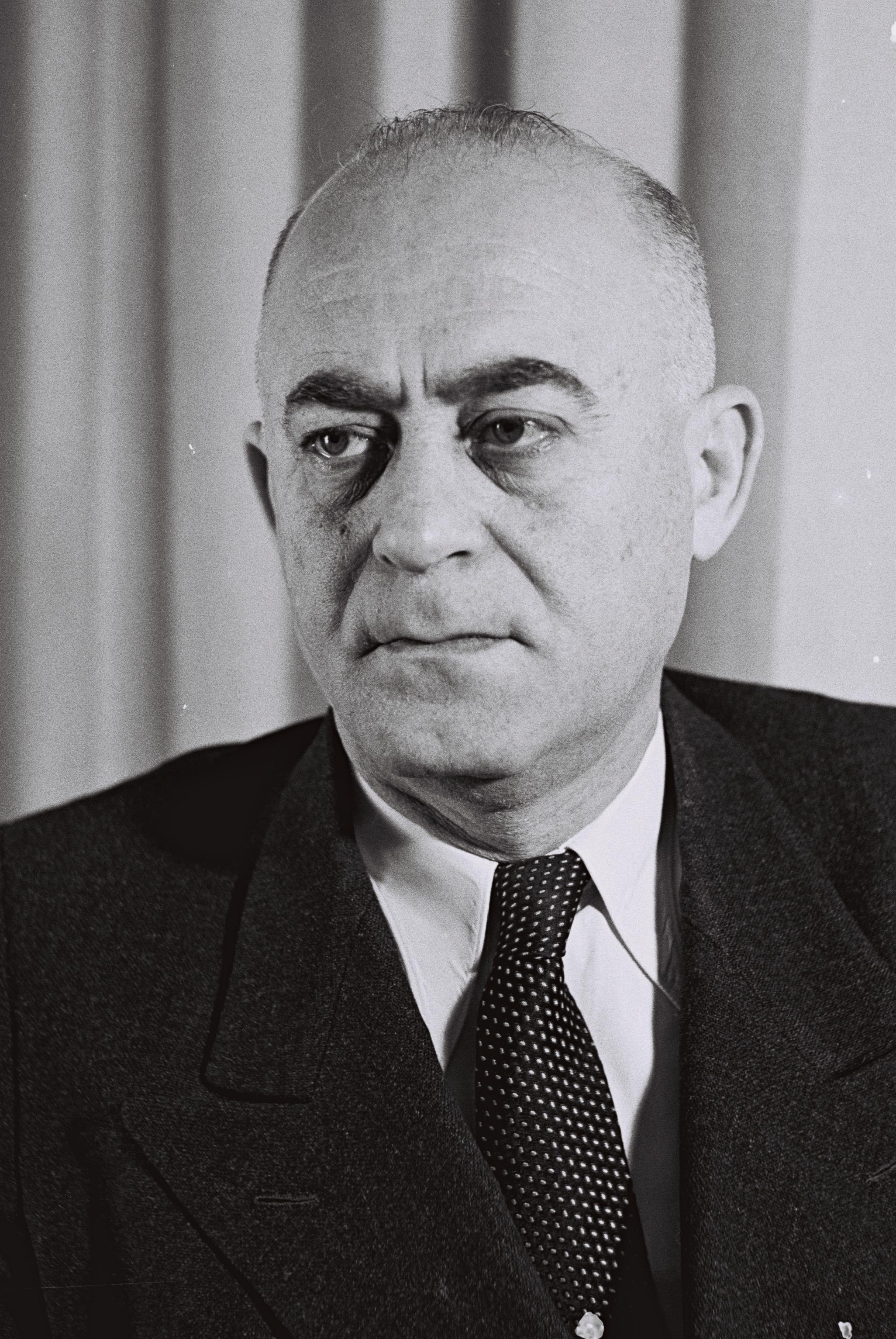
- Altman in 1951

Faction represented in the Knesset
- 1951–1965: Herut
- 1965: Gahal

Personal details
- Born: 6 January 1902 Balta, Russian Empire
- Died: 21 August 1982 (aged 80)

Aryeh Altman (Hebrew: אריה אלטמן, 6 January 1902 – 21 August 1982) was an Israeli politician who served as a member of the Knesset for Herut and Gahal between 1951 and 1965.

== Biography ==
Born in Balta in the Russian Empire (today in Ukraine), Altman studied law and economics at Odessa University. In 1921 he joined Tze'irei Zion, and chaired the organisation until 1924. After being imprisoned three times by Soviet authorities, he was sent into exile in 1924. He emigrated to Mandatory Palestine in 1925, and was amongst the founders of the Working Zionists Organization. In 1927 Altman moved to the United States to study sociology and political science at the University of Detroit and then New York University, where he was awarded a PhD in 1935.

== Political career ==
In 1928 he joined the Revisionist Zionism movement, and three years later was elected head of the Revisionist Zionists of America. He returned to Palestine in 1935 following the completion of his PhD, and joined the editorial staff of HaYarden, a Revisionist publication, where he headed the Foreign Affairs department.

In 1937 he became head of the Palestine branch of the Revisionist Zionist Movement, and the following year became a member of the World Presidium of the movement. Between 1939 and 1940 he was a member of the Jewish National Council.

Following Ze'ev Jabotinsky's death in 1940 he became head of the Revisionist Zionist's political department. In 1943 he went to Turkey as an emissary to try to save European Jews from the Holocaust.

In 1945 he became chairman of the Presidium of the Revisionist Zionist Movement. In the 1949 Knesset elections he headed the Brit Hatzohar list, but it failed to cross the electoral threshold. He then joined the rival Revisionist movement Herut and was elected to the Knesset on its list in 1951. He was re-elected in 1955, 1959 and 1961, before losing his seat in the 1965 elections.

Between 1955 and 1965 he also served as a member of Jerusalem city council. He died in 1982 at the age of 80.
