= Żagiew =

Jewish underground magazine, 1942–1943

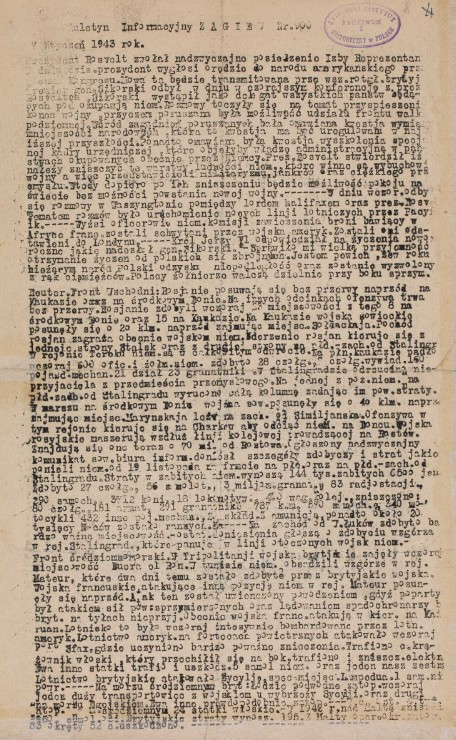
- Editor: Adam Szajn (since December 1942)
- Categories: underground magazine
- First issue: February 1942
- Final issue: February 1943
- Country: German-occupied Poland
- Based in: Warsaw Ghetto
- Language: Polish

Żagiew (Polish for torch) was an underground magazine published in the Warsaw Ghetto by assimilated Jews.

In the first half of 1942, five issues of the magazine under this title were published. The identities of those responsible for its publication remain unknown. The activity of Żagiew ceased in the summer of 1942 during the Grossaktion Warsaw. However, later that same year, a magazine once again appeared in the ghetto under the Żagiew banner. It published information about the situation on the fronts of World War II, as well as calls for both passive and active resistance against further deportations. The exact goals of the group behind the second phase of Żagiew are difficult to determine. Its editor-in-chief, Adam Szajn, was killed by the Jewish Combat Organization in February 1943.

After the war, Żagiew became the subject of numerous myths and distortions. It was described as a Gestapo agency (under the name “Jewish Freedom Guard”), and nearly all Jewish informers and collaborators in the Warsaw Ghetto were retroactively linked to it. However, there is a lack of evidence that Żagiew —particularly in its first incarnation—had any actual ties to the Nazi security apparatus.

== History ==
=== Before Grossaktion Warsaw ===
Żagiew was an underground magazine published by assimilated Jews who, under Nazi racial laws, had been confined to the Warsaw Ghetto. It appeared between February and August 1942. A total of five issues were published; three have survived— the first issued in February and the last surviving one at the end of May. The title referred to a prewar magazine published in Poland by assimilationist circles.

The editorial line of Żagiew expressed unequivocal loyalty to the Polish state, advocating, among other things, the inviolability of the borders of the Second Polish Republic. It also strongly condemned all forms of collaboration with the Germans. At the same time, Żagiew had a distinctly anti-communist ideological profile. Due in part to the fact that assimilationists were socially isolated within the ghetto, it has not been possible to identify the individuals behind the publication.

The appearance of Żagiew was initially met with some suspicion by the Polish Underground State. Informants of the Jewish Affairs Bureau of the Home Army Headquarters reported that assimilationist circles in the ghetto were distancing themselves from the magazine. However, in later Polish reports, Żagiew’s association with those circles was no longer questioned.

The activity of Żagiew ceased in the summer of 1942, as a result of the large-scale deportation action conducted by the Germans in the Warsaw Ghetto at that time.

=== "Second Żagiew" ===
Between December 1942 and February 1943, a magazine once again appeared in the Warsaw Ghetto under the banner of Żagiew. Eleven issues have survived. The first was titled Biuletyn Informacyjny Organizacji Żagiew. Komunikaty Wojenne ("Information Bulletin of the Żagiew Organization. War Reports"), while the subsequent ones were published under the title Biuletyn Informacyjny Żagiew ("Żagiew Information Bulletin"). The editor-in-chief was reportedly Adam Szajn (Sztejn). According to Dawid Efroz, author of one of the eyewitness accounts from the Warsaw Ghetto, Szajn lived in the brushmakers’ shop area and owned a radio. He was considered useful due to certain alleged contacts he maintained with the Germans.

The second Żagiew, like its earlier iteration, was probably a Jewish initiative but one rooted in Polish patriotism. The bulletin mainly published information about the course of World War II, obtained through listening to BBC broadcasts and the Soviet-controlled Polish-language "Tadeusz Kościuszko radio station". There were relatively fewer references to the situation within the ghetto itself. The bulletin listed the names of the most active informants and collaborators in the ghetto, emphasizing the need for their elimination. It also included—especially after the January Action—calls for both passive and active resistance against further deportation attempts.

Certain indications suggest that individuals associated with the Żagiew group may have maintained contacts with the Revisionist underground operating in the Warsaw Ghetto. According to a report written in May 1943 by Home Army intelligence officer Antoni Janiszewski, alias “Karol”, both groups had established contact prior to the January action. However, cooperation ultimately failed because Żagiew:

Repelled people by its press pronouncements that it acted on behalf of the Polish government and by publishing a proscription list containing the names of entirely decent people.

The Jewish Combat Organization (Żydowska Organizacja Bojowa, ŻOB), by contrast, took an unequivocally hostile stance toward Żagiew, viewing it as a Gestapo provocation aimed at triggering a premature outbreak of the uprising in the ghetto. According to a ŻOB statement dated March 3, 1943, Adam Szajn was executed by ŻOB fighters on February 28 of the same year for "editing the vile Gestapo publication Żagiew" as well as for "informing and corrupting Jewish political life." (Note: Adam Janiszewski, codename “Karol”, incorrectly attributed the liquidation of Sztajn to the Jewish Military Union, dating it to the first half of April 1943. See: Libionka & Weinbaum (2012), p. 690.) In a list of individuals liquidated by ŻOB compiled by Emanuel Ringelblum, Szajn (listed as “Adaś Szejn”) is described as a "Gestapo agent, editor of the illegal provocational Żagiew."

== Myth of Jewish's Gestapo Agency ==
After the war, many myths grew around Żagiew. This was largely the result of the activities of Tadeusz Bednarczyk—a self-proclaimed veteran of the Polish resistance movement and one of the spiritus movens behind a long-standing effort to falsify the history of the Jewish Military Union (Żydowski Związek Wojskowy, ŻZW).

According to Bednarczyk, Żagiew was supposedly a cover name for an organization called the Żydowska Gwardia Wolności ("Jewish Guard of Freedom"), which he claimed was an extensive Gestapo intelligence network operating in the Warsaw Ghetto. (Note: On the other hand, Bernard Ber Mark, in his 1953 book The Uprising in the Warsaw Ghetto, described Żagiew as "a propaganda mouthpiece of the London-based reactionary forces". See: Libionka & Weinbaum (2012), p. 1164.) Allegedly, Żagiew had over a thousand Jewish secret agents, some of whom were even permitted by their Gestapo handlers to carry firearms. Some authors have claimed that Żagiew agents were also instrumental in organizing the Hotel Polski affair in Warsaw — a German scheme designed to lure thousands of wealthy Jews, under false promises of evacuation to South America, into a trap in order to extort their money and valuables before killing most of them. Even the publishers of the Żagiew magazine from the first half of 1942 were accused of serving German interests. Over time, nearly all Jewish collaborators and Gestapo informers in Warsaw—including Abraham Gancwajch and members of his so-called Group 13—came to be retrospectively counted among the ranks of Żagiew. Furthermore, Bednarczyk claimed that the ŻZW had supposedly fought a constant and victorious struggle against Żagiew. The fighters of this organization allegedly liquidated as many as 59 members of Żagiew. According to Dariusz Libionka and Laurence Weinbaum, "These nonsenses have unfortunately taken root even in serious historical literature." In reality, there is no evidence whatsoever that the Żagiew magazine published in the first half of 1942 was inspired by the Nazi security apparatus.

In his article from 2006, Maciej Wójcicki supported the thesis that the second Żagiew was a Gestapo provocation. In his view, calls published in the magazine for the organization of craft workshops (so-called "shops") in the ghetto were particularly indicative of German inspiration. In the online Encyclopedia of the Warsaw Ghetto compiled by the Jewish Historical Institute, however, "Żagiew" is categorized as an underground publication.

Libionka and Weinbaum leave the question of Żagiew’s alleged cooperation with the Gestapo open. They noted, however, that the content of the surviving issues suggests that the editorial line of the bulletin—especially the calls for armed resistance against efforts to liquidate the Warsaw Ghetto—was fundamentally at odds with the interests of the Nazis, who were focused on the efficient transfer of ghetto-based workshops, along with their machinery and workers, to labor camps in the Lublin region.

== Bibliography ==
- Komorowski, Krzysztof, ed. (2014). Warszawa walczy 1939–1945. Leksykon [Warsaw Fights 1939–1945: A Lexicon] (in Polish). Warsaw: Bellona. ISBN 978-83-11-13474-4.
- Libionka, Dariusz; Weinbaum, Laurence (2012). Bohaterowie, hochsztaplerzy, opowiadacze. Wokół Żydowskiego Związku Wojskowego [e-book/epub] [Heroes, Hucksters, and Storytellers: On the Jewish Military Union] (in Polish). Warsaw: Stowarzyszenie Centrum Badań nad Zagładą Żydów. ISBN 978-83-63444-15-0.
- Piotrowski, Tadeusz (1997). Poland's Holocaust: Ethnic Strife, Collaboration with Occupying Forces and Genocide…. Jefferson, NC and London: McFarland & Company. ISBN 0-7864-0371-3.
- Ringelblum, Emanuel (1988). Stosunki polsko-żydowskie w czasie drugiej wojny światowej: uwagi i spostrzeżenia [Polish–Jewish Relations During World War II: Notes and Observations] (in Polish). Warsaw: Czytelnik. ISBN 83-07-01686-X.
- Wójcicki, Maciej (2006). "Jewish Military Union in Warsaw Ghetto". Kwartalnik Historii Żydów (in Polish). 1 (217). ISSN 1899-3044.
