= HaMashkif =

Revisionist Zionist weekly newspaper (1938–1948)

HaMashkif המשקיף
- Type: Daily newspaper
- Owner: Hatzohar
- Founded: 1938
- Ceased publication: 1948
- Language: Hebrew
- Country: Mandatory Palestine
- Free online archives: Online, searchable HaMashkif editions from the Historical Jewish Press

HaMashkif (Hebrew: המשקיף, lit. 'The Observer') was a Hebrew language daily newspaper in Mandatory Palestine. Published between 1938 and 1948, it was owned by Hatzohar, the Revisionist party.

The newspaper was established in 1938 in Tel Aviv, succeeding the Revisionist journals Hazit HaAm and HaYarden. From 1940 until the paper's closure in 1948, it was edited by Izik Ramba. It closed in 1948 following Israeli independence and the dissolution of Hatzohar, and was replaced by Herut, the journal of the new Revisionist Herut party.

Contributors included Avraham Shekhterman, who edited its political section and later served as a member of the Knesset for Gahal and Likud.
