= Moshe Merin =

Polish Judenrat leader

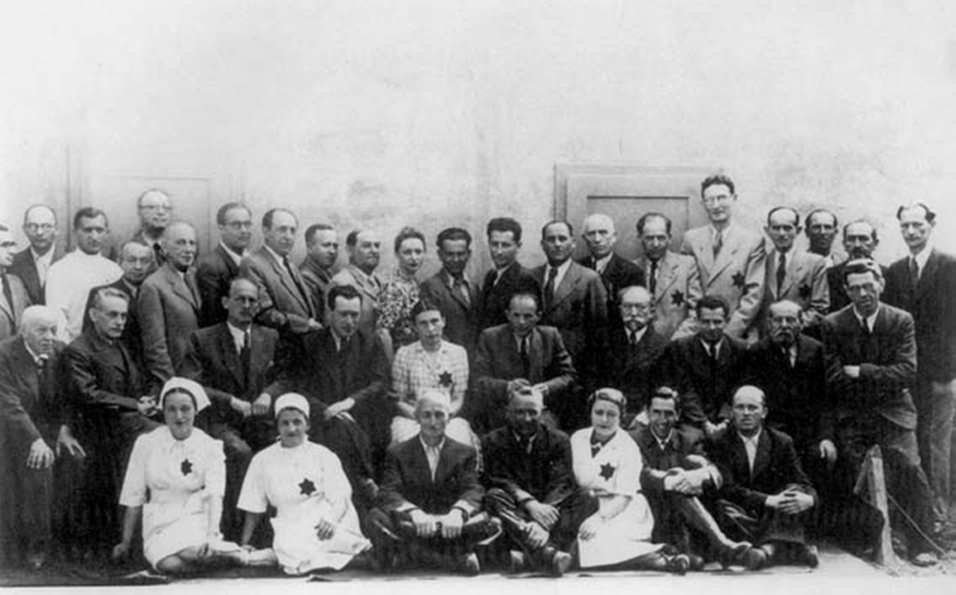
- Jewish Council in the Sosnowiec Ghetto, Merin sitting fifth from right, middle row
- Born: 1905; Sosnowiec, Congress Poland, Russian Empire
- Died: June 1943 (aged 37–38); Auschwitz-Birkenau, German-occupied Poland
- Other names: Mojżesz Israel Merin
- Occupation: Jewish Community Council
- Known for: Sosnowiec Ghetto leadership

Moshe (Mosheh) Merin (also Moniek Merin and Moszek or Mojżesz Israel Merin in Polish; 1905 – June 1943) was the head of the Jewish Community Council, or Judenrat, in the Sosnowiec Ghetto during the Nazi German occupation of Poland in World War II. It is believed that he was murdered in the Auschwitz concentration camp. As with most Jewish Council leadership of the time, his actions or lack thereof during the Holocaust in occupied Poland are highly controversial.

== Life ==
Moniek Merin was born in Sosnowiec (Sosnovitz) in the Prussian Partition, at the border with Austria-Hungary. He was married twice and divorced. His teenage daughter from the marriage to Marysia (Mania) Gancwajch, Halinka Merin, survived the Holocaust according to USHMM records, saved by a Polish farmer, name unknown. Merin made his living by trading goods before the Nazi-Soviet invasion of Poland. He was described by others as an unstable and impulsive man.

=== World War II ===
After the German takeover of Sosnowiec on September 4, 1939, Merin presented himself to the Nazis as head of the Sosnowiec Community Council, when the former president (from before the invasion of Poland), Lejzerowicz, remained silent in a meeting with the German officers. Merin reported from behind the last row of community members subjected to a 24-hour detention in a public bath. It remains unclear whether or not he was on the pre-war council; his advance rested on the fact that he could speak the German language. Such was the beginning of his career as chairman of the Judenrat in the Sosnowiec Ghetto and the adjacent Będzin Ghetto forming a single administrative unit.

=== Consolidation of power ===
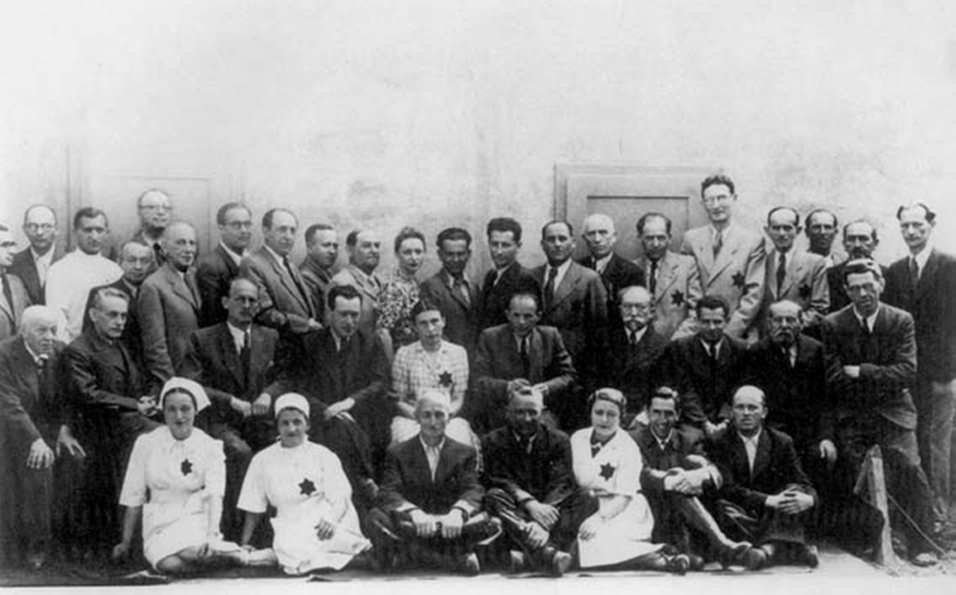
Moszek Merin (sitting in the centre) with the Sosnowiec Council

In January 1940, Merin was installed by the Nazis as leader of the Central Office of the Jewish Council of Elders in East Upper Silesia (German: Zentrale der Jüdische Ältestenräte Ostoberschlesien), responsible for some 45 Jewish communities of approximately 100,000 Polish Jews. Within a year, he controlled dozens of Judenräte. Merin is noted to have been very harsh in his dealings with the Jewish groups opposing occupation including Hanoar Hazioni, Hashomer Hatzair, Gordonia, Poalei Zion, and Hitachdut. Merin aided the Nazis in the hunt for the leaders of the aforementioned groups, going so far as to place a request for their arrest and signing their execution orders himself. He did this with full cooperation of the Jewish Police Force, whose leader fervently defended Merin's every decision.

Merin's approach was similar to that of Chaim Rumkowski's, Judenälteste of the Łódź Ghetto, in that he was convinced that by tying the Jews in his ghettos to forced labor, some would survive the war. However, Merin engaged in extortions going far beyond what other ghetto leaders would ever attempt. On one occasion, Merin requested 15,000 zlotys of ransom for each of the 100 prisoners he promised to free from the deadly slave labour. The amount was three-hundred-times higher than the highest similar ransom collected in the Lublin Ghetto. None of the Jews were released, and the money was never refunded. Like Rumkowski, Merin attempted to make justifications for the 25,000 Jews he helped to deport by claiming that their sacrifice enabled the survival of those who remained as he stated: "If I have lost only 25 percent when I could have lost all, who can wish better results?" It is because of his insistence on fulfilling every German request that Merin has been depicted as a Nazi collaborator.

Merin reconfigured the leadership of his councils by expelling those who opposed his methods, and by appointing Jews loyal only to him, including his brother-in-law and a notorious criminal, Abraham Gancwajch, to carry out further Nazi orders in Sosnowiec and its surrounding area. In spite of his full cooperation with the Nazis, Merin was sent to Auschwitz-Birkenau in June 1943, one month before the last Holocaust transport left the Sosnowiec Ghetto.
