= Group 13 =

Group of Jewish collaborators with the Nazis in the Warsaw Ghetto

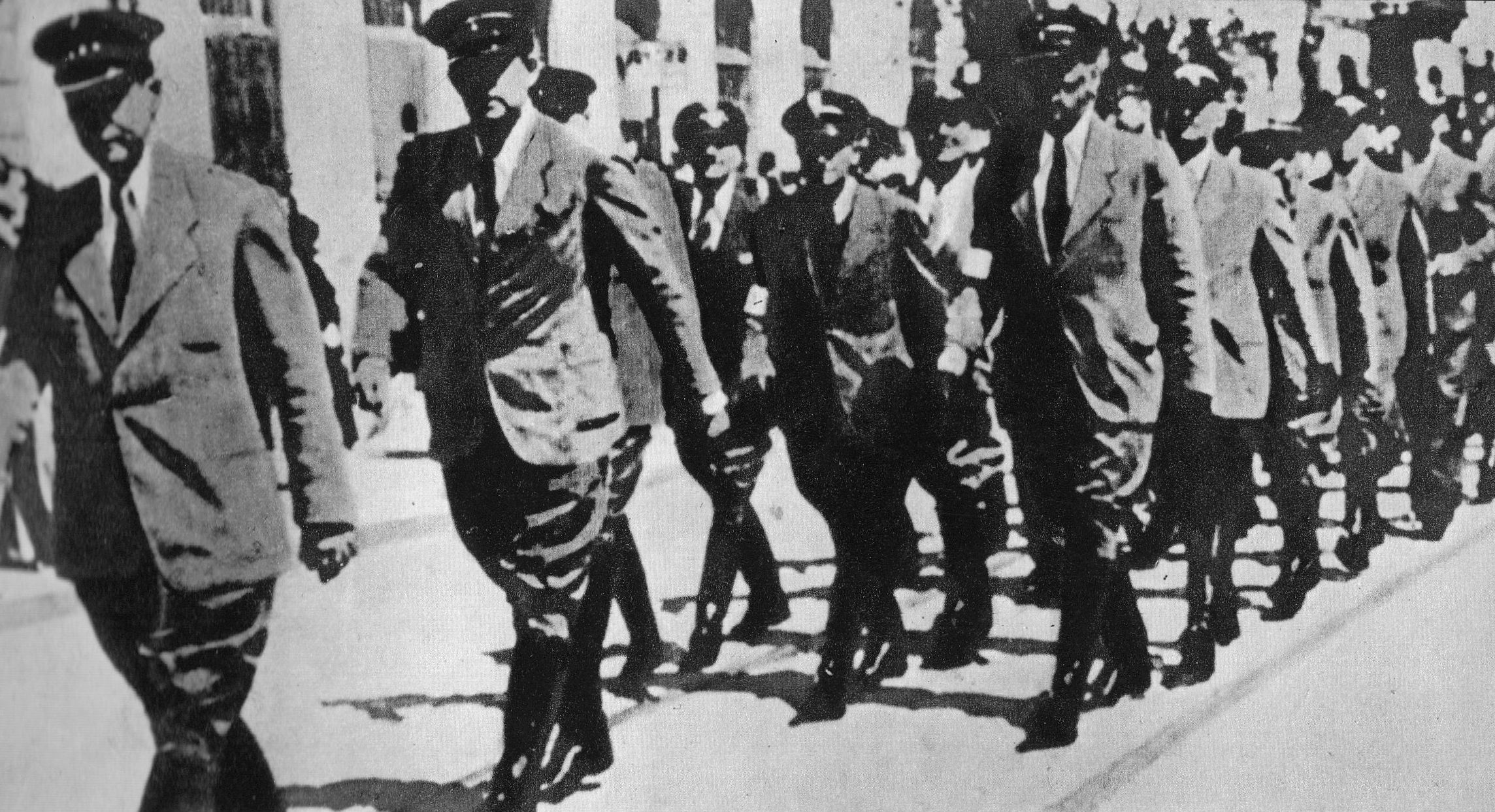
Employees of Trzynastka in the street

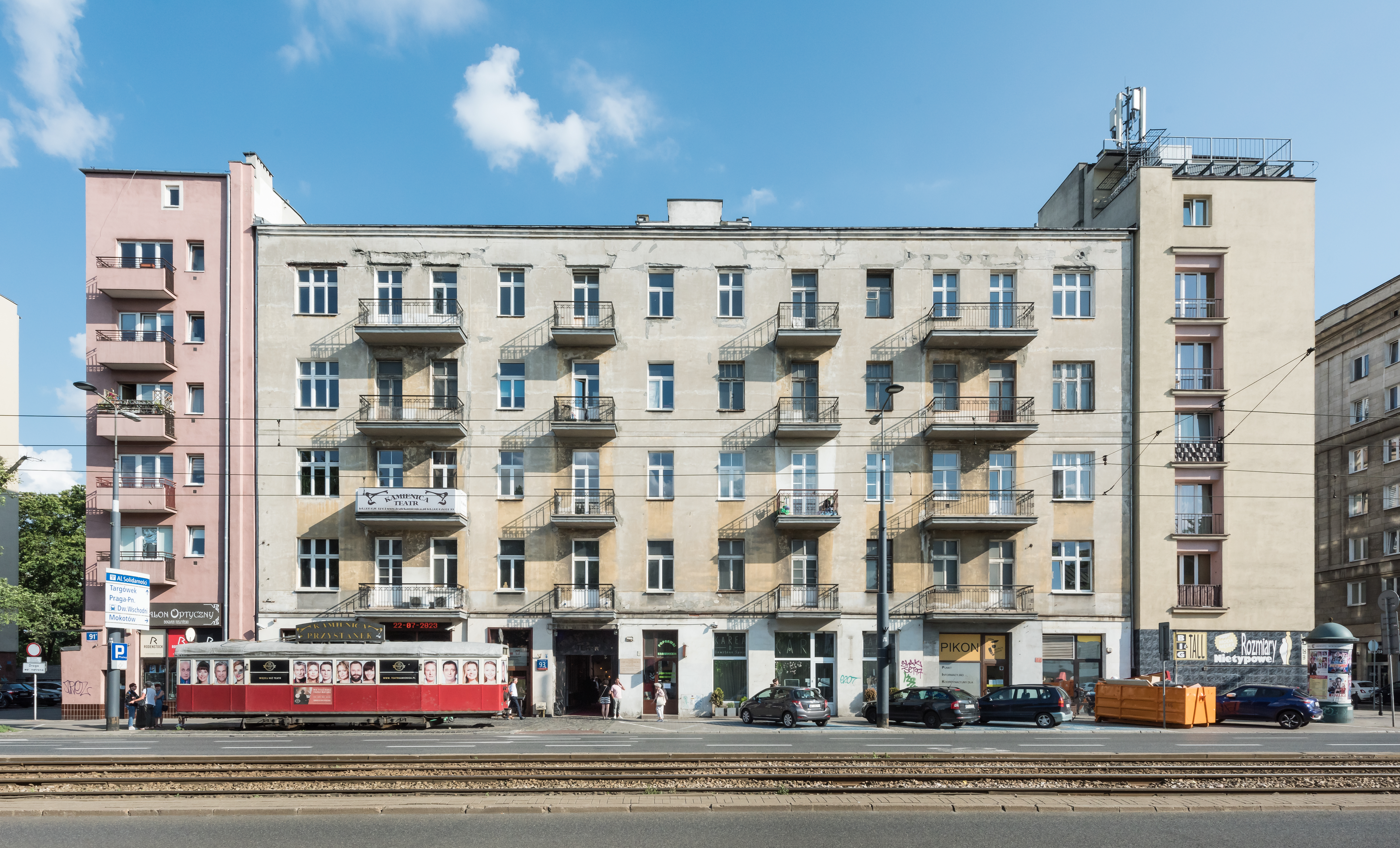
Building at 93 Solidarność Avenue, formerly 13 Leszno Street, in Warsaw, 2014, which was in 1940–1941 the HQ of Trzynastka

The Group 13 network (Polish: Trzynastka, Yiddish: דאָס דרײַצענטל) was a Jewish collaborationist organization in the Warsaw Ghetto during the German occupation of Poland in World War II. The rise and fall of the Group was likely a proxy for power struggles between various factions in the German military and bureaucracy, for their own financial benefit.

== Background ==
The group was founded in December 1940 and led by Abraham Gancwajch, the former head of Hashomer Hatzair in Łódź. The Thirteen took its informal name from the address of its main office at 13 Leszno Street in Warsaw. Sanctioned by Sicherheitsdienst (SD), and also known as the Jewish Gestapo, the unit reported directly to the local Gestapo office.

== Organizational structure ==
Group 13 had between 300 and 400 uniformed Jewish officers, distinguished by caps with green bands. Membership in the 13 required payment of several thousand zlotys, issued by the German Nazi-controlled bank. Although it was intended to curtail black market activity, the group actually extorted large sums of money through racketeering and blackmail. Its most important branch was the Office to Combat Usury and Profiteering. It also ran its own prison.

Group 13 vied for control of the Ghetto with the Judenrat, and infiltrated Jewish opposition within the Ghetto.

== Dissolution ==
In July 1941, Group 13 lost its political status to the Judenrat, and the Office to Combat Usury and Profiteering was taken over by the Jupo police force. Subsequently, the remaining members of Group 13 centered on Gancwajch, and concentrated their efforts on setting up their own infirmary and ambulance service (the so-called Emergency Service, or the First Aid Station), which was created in May 1941. The organization's purpose was quickly subverted, and its resources were used predominantly for smuggling and contraband. They ran other illegitimate operations, such as a brothel at the Britannica Hotel, and had near-total control over horse-drawn carriages and all other transportation within the Ghetto.

In April 1942, many former Group 13 members were executed in Operation Reinhard. In mid-1941, shortly before the Office was closed, there was a split in the Group leadership, when Morris Kohn and Zelig Heller broke with Gancwajch and established their own organizations. Kohn and Heller ultimately outlasted the Group. Their demise only came during the mass deportations of Jews from the Warsaw Ghetto to the Nazi Treblinka extermination camp in the course of Grossaktion Warsaw in July 1942, during which German Nazis murdered approximately 2,000,000 Polish Jews.

Gancwajch and surviving members of the group later re-emerged posing as Jewish underground fighters, though in reality they were hunting for Poles in hiding or supporting other Nazi collaborationists. After closing the Jewish Gestapo, Gancwajch remained in Warsaw, outside the Ghetto, where he continued working for the Nazis. He was rumored to have died in 1943; a hypothesis about his post-war collaboration with the NKVD was never confirmed.

== See also ==
- Żagiew, Polish Jewish group that was alleged by some to have collaborated with the Nazi government
- Stella Kübler, German Jewish Nazi collaborationist
- Chaim Rumkowski, Jewish head of the Judenrat of the Łódź Ghetto
- Jacob Gens, Jewish head of the Vilna Ghetto
- Ans van Dijk, Dutch Jewish Nazi collaborationist
- Moshe Merin, Jewish head of the Judenrat of the Sosnowiec Ghetto
- Jewish Ghetto Police, Jewish auxiliary police within the Nazi ghettos formed by local Judenrat
- Collaboration with the Axis Powers
