= Vladimir Tiomkin =

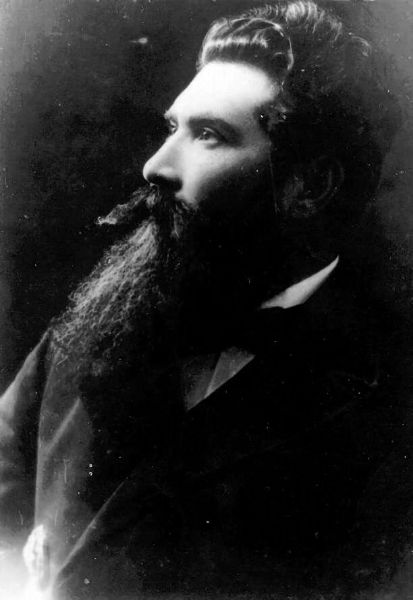
- Vladimir Tiomkin in 1897
- Born: 1861; Yelizavetgrad, Ukraine
- Died: 1927 (aged 65–66); Paris, France
- Other name: Ze'ev Tiomkin
- Known for: Zionist leader

Vladimir Tiomkin (also known as Ze'ev Tiomkin; 1861–1927) was a prominent Zionist leader in Russia, known for his extensive contributions to the Jewish national movement and his role in various Zionist organizations.
