= Jewish Ghetto Police =

Jewish auxiliary police units organized within the Nazi ghettos by local Judenrat

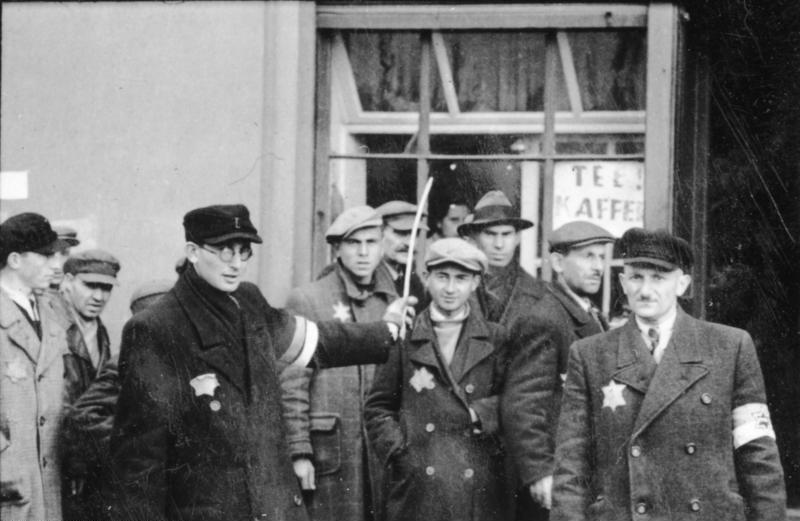
Jewish policemen in the Łódź Ghetto 1940

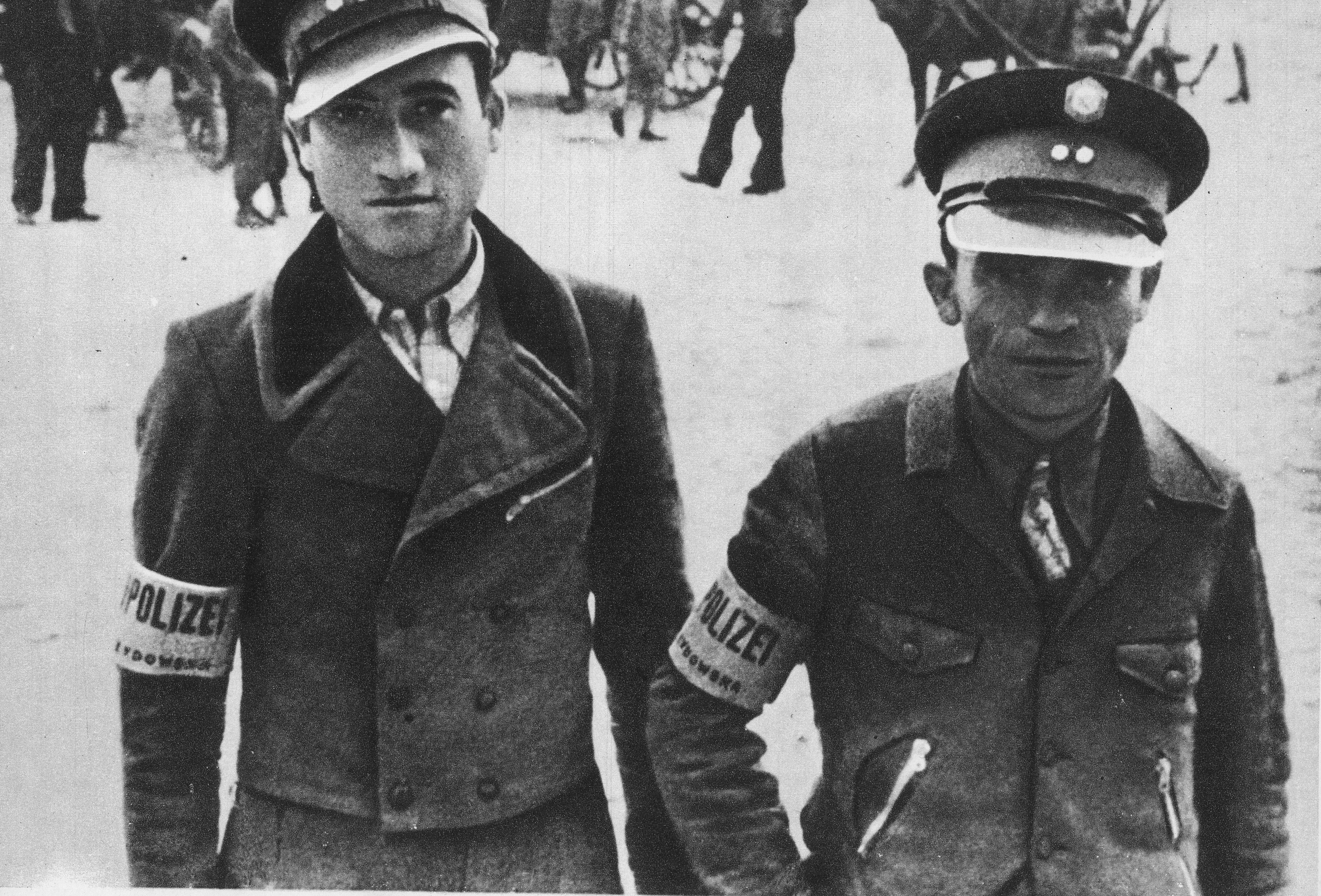
Jewish policemen in Węgrów Ghetto, Poland

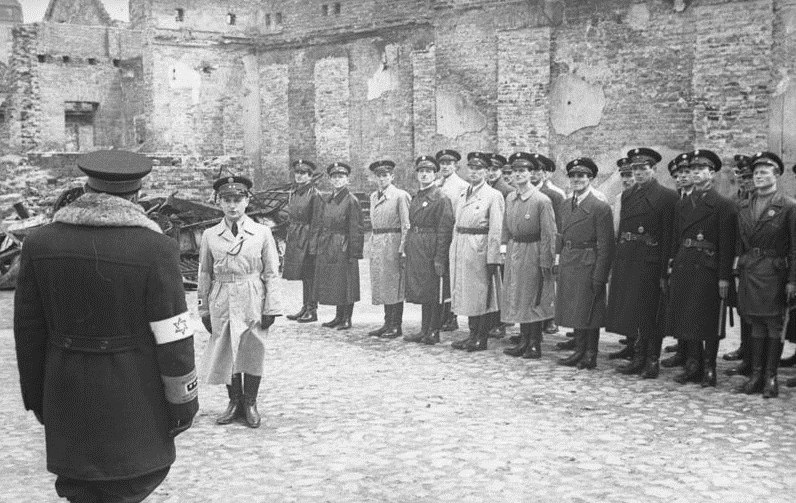
Jewish Ghetto Police in the Warsaw Ghetto, May 1941

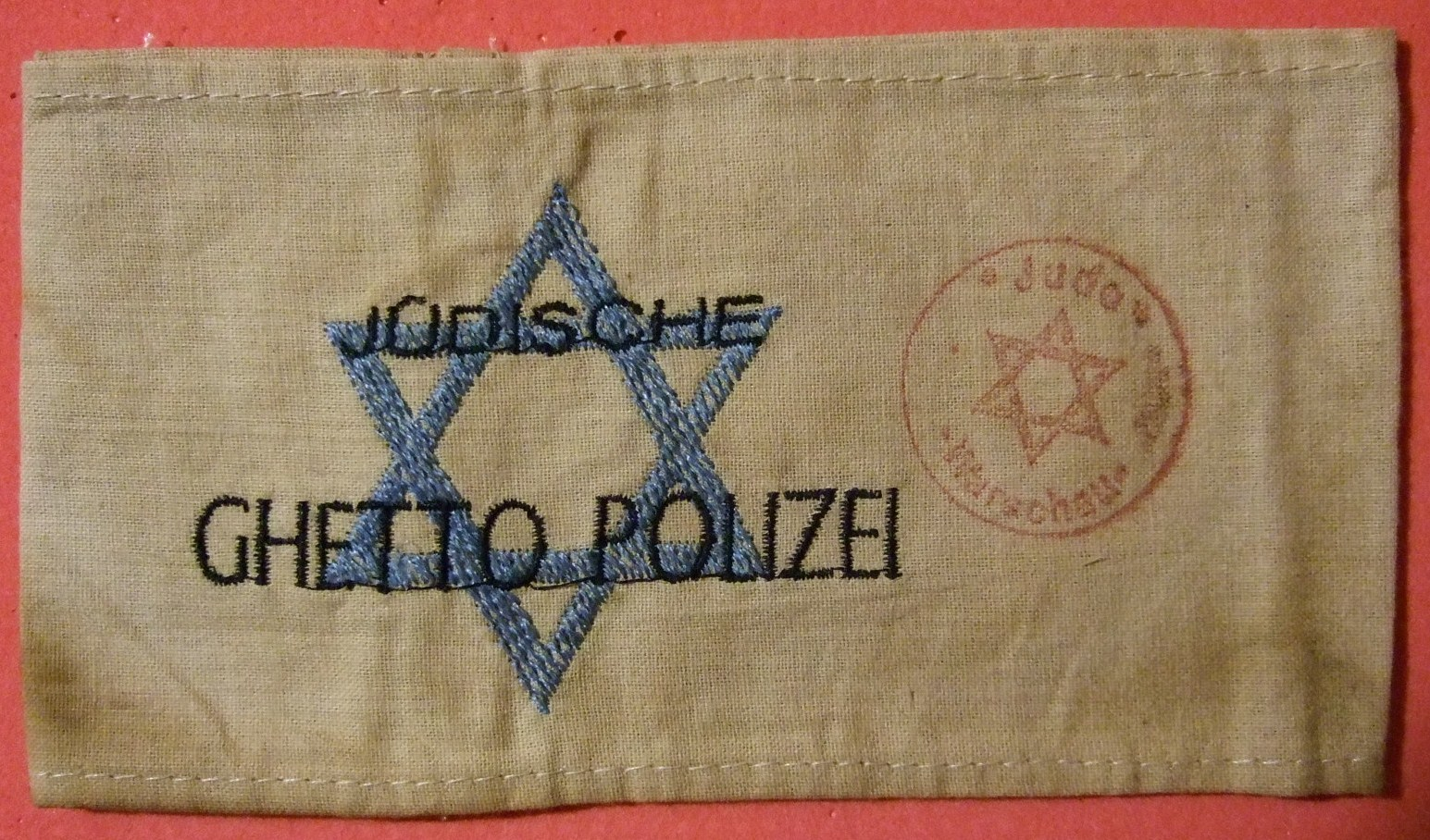
Armband worn by the Jewish Ghetto Police in the Warsaw Ghetto.

The Jewish Police Service (German: Jüdischer Ordnungsdienst), commonly known as Jewish Ghetto Police (German: Jüdische Ghetto-Polizei), also called the Jewish Police by Jews, were auxiliary police units organized within the Nazi ghettos by local Judenrat (Jewish councils).

== Overview ==
Members of the Jewish Police did not usually have official uniforms, often wearing just an identifying armband, a hat, and a badge, and were not allowed to carry firearms, although they did carry batons. In ghettos where the Judenrat was resistant to German orders, the Jewish police were often used (as reportedly in Lutsk) to control or replace the council. One of the largest Jewish police units was the unit in the Warsaw Ghetto, where the Jüdischer Ordnungsdienst numbered about 2,500. The Łódź Ghetto had about 1,200, and the Lwów Ghetto had 500.

Anatol Chari, a policeman in the Łódź Ghetto, in his memoirs describes his work protecting food depots, controlling bakery employees, as well as patrols aimed at the confiscation of food from the ghetto residents. He recounts the involvement of Jewish policemen in swindling food rations and in forcing women to provide sexual services in exchange for bread. The Polish-Jewish historian and Warsaw Ghetto archivist Emanuel Ringelblum has described the cruelty of the ghetto Jewish police as "at times greater than that of the Germans, the Ukrainians and the Latvians." The Jewish ghetto police ultimately shared the same fate with all their fellow ghetto inmates. On the ghettos' liquidation (1942–1943), they were either killed on-site or sent to extermination camps.

== See also ==
- Kapo
- Żagiew
- Group 13
- Kraków Ghetto Jewish Police
