= Hatzohar =

Hatzohar הצה״ר
- Leader: Ze'ev Jabotinsky; Menachem Begin; Aryeh Altman
- Founded: 1925
- Dissolved: 1949
- Merged into: Herut
- Newspaper: Hazit HaAm; HaYarden; HaMashkif
- Youth wing: Betar
- Paramilitary: Betar
- Membership (1934): 600,000
- Ideology: Revisionist Zionism; National liberalism
- Political position: Right-wing
- Colors: Blue
- Most MKs: 0

Election symbol

Hatzohar (Hebrew: הצה״ר), officially the Union of Revisionist Zionists (Hebrew: ברית הציונים הרוויזיוניסטים, lit. 'Brit HaTzionim HaRevizionistim'), was founded in 1925 to serve as the political arm of Ze'ev Jabotinsky's Revisionist Zionist movement. The organization, operating primarily in Mandatory Palestine and the European diaspora, was the primary challenger to the dominant leadership of the World Zionist Organization. It advocated for a more assertive and militant approach to the establishment of a Jewish state.

Following the establishment of Israel in 1948, the organization was succeeded by Menachem Begin's Herut party, into which it merged.

== History ==
Hatzohar was founded by Ze'ev Jabotinsky and others in Paris in April 1925. It followed the establishment of Jabotinsky's revisionist youth movement Betar in 1923. The initial nucleus of the movement consisted of a group of Russian Zionists who had supported Jabotinsky in establishing the Jewish Legion during World War I.

The photo of the First World Conference in Paris in 1925 shows 22 founding members. Aside from Jabotinsky, they included: M. Berchin-Benedictoff, Isidore Frankel, Meir Grossman, A. Ginsbourg, Aron Propes, Jacques Segal, Albert Stara, Ze'ev (Vladimir) Tiomkin, Zinovy Tiomkin, Israel Trivus, and Yehoshua Yeivin.

The name of 'revisionist' stems from the demands by these Zionists for a revision of the Zionist Organization's policies and its leadership under Chaim Weizmann, as well as the elected Jewish leadership in Palestine. They saw these policies as appeasement of British Government decisions in Mandatory Palestine.

In 1938, Tzohar began publishing the daily HaMashkif.

Polish members of the organisation were, among other things, instrumental in creating Żydowski Związek Wojskowy, one of two Jewish organisations that organised the Warsaw Ghetto Uprising.

At the time of Israel's independence in 1948, Hatzohar was the largest right-wing organization in the country, and had three seats in the Provisional State Council (held by Herzl Rosenblum, Zvi Segal and Ben-Zion Sternberg). However, the founding of Herut by Menachem Begin in the same year undermined its success. Although some purists alleged that Begin was out to steal Jabotinsky's mantle and refused to defect from the party, under the leadership of Aryeh Altman, Hatzohar won less than 1% of the vote in Israel's first elections and failed to cross the Knesset's electoral threshold. In contrast, Herut won 14 seats with 11.5% of the vote; Altman later joined Herut and was elected to the Knesset on its list in 1951, whilst Begin would carry Revisionist ideology of Likud to electoral victory in 1977.

The party was disbanded prior to the 1951 elections when it merged into Herut.

== Leaders ==
Leader		Took office	Left office
1	Ze'ev Jabotinsky	1925	1940
2	Menachem Begin	1940	1948
3	Aryeh Altman	1948	1949

== Election results ==
=== Assembly of Representatives (Mandatory Palestine) ===
Election	Leader	Votes	%	Place	Seats won
1925	Ze'ev Jabotinsky	—	—	4th	15 / 221
1931	Ze'ev Jabotinsky	8,069	16.3%	2nd	10 / 71
1944	Menachem Begin	Did not contest			—

=== Knesset ===
Election	Leader	Votes	%	Place	Seats won
1949	Aryeh Altman	2,892	0.7%	14th	0 / 120

== Gallery ==
First World Conference Hatzohar, Paris 1925

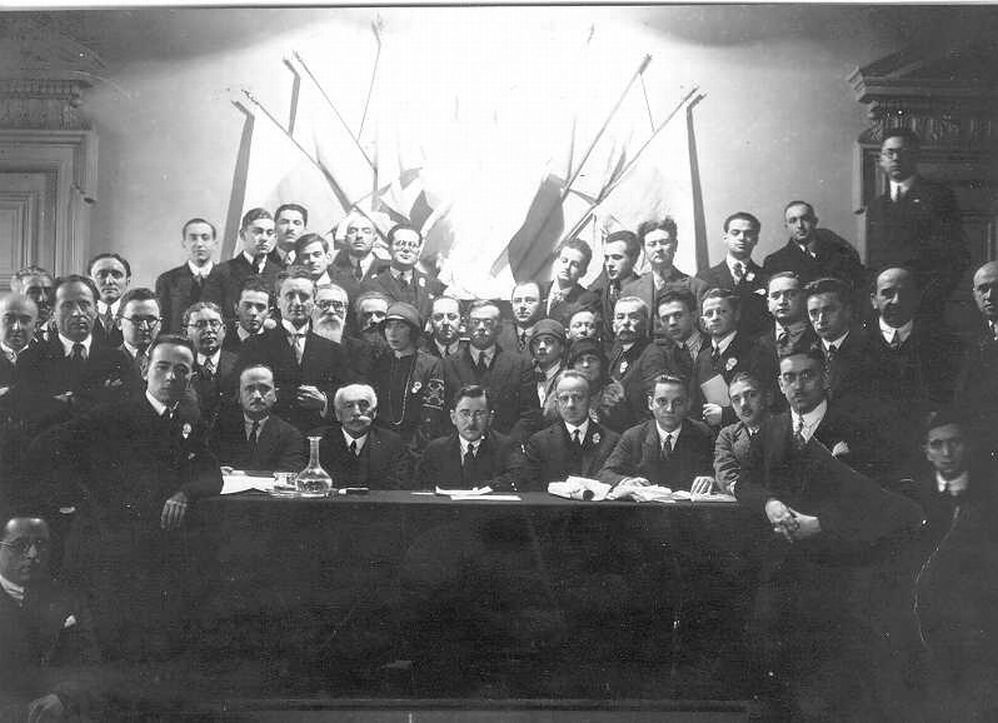
Ze'ev Jabotinsky at a Hatzohar Conference (likely in Paris, in the second half of the 1920s)

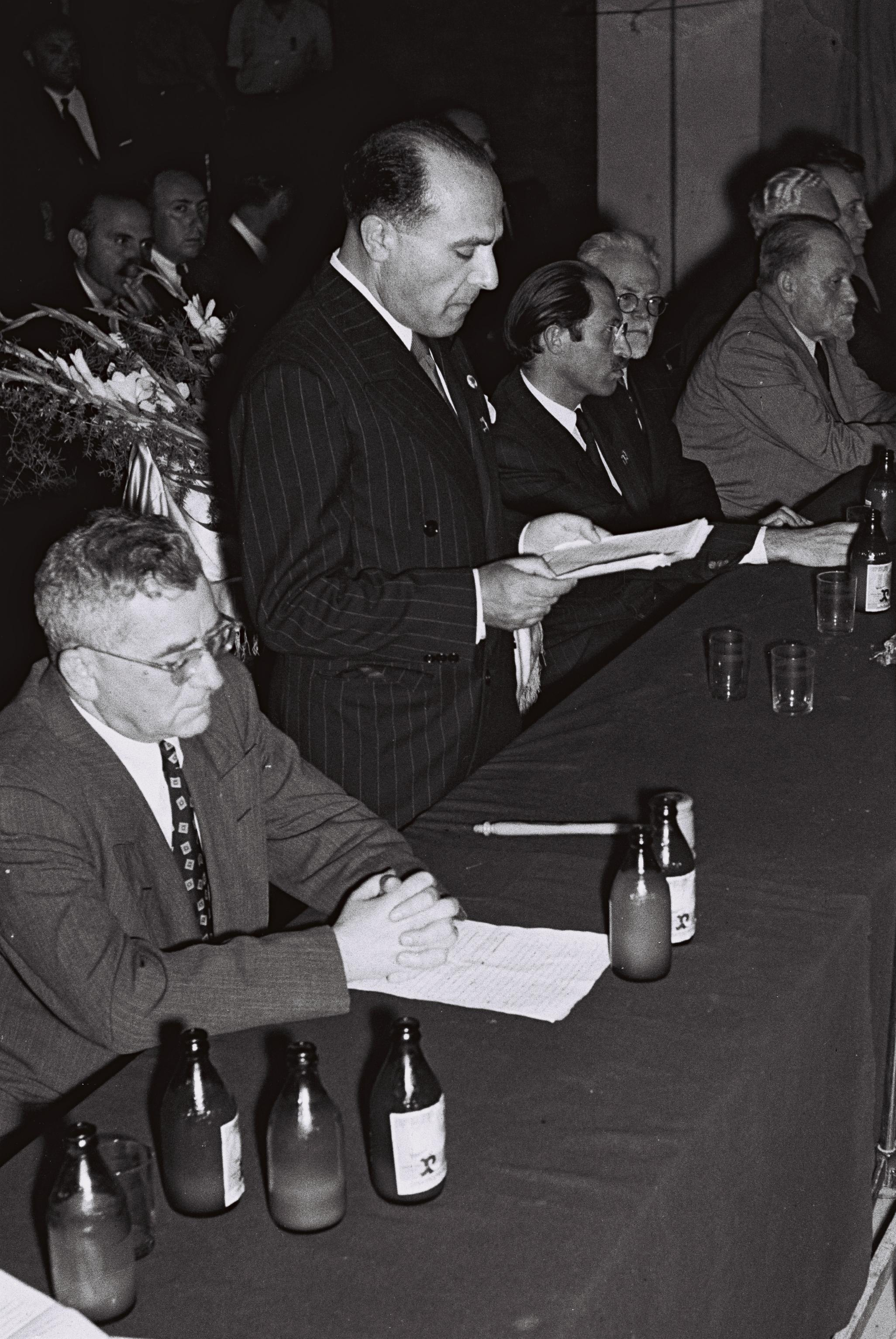
1949 convention of Hatzohar

== See also ==
- New Zionist Organization, the primary Revisionist organization from 1935 until 1946
- Politics of Israel
