= New Zionist Organization =

- הסתדרות ציונית חדשה
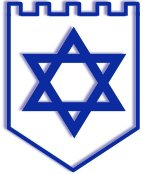
- Abbreviation: NZO (הצ״ח HaTzach)
- Formation: September 1935
- Dissolved: 1946
- Type: Revisionist Zionist political organization
- Founding leader: Ze'ev Jabotinsky

The New Zionist Organization (NZO; Hebrew: הסתדרות ציונית חדשה, abbreviated as הצ״ח HaTzach) was a Revisionist Zionist political organization established in 1935 by Ze'ev Jabotinsky as an alternative leadership to the Zionist Organization (ZO) following his faction's secession. Headquartered in London, the organization advocated for the immediate evacuation of European Jews to Mandatory Palestine, mass immigration, and the rapid establishment of a Jewish state on both sides of the Jordan River. Utilizing its own institutions, youth movements like Betar, and independent diplomatic lobbying, the organization functioned as a rival political body until it voted to reintegrate into the ZO in 1946.

== Establishment and Vienna Congress ==
The NZO was formally established at its founding convention, the First Constituent Assembly commonly known as the Vienna Congress, held in September 1935 at the Vienna Konzerthaus. The convention brought together 310 delegates representing 34 countries alongside thousands of youth movement members and supporters. Chaired by veteran Zionist leader Jacob de Haas, the congress elected Jabotinsky as its president (nasi).

== See also ==
- Hatzohar, the original Revisionist political arm
