= Abraham Gancwajch =

Jewish Nazi collaborator (1902–1943)

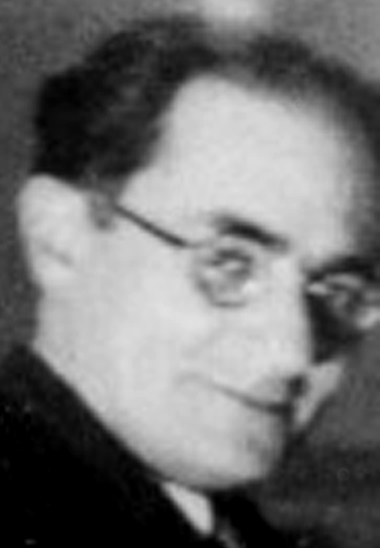
- Born: 1902; Częstochowa, Poland
- Died: 1943? (aged 40–41); Warsaw, Poland
- Occupation: Entrepreneur
- Known for: Being a Nazi collaborator in the Warsaw Ghetto

Abraham Gancwajch (1902–1943) was a prominent Nazi collaborator in the Warsaw Ghetto during the World War II occupation of Poland, and a Jewish kingpin of the ghetto underworld. Opinions about his ghetto activities are controversial, though modern research concludes unanimously that he was an informer and collaborator motivated chiefly by personal interest.

== Biography ==
Gancwajch was born in Częstochowa, Poland. As a youth, he apprenticed as a journalist and editor in Łódź, and eventually left Poland for Vienna, Austria, where he worked as a reporter on Jewish affairs for the Gerechtigkeit (Justice) periodical edited by Irena Harand. He was expelled from Vienna around 1936–1938 and returned to Poland, having gained his reputation as a teacher and a Zionist journalist with an oratorical skill.

After the German invasion of Poland, he surfaced in Warsaw as a refugee from Łódź, and as a person with connections to the German Sicherheitsdienst (SD). He first became a Nazi collaborator as a leader of the Hashomer Hatzair, delivering weekly intelligence reports to the Germans. In December 1940 he founded the Group 13 network, a Jewish Nazi collaborationist organization in the Warsaw Ghetto, described by Israel Gutman and Emanuel Ringelblum as the "Jewish Gestapo".

Gancwajch believed the Germans would win the war and called on Warsaw's Jews to serve them as a basic means of surviving. He preached collaboration with the German conquerors in a booklet which outraged Ghetto residents. He was also a proponent of the Nazi Madagascar Plan to create an autonomous settlement for all Jews under the protection of the Third Reich in an overseas country. Adam Czerniaków, whom Gancwajch attempted to usurp as head of the Judenrat, mentioned him in his diary as "a despicable, ugly creature". Janusz Korczak, who ran an orphanage in the Ghetto, when asked why he was dealing with him, replied, "I will see the devil himself to save my children."

== Final events and disappearance ==
In the Warsaw Ghetto Gancwajch lived a lavish life, collecting hefty sums from others by various means. On the other hand, he helped the poor and artists. But all his initiatives became corrupted; for example, he set up a hospital with ambulances, but the network soon came to be used primarily for smuggling by Group 13, a racketeering network that was officially to have combated black-marketeering in the Ghetto. After most of the Group 13 was eliminated by the Germans in 1943, Gancwajch reemerged outside the ghetto on the Aryan side in Warsaw, where he and other members of his group, pretending to be Jewish underground fighters, were hunting for Poles hiding or otherwise supporting the Jews. He is also known to have tried to sabotage attempts at the Warsaw Ghetto Uprising. The Jewish Combat Organization sentenced him to death, but were never able to execute him. His ultimate fate remains unknown.

== See also ==
- Collaboration in German-occupied Poland
- List of people who disappeared
