= Revisionist Zionism =

Right-leaning faction of the Zionist movement

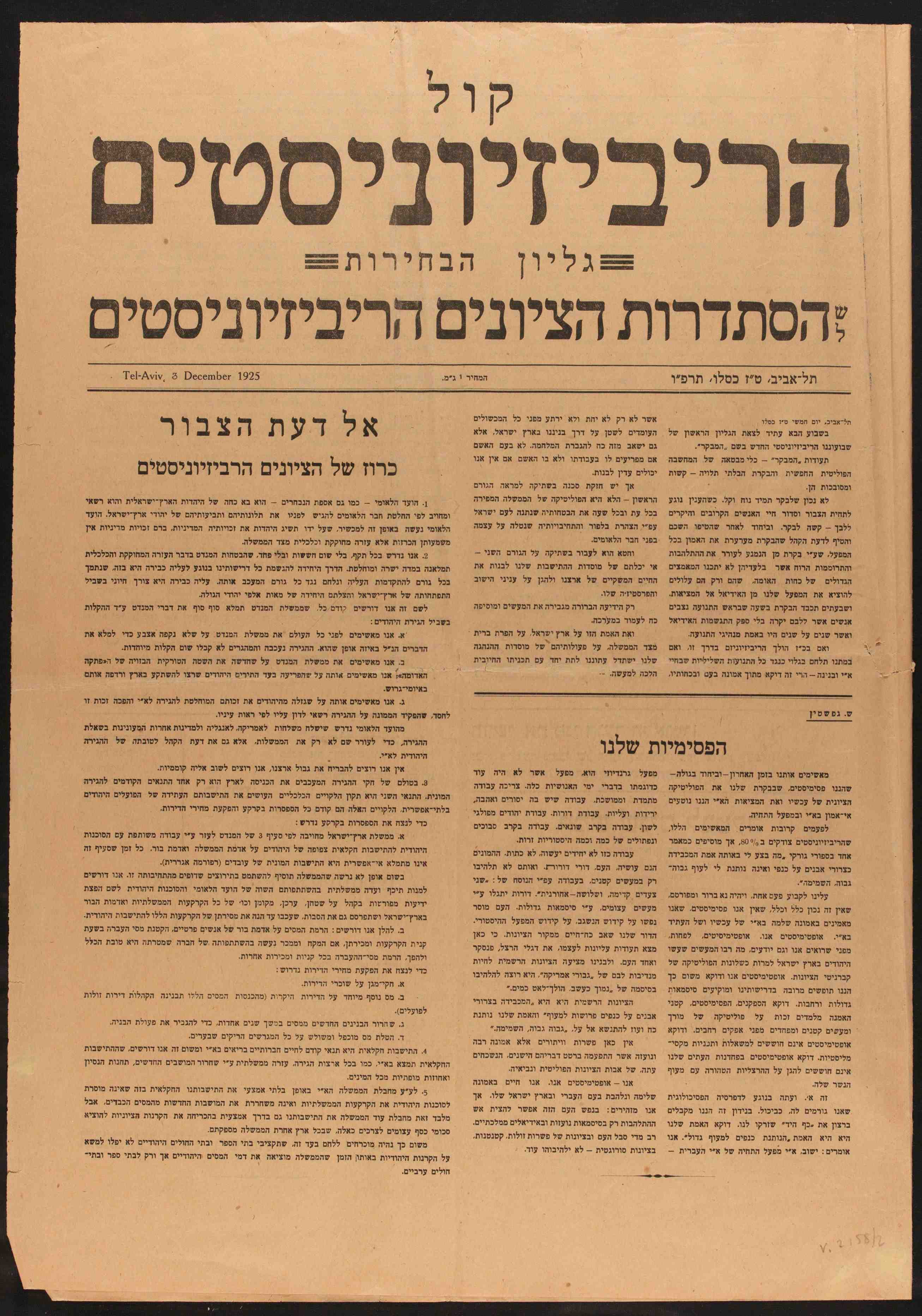
1925 election manifesto of the Union of Revisionist Zionists

Revisionist Zionism (Hebrew: ציונות רוויזיוניסטית, romanized: Ṣiyyônût Revîzyônîstît) is a form of Zionism characterized by territorial maximalism. Revisionist Zionism promoted expansionism and the establishment of a Jewish majority on both sides of the Jordan River. Developed by Ze'ev Jabotinsky in the 1920s, Revisionism advocated a "revision" of the "practical Zionism" of David Ben-Gurion and Chaim Weizmann, which was focused on the settling of Eretz Yisrael (ארץ ישראל, '[the] Land of Israel') by independent Jewish individuals. Differing from other types of Zionism, Revisionists insisted upon the Jewish right to sovereignty over the whole of Eretz Yisrael, including Mandatory Palestine and Transjordan. It was the main ideological opponent to the dominant labor–socialist Labor Zionism. Revisionist Zionism has strongly influenced modern right-wing Israeli parties, principally Herut and its successor, Likud.

To advance this agenda, Jabotinsky formally established the Union of Revisionist Zionists (Hatzohar) in 1925 as the official political arm of the movement. In 1935, after the Zionist Executive rejected Jabotinsky's political program, Jabotinsky resigned from the World Zionist Organization and founded the New Zionist Organization (NZO; הסתדרות הציונית החדשה, Histadrut HaTzionit HaChadasha), known in Hebrew as Tzakh (צח). It aimed to conduct independent political activity for free immigration and the establishment of a Jewish state. In its early years under Jabotinsky's leadership, Revisionist Zionism was focused on gaining support from Britain for settlement. From the early 1930s, Jabotinsky believed that the United Kingdom could no longer be trusted to advance the Zionist cause, leading to a short-lived alliance with Fascist Italy.

Revisionist Zionism had its own paramilitary group, led by Jabotinsky, until he died in 1940, called the Irgun (shorthand for הָאִרְגּוּן הַצְּבָאִי הַלְּאֻמִּי, ha‑ʾirgūn ha‑tsvaʾi ha‑leʾumi, 'The National Military Organization'), which some have characterized as a terrorist organization. Both the Irgun and the Stern Gang that emerged from it were responsible for several attacks against the British to try to expel them from Palestine. After the White Paper of 1939 severely limited Jewish immigration to Palestine, just as the Nazis were gaining power, the Irgun and Lehi (לֶחִי, Leḥi) initiated campaigns against the British.

After the founding of Israel, control of the East Bank became increasingly less important in the ideology of Revisionist Zionism. Following the 1967 Six-Day War, when Israel occupied the West Bank and the Gaza Strip, Revisionism's territorial aspirations concentrated on these territories instead. By the 1970s, the legitimacy of the Hashemite Kingdom of Jordan was no longer questioned and in 1994, an overwhelming majority of Likud Knesset Members (MKs) voted for the Israel–Jordan Treaty of Peace.

== History ==
=== Early history of Revisionist Zionism ===
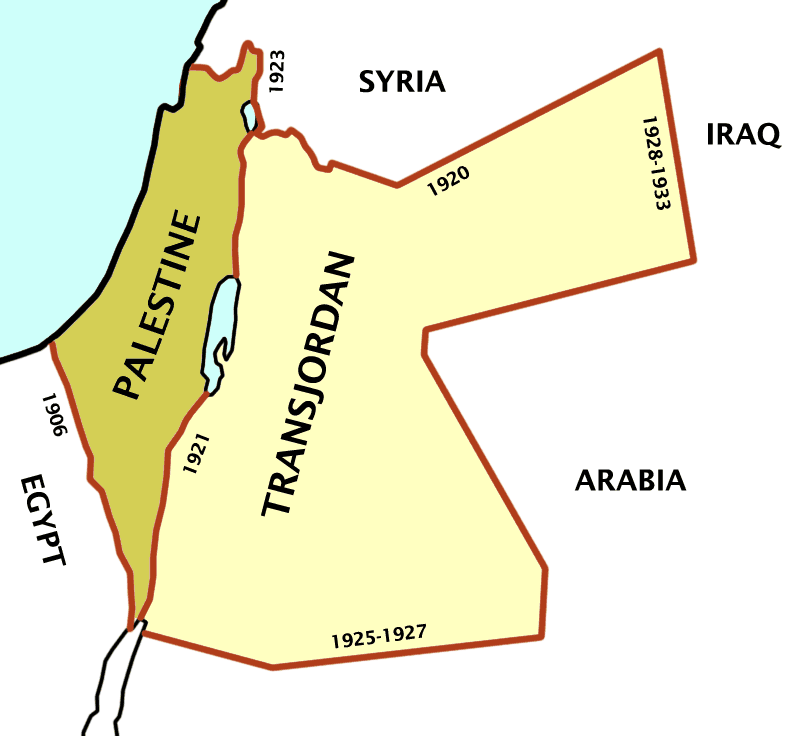
The British included Transjordan within the borders of the British Mandate for Palestine, at the same time excluding it from Jewish settlement.

Revisionist Zionism was based on a vision of "political Zionism", which Jabotinsky regarded as following the legacy of Theodor Herzl, the founder of modern political Zionism. His main demand was the creation of Greater Israel on both sides of the Jordan River, and was against partitioning Palestine with the Arabs, as suggested by the Peel Commission.

The 1921 British establishment of Transjordan (the modern-day state of Jordan) adversely affected this goal and was a major setback for the movement. Before Israel achieved statehood in 1948, Revisionist Zionism became known for its advocacy of more belligerent, assertive postures and actions against both British and Arab control of the region.

Criticism of the Churchill White Paper of 1922 sparked the establishment of the Revisionist Union. The central committee of the Revisionist Union defined its relationship with Great Britain as one of mutual loyalty but it was at odds with the mandatory administration. In the 1920s, Revisionist leadership wanted clearly to define the relationship of the Revisionist movement and the British Empire. It supported the proposal of British MP Josiah Wedgewood to make Palestine a Seventh Dominion of the British Empire. The proposal was ratified at the third Revisionist world conference which took place from 26 December 1928, to 30 December 1928. A year later, the proposal was approved by the executive committee as part of its working plan.

Jabotinsky established the Revisionist Party in 1925 with the intention of replacing the General Zionists. The 1929 riots by Arabs in Palestine led to the radicalization of the Zionist movement. This led to the dwindling of the General Zionist movement and the struggle for leadership in the 1931 elections to the 17th Zionist Congress between Revisionist Zionists and Labor Zionists. In the 1929 elections to the 16th Congress, the Revisionists won only 7% of the votes, but in the 1931 elections, they won 21% of the votes.

In 1931, Jabotinsky forced Chaim Weizmann to resign as president of the World Zionist Organization. Jabotinsky wanted to establish Revisionist Zionism as a separate movement that existed independent from the general Zionist movement. However, Revisionist delegates would not join Jabotinsky in announcing immediate secession from the Zionist movement. Supporters of Jabotinsky's idea to secede were Abba Ahimeir, Uri Zvi Greenberg, and Zeev von Weisel. Jabotinsky created a political platform called 'The Ultimate Objective' which demanded that Congress proclaim that the ultimate objective of Zionism was the establishment of a Jewish state that had a Jewish majority on both sides of the Jordan River. If the Congress accepted the platform, that would indicate that it supported Revisionist ideas and leadership. If it did not accept the platform, the Revisionists would secede. Ultimately, the platform was rejected after a cable was sent from Palestine by Eliyahu Golomb and Saadia Shoshani. The cable said that acceptance of the platform would lead to an Arab pogrom in Palestine. In response to the rejection of the platform, Jabotinsky tore up his membership card.

The debate over secession continued for two years until shortly before the elections for the 18th Congress in 1933. In March 1933, three months before the elections, Jabotinsky suspended the activities of all party institutions and deposed all central party functionaries. He also appointed himself sole leader of the Revisionist movement.

In 1935, the Revisionists seceded from the World Zionist Organization because it refused to declare the establishment of a Jewish state as its immediate aim. The Revisionists formed the New Zionist Organization and elected Jabotinsky as its president. The Revisionist movement was threatened with bankruptcy in 1936 when Jabotinsky moved his headquarters from Paris to London.

The Revisionists opposed the World Zionist Organization's attempts to negotiate the Haavara trade agreement with Hitler. Jabotinsky attempted to get a motion passed to support an anti-Nazi boycott which was defeated 249 to 43. After this, Jabotinsky attempted to set up the Revisionist World Union as a boycott center, but this was also unsuccessful.

There were 10 Revisionist Zionist youth groups in Warsaw, Poland, one of which was Betar. Jabotinsky became head of Betar in 1929, but the actual organization was founded by Aron Propes in 1923. Menachem Begin joined Betar in 1929 in Poland and was head of the national unit, which was the largest branch of Betar in the world. Socialist Zionist youth movements in Poland warned of the rise of fascism in Poland in reference to the activities of Betar. Chaim Weizmann, the president of the World Zionist organization, referred to Betar's connection with Italian fascism. In November 1934, Benito Mussolini organized a Betar squadron at Civitavecchia where 134 cadets were trained by the Blackshirts. Their training was ended in 1937 after Mussolini aligned himself with Hitler. One of the main messages of Betar was that Jews would only be able to survive if they fought back against violence or even struck first through violent means. Betar members defended Poland during the German invasion in 1939. In Sosnoweic, Betar members joined Catholic Polish youth in a civilian defense battalion. In Sanok, Betar members set up bomb shelters and dug trenches. In Bursztyn, Betar members joined a self-defense unit that was organized by Catholic Poles to defend against the possibility of a Ukrainian invasion into Polish territory. Jabotinsky and Menachem Begin both expressed solidarity with Poland following the German invasion. However, almost all of Betar's national leadership in Warsaw fled Poland because of rumors that German troops were executing Polish and Jewish political activists. Begin also fled Poland and proposed to a Polish officer that a Jewish brigade should be established within the Polish army to defend against a German attack. Many of the activists who had fled Poland returned to organize underground activity to resist the German troops occupying the country.

In October 1937, Jabotinsky met with Marshall Edward Smigly-Rydz to arrange an alliance between Revisionist Zionists and the anti-semitic Polish regime. Jabotinsky used the Polish press to call for the evacuation of 1.5 million Jews from eastern Europe, mostly from Poland. In spring 1939, Poles set up a guerrilla training school for Revisionist Zionists at Zakopane in the Tatra Mountains. 25 members of the Irgun were brought to Poland from Palestine and were taught sabotage and insurrection by the Polish Army. The Polish Army also provided weapons for 10,000 men for a possible invasion of Palestine in April 1940. In August 1939, Menachem Begin told the Irgun that he wanted the invasion to take place in October 1939. He planned to lead the Betar, who would land on the beach at Tel Aviv, and the Irgun would occupy the Government House in Jerusalem, hold it for 24 hours, and declare a provisional government. After Jabotinsky died or was arrested, Revisionists in Europe and America would proclaim a government-in-exile. Jabotinsky changed the invasion plan after the 1939 White Paper. Britain restricted Zionist land purchases, limited immigration to 75,000 for the next five years, and suggested an Arab-dominated state be formed in the next 10 years.

After the German invasion of Poland in 1939, Jabotinsky focused on creating another Jewish Legion. The only place where he could recruit people to join this organization was the United States, and he did not arrive there until March 1940. He also attempted to convince British politicians to help him recruit this army, but they did not agree to do so. The British believed that they had Jewish support in their war against Nazi Germany, and they believed that the creation of another Jewish Legion would create tension in the Middle East.

=== History of Revisionist Zionism after Israel's establishment ===
During the first two decades after the Israeli Declaration of Independence in May 1948, the main revisionist party, Herut (founded in June 1948), remained in opposition. The party slowly began to revise its ideology in an effort to change this situation and to gain political power. While Begin maintained the Revisionist claim to Jewish sovereignty over all of Eretz Israel, by the late 1950s, control over the East Bank of the Jordan ceased to be integral to Revisionist ideology. Following Herut's merger with the Liberal Party in 1965, references to the ideal of Jewish sovereignty over "both banks of the Jordan" became less frequent. By the 1970s, the legitimacy of the Hashemite Kingdom of Jordan was no longer questioned. In 1994, the complete practical abandonment of the "both banks" principle was apparent when an overwhelming majority of Likud Knesset Members (MKs) voted in favour of the Israel–Jordan Treaty of Peace.

The Herut party in 1948 won 14 seats in the 1949 elections. The official Revisionist party did not win any seats in the 1949 elections and would merge with Herut in 1950. In 1965, Herut became Gahal after merging with the Liberal Party. Gahal joined the government for the first time in 1967, and Menachem Begin became minister without portfolio in Levi Eshkol's government. In July 1970, Begin and his colleagues left the National Unity Government under Golda Meir as a protest against the Rogers Peace Plan.

Gahal would become Likud in 1973 after merging with three nationalist splinter groups. In 1977, Menachem Begin and Likud took power in Israel, with Begin becoming Israel's prime minister.

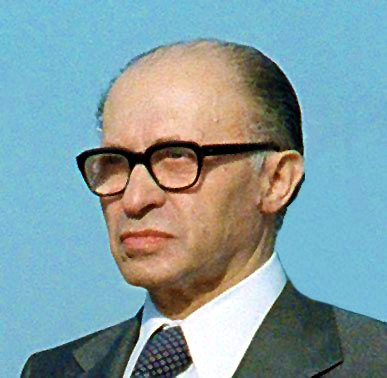
Menachem Begin, member of the Irgun, founder of the Herut party, and former Prime Minister of Israel as a member of Likud

Following Israel's capture of the West Bank and the Gaza Strip in the 1967 Six-Day War, Revisionism's territorial aspirations concentrated on these territories. These areas were far more central to ancient Jewish history than the East Bank of the Jordan and most of the areas within Israel's post-1949 borders. In 1968, Begin defined the "eternal patrimony of our ancestors" as "Jerusalem, Hebron, Bethlehem, Judea, [and] Shechem [Nablus]" in the West Bank. In 1973, Herut's election platform called for the annexation of the West Bank and Gaza. When Menachem Begin became leader of the broad Likud coalition (1973) and soon afterwards Prime Minister (in office: 1977–1983), he considerably modified Herut's expansive territorial aims. The party's aspiration to unite all of Mandatory Palestine under Jewish rule was scaled down. Instead, Begin spoke of the historic unity of Israel in the West Bank, even hinting that he would make territorial concessions in the Sinai as part of a complete peace settlement.

When Begin finally came to power in the 1977 election, his overriding concern as Prime Minister (1977–1983) was to maintain Israeli control over the West Bank and Gaza.

In 1983, following criticism of the Israeli war in Lebanon in 1982 and the Sabra and Shatila massacre carried out by Israel's Lebanese Christian allies, Begin resigned as prime minister of Israel. Begin was replaced by Yitzhak Shamir, who was also a member of Likud, in 1983. Another member of Likud, Benjamin Netanyahu, came from a family of Revisionist Zionists. He was elected prime minister of Israel in 1996.

== Jabotinsky and Revisionist Zionism ==
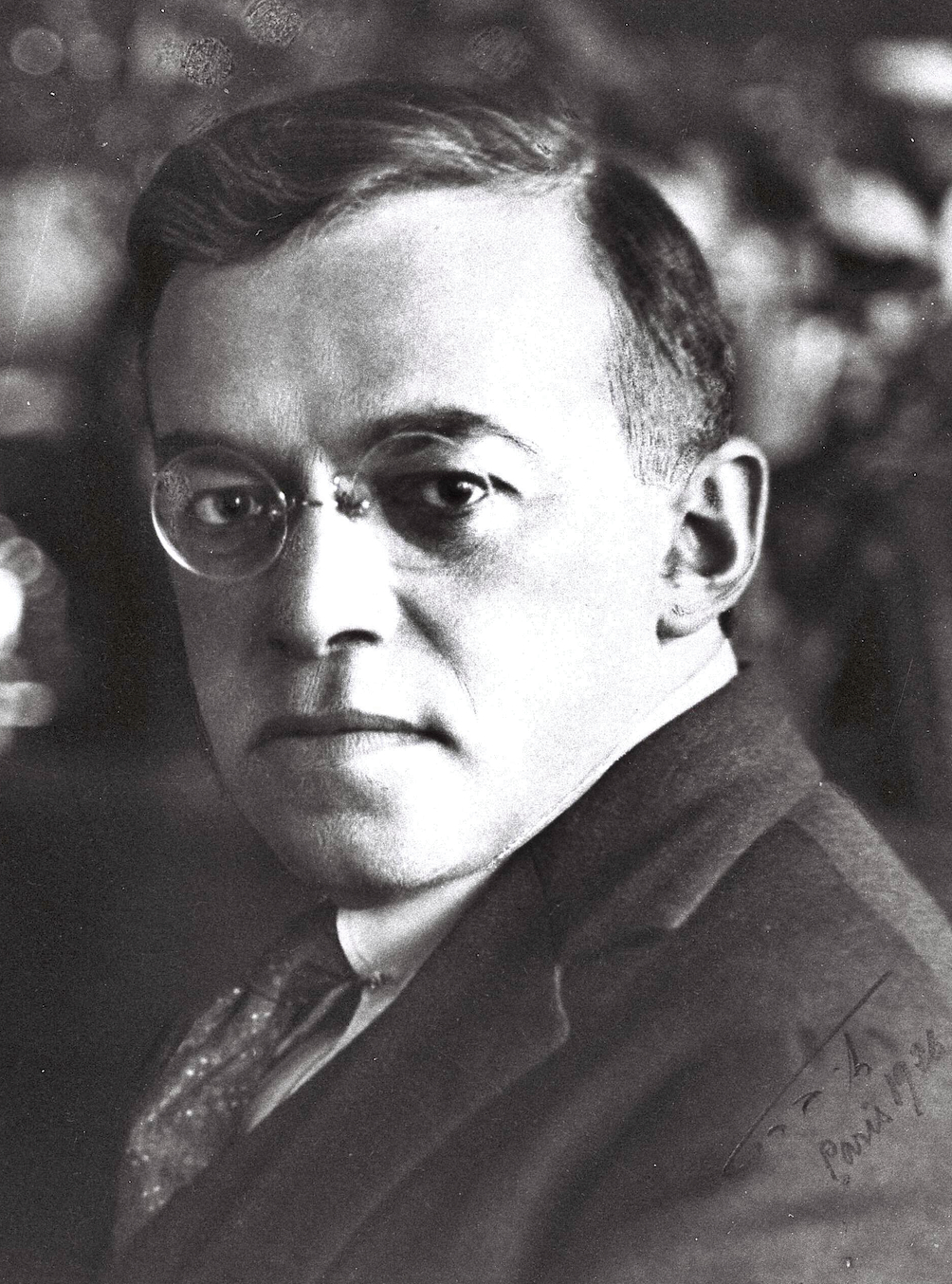
Ze'ev Jabotinsky, founder of Revisionist Zionism

After World War I, Jabotinsky was elected to the first legislative assembly in the Yishuv, and in 1921 he was elected to the Executive Council of the Zionist Organization (known as the World Zionist Organization after 1960). He quit the latter group in 1923, thanks mainly to differences of opinion with its chairman, Chaim Weizmann. In 1925, Jabotinsky formed the Hatzohar, the Union of Revisionist Zionists, in the World Zionist Congress to advocate his views, which included increased cooperation with Britain on transforming the entire Mandate for Palestine territory, including Palestine itself and Transjordan, on opposite sides of the Jordan River, into a sovereign Jewish state, loyal to the British Empire. To this end, Jabotinsky advocated for mass Jewish immigration from Europe and the creation of a second Jewish Legion to guard a nascent Jewish state at inception. Jabotinsky wished to convince Britain that a Jewish state would be in the best interest of the British Empire, perhaps even an autonomous extension of it in the Middle East.

When, in 1935, the Zionist Organization failed to accept Jabotinsky's program, he and his followers seceded to form the New Zionist Organization. The NZO rejoined the ZO in 1946. The Zionist Organization was roughly composed of General Zionists, who were in the majority, followers of Jabotinsky, who came in a close second, and Labour Zionists, led by David Ben-Gurion, who comprised a minority yet had much influence where it mattered, in the Yishuv.

Despite its strong representation in the Zionist Organization, Revisionist Zionism had a small presence in the Yishuv, in contrast to Labour Zionism, which was dominant among kibbutzim and workers, and hence the settlement enterprise. General Zionism was dominant among the middle class, which later aligned itself with the Revisionists. In the Jewish Diaspora, Revisionism was most established in Poland, where its base of operations was organized in various political parties and Zionist Youth groups, such as Betar. By the late 1930s, Revisionist Zionism was divided into three distinct ideological streams: the "Centrists", the Irgun, and the "Messianists".

Jabotinsky later argued for establishing a base in the Yishuv and developed a vision to guide the Revisionist movement and the new Jewish society on economic and social policy centered around the ideal of the Jewish middle class in Europe. Jabotinsky believed that basing the movement on a philosophy contrasting with the socialist-oriented Labour Zionists would attract the support of the General Zionists.

In line with this thinking, the Revisionists transplanted into the Yishuv a youth movement, Betar. They also set up a paramilitary group, Irgun, a labour union, the National Labor Federation in Eretz-Israel, and health services. The latter were intended to counteract the increasing hegemony of Labour Zionism over community services via the Histadrut and address the Histadrut's refusal to make its services available to Revisionist Party members.

== Irgun Tsvai Leumi ==
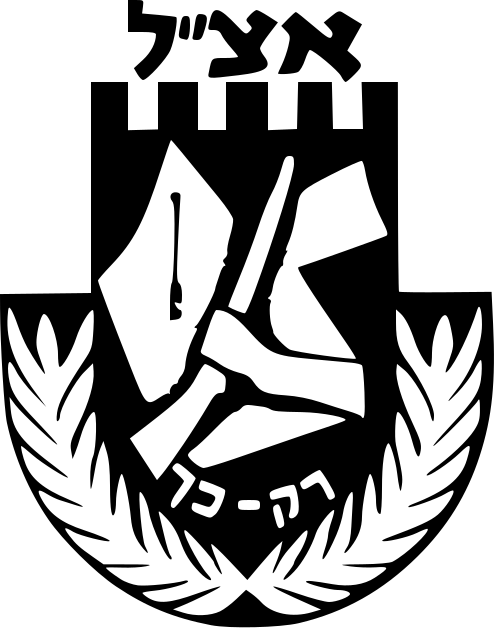
The emblem of the Irgun

The paramilitary organization of the Revisionist movement was called the National Military Organization, or the Irgun. The Irgun (short for Irgun Tsvai Leumi, Hebrew for "National Military Organization" ארגון צבאי לאומי) had its roots initially in the Betar youth movement in Poland, which Jabotinsky founded. By the 1940s, they had transplanted many of its members from Europe and the United States to Palestine.

The Revisionists split from the Haganah in 1931 because they opposed its domination by the Histadrut. They formed the "Haganah-B" which was commanded by a Revisionist Zionist, Abraham Tehomi. "Haganah B" was founded by Avraham Tehomi in 1931. Tehomi led "Haganah-B" until December 1936 when he agreed to give the leadership position to Jabotinsky. The group did not became completely Revisionist until April 1937 when Tehomi and about a quarter of the 3,000 men in "Haganah-B" returned to the Haganah due to their support for the Mizrachi, General Zionists, and Jewish State Party. "Haganah B" was transformed into the Irgun after Tehomi split from the group to join the Haganah. Jabotinsky initially adopted the Haganah's doctrine of self-restraint because he wanted a legal legion that was formally affiliated with the military and he thought that an illegal counterinsurgency would make that impossible. However, once "Haganah B" became the Irgun, the organization became an independent underground organization.

The Irgun carried out a number of attacks against the British and Arabs. In September 1937, the Irgun killed 13 Arabs which was said to be in retaliation for the deaths of three Jews. The summer of 1938 was the high point of the Irgun's campaign. On 6 July 1938, the Irgun set off a bomb in a milk can in the Arab market in Haifa which killed 21 and injured 52. On 15 July 1938, an electric mine in David Street in Jerusalem killed 10 and injured 30. On 25 July 1938, the Irgun set off another bomb in the Arab market in Haifa which killed 35 and wounded 70. On 26 August 1938, the Irgun set off a bomb in the market in Jaffa which killed 24 and injured 35.

In response to the White Paper in 1939, the Irgun bombed British facilities. The British responded by arresting Irgun commander David Raziel in May. In addition, on 31 August 1939, the rest of the Irgun high command was apprehended while discussing Jabotinsky's plan to invade Palestine.

The Irgun was commanded by Jabotinsky until his death in 1940. Menachem Begin commanded the Irgun from 1943 until the organization was dissolved in June 1948. In 1939, the Irgun called off their campaign against the British mandatory authorities for the duration of World War Two as the British fought against the Axis powers with the other Allied powers.

Acting often in conflict (but at times, also in coordination) with rival clandestine militias such as the Haganah and the Lehi (or Stern Group), the Irgun's efforts would feature prominently in the armed struggles against British and Arab forces alike in the 1930s and 1940s, and ultimately become decisive in the closing events of the 1948 Arab–Israeli War.

=== Lehi ===
Lehi, Fighters for the Freedom of Israel, and known pejoratively as the Stern Gang, was formed in 1940 by Avraham Stern as a small, radical splinter group from the Irgun. While the Irgun and the Revisionist party agreed to a ceasefire with Great Britain to support the Allied fight against Nazi Germany, Lehi viewed the British as the primary enemy and sought anti-British alliances, including with the Axis powers. The group employed terrorism and political assassinations to try to expel the British from Palestine. Following the 1948 dissolution of the group, many former Lehi members and leaders, including future Likud Prime Minister Yitzhak Shamir, reintegrated into mainstream Revisionist successor parties like Herut.

== Ideology ==
=== Ideology of pre-state Revisionist Zionism ===
The Revisionist Zionist movement did not have a clearly defined ideology which was more of a feature of Zionists on the left. Initially, the stance of the movement was to reject the policies of the contemporary Zionist leadership under Chaim Weizmann. The lack of a coherent ideology was something the movement took pride in since it removed them from the brand of traditional party politics and did not emphasize identification with religion or social class. However, despite the lack of a clear ideology, one clear belief of the original Revisionist leadership was the need to create a Jewish majority in Palestine despite the protests of the indigenous Arab population in the land. Jabotinsky would not accept the partition of Palestine into two states. He wanted a Jewish state that expanded over all of the Land of Israel, including the Emirate of Transjordan which had been established on the eastern part of the mandate of Palestine by the British. The two central points of the Revisionist program were that Trans-Jordan belonged to the Zionists and that the British must reconstitute the Jewish Legion as a permanent part of the military force in Palestine. The British had dissolved the Jewish Legion and separated Trans-Jordan from the territory given to the Jewish state under the Balfour Declaration after World War I.

Ideologically, Revisionism advocated the creation of a Jewish state on both sides of the Jordan River, that is, a state which would include all of present-day Israel, as well as the West Bank, Gaza and either all or part of the modern state of Jordan. Nevertheless, the terms of the Mandate allowed the mandatory authority, Britain, to restrict Jewish settlement in parts of the mandate territory. In 1922, before the Mandate officially came into effect in 1923, Transjordan was excluded from the terms regarding Jewish settlement. In the Churchill White Paper of 1922, the British Government had made clear that the intent expressed by the Balfour Declaration was that a Jewish National Home should be created 'in' Palestine, not that the whole of Palestine would become a Jewish National Home. All three Revisionist streams, including Centrists who advocated a British-style liberal democracy, and the two more militant streams, which would become Irgun and Lehi, supported Jewish settlement on both sides of the Jordan River; in most cases, they differed only on how this should be achieved. (Some supporters within Labor Zionism, such as Mapai's Ben-Gurion, also accepted this interpretation for the Jewish homeland.) Jabotinsky wanted to gain the help of Britain in this endeavour, while Lehi and the Irgun, following Jabotinsky's death, wanted to conquer both sides of the river independently of the British. The Irgun stream of Revisionism opposed power-sharing with Arabs. In 1937, Jabotinsky rejected the conclusion of the Peel Commission, which proposed a partition of Palestine between Jews and Arabs; it was however accepted by the Labor Zionists. On the topic of "transfer" (expulsion of the Arabs), Jabotinsky's statements were ambiguous. In some writings he supported the notion, but only as an act of self-defense, in others he argued that Arabs should be included in the liberal democratic society that he was advocating, and in others still, he completely disregarded the potency of Arab resistance to Jewish settlement, and stated that settlement should continue, and the Arabs be ignored.

Jabotinsky believed Arab opposition to Zionism was inevitable and that any efforts at reconciliation with Arabs would be unsuccessful. He believed that voluntary consent from the Arabs to turn Palestine into a country with a Jewish majority was not possible. Since Jabotinsky anticipated that the Arabs would resist against Jewish settlement in Palestine, he believed that superior military force was the only way to make them accept a Jewish state. Because of this, Jabotinsky advocated for an "iron wall" to assist the Zionist movement, meaning that he wanted a military force independent of the Arab population that the Arabs would not be able to resist successfully. This military force would protect Jewish immigration to Palestine and would allow the goals of Zionism to be achieved. This was one of the more radical and militant perspectives among Zionist thinkers.

Jabotinsky believed that it was necessary for people to own private property in order to have liberty which was part of his anti-materialist, anti-communist world view. Despite this belief, he still promised that the bourgeois regime that he wanted to take power in the Jewish state would eliminate poverty. The economic crises of the Yishuv in 1926 and 1927 caused Revisionists to shift their support to urban development and private capital investment.

Five figures in particular contributed to the formation of Jabotinsky's ideology: English historian Henry Thomas Buckle, Italian philosopher and historian Benedetto Croce, social reformer Josef Popper-Lynkeus, philosopher Antonio Labriola, and Spanish philosopher Miguel de Unamuno. In particular, Jabotinsky sympathized with the ideas of Giuseppe Garibaldi because of Garibaldi's emphasis on European nationalism. Garibaldi believed that it was necessary for the rich and poor of a country to unite through love of their homeland. The strong emphasis on nationalism translated into Jabotinsky's own ideas about establishing a Jewish homeland.

=== Jabotinsky's position towards Fascism ===
Jabotinsky was unsympathetic towards fascism in his early years. However, he became increasingly aligned with fascism during the 1930s, agreeing with the outlawing of strikes and militarism that fascism entailed. Leftist propaganda described Jabotinsky as a fascist during the 1930s and he was seen as a fascist by many other Zionists. Jabotinsky supported the outlawing of strikes because he was fervently anti-socialist and saw socialism as incompatible with Zionism. He was sympathetic to the ideology of Italian dictator Benito Mussolini during the 1930s. This changed when Mussolini aligned himself with Adolf Hitler, at which point Jabotinsky ceased to associate with Mussolini. However, Jabotinsky retained his belief that the goals of Zionism could only be achieved by taking over Palestine through a military effort. Jabotinsky organized the Jewish Legion which was a force of 5,000 soldiers that contributed to the British conquest of Palestine during World War I. In addition, Jabotinsky organized the Haganah in 1920 which became a central part of the Israeli army in the future. Jabotinsky ruled out the possibility of establishing a police state, whether it was under communist or fascist leadership due to his belief in the necessity of having a regime under which the individual could thrive. However, he still viewed fascism as a pragmatic option and believed that democracy had not worked well in any country except for England. Jabotinsky said that there were three common factors between fascism and Revisionist Zionism which were the denial of a class struggle, "compulsory arbitration" of labor disputes, and prioritizing national interests over the interests of a specific social or economic class. The organization of the Revisionist movement under Jabotinsky was flawed since Jabotinsky's control of the movement was akin to European far-right groups in the 1930s.

=== From the Irgun to the Likud ===
The Irgun largely followed the Centrists' ideals but it followed them with a much more hawkish outlook towards Britain's involvement in the Mandate, and it had an ardently nationalist vision of society and government. After the establishment of the State of Israel, it was the Irgun wing of the Revisionist Party that formed Herut, which in turn eventually formed the Gahal party when Herut and the Liberal parties formed a united list called Gush Herut Liberalim (or the Herut-Liberal Bloc). In 1973 the new Likud Party was formed by a group of parties which were dominated by the Revisionist Herut/Gahal. After the 1977 Knesset elections it became the dominant party in a governing coalition, and up to the present day it has remained an important force in Israeli politics. In the 2006 elections, Likud lost many of its seats to the Kadima party which had formed the previous year when Ariel Sharon and others split to the left from Likud. The Likud bounced back in Israel's 2009 Knesset elections, garnering 27 seats, though still outnumbered by Kadima's 28. In spite of the fact that these right-of-center parties favored a Likud-led coalition, a coalition in which the members of the Likud party comprised the majority; the Likud was chosen to form the coalition. The party re-emerged as the strongest party in the Knesset in the 2013 elections and today it leads the government. In the years since the 1977 election, particularly in the last decade, Likud has undergone a number of splits to the right, including the 1998 departure of Benny Begin, the son of Herut's founder Menachem Begin (he rejoined Likud in 2008).

The party flag of Likud

While the initial core group of Likud's leaders such as Israeli Prime Ministers Begin and Yitzhak Shamir came from Likud's Herut faction, later leaders, such as Benjamin Netanyahu (whose father was Jabotinsky's secretary) and Ariel Sharon, have come from or moved to the "pragmatic" Revisionist wing.

The Revisionist idea of establishing a Jewish homeland over all of the Land of Israel played a role in shaping the ideas of members of Likud. Menachem Begin and Yitzhak Shamir, two former Israeli prime ministers and members of Likud, were both inspired by Jabotinsky's ideas. Menachem Begin opposed relinquishing the West Bank after Israel's victory in the Six-Day War. In addition, he opposed UN Resolution 242 because it would mean relinquishing Israeli control over part of the Land of Israel. Begin believed that the historic right of Jews to the Land of Israel came before the Palestinian claim to the land. Shamir would not compromise on the issue of the borders of the Land of Israel and opposed the Camp David Accords. Another member of Likud and prime minister of Israel, Benjamin Netanyahu, accepted the Oslo Accords, which was a diversion from the Revisionist idea of establishing a Jewish homeland over all of the Land of Israel.

== See also ==
- History of Zionism
- Jewish state
- List of Irgun members

== Bibliography ==
- Brenner, Lenni (1983), "Zionism-Revisionism: The Years of Fascism and Terror", Journal of Palestine Studies, vol. 13, no. 1, pp. 66–92.
- Flisiak, D (2020), Działalność syjonistów-rewizjonistów w Polsce w latach 1944/1945–1950, Lublin: Wydawnictwo Naukowe Tygiel Sp. z o.o., pp. 31–32.
- Heller, Daniel Kupfert (2017), Jabotinsky's Children: Polish Jews and the Rise of Right-Wing Zionism, Princeton, NJ: Princeton University Press, pp. 67–238, ISBN 978-0-691-17475-4
- Heller, Joseph (1995), The Stern Gang: Ideology, Politics and Terror, 1940–49, Frank Cass, p. 86, ISBN 0-7146-4558-3
- ——— (1998), "Zeev Jabotinsky and the Revisionist Revolt against Materialism: In Search of a World View", Jewish History, vol. 12, no. 2, pp. 51–67.
- Jabotinsky, Vladimir (1923), On the Iron Wall.
- Kaplan, Eran (2005), The Jewish Radical Right: Revisionist Zionism and Its Ideological Legacy, University of Wisconsin Press, ISBN 0-299-20380-8
- Peleg, Ilan (1987), Begin's Foreign Policy, 1977–83, Westport, CT: Greenwood Press.
- Peretz, Don (1994), The Middle East today, pp. 318–9, ISBN 978-0-275-94576-3
- Shelef, Nadav (Spring 2004), "From 'Both Banks of the Jordan' to the 'Whole Land of Israel': Ideological Change of Revisionist Zionism", Israel Studies, vol. 9, pp. 125–48.
- ——— (2018), Evolving Nationalism: Homeland, Identity, and Religion in Israel, 1925–2005, Cornell University Press, pp. 29, 83–4, ISBN 978-1-5017-2987-4
- Shlaim, Avi (1996), "Review: The Likud in Power: The Historiography of Revisionist Zionism", Israel Studies, vol. 1, no. 2, pp. 278–93.
- Sofer, Sasson (1988), Begin, an anatomy of leadership, London: Blackwell.
- Tzahor, Zeev (February 1988), "The Struggle between the Revisionist Party and the Labor Movement: 1929–1933", Modern Judaism, 8 (1): 15–25, doi:10.1093/mj/8.1.15, JSTOR 1396118.
- Wdowiński, David (1963), And We Are Not Saved, New York: Philosophical Library, p. 222, ISBN 0-8022-2486-5. Note: Chariton and Lazar were not co-authors of Wdowiński's memoir. Wdowiński is considered the "single author".
- Zouplna, Jan (2008), "Revisionist Zionism: Image, Reality and the Quest for Historical Narrative", Middle Eastern Studies, 44 (1): 3–27, doi:10.1080/00263200701711754, S2CID 144049644
- ההיסטוריה של התנועה [History of the Movement] (in Hebrew), IL: הליכוד - תנועה לאומית ליברלית, archived from the original on 15 December 2021.
