= Trade unions in Palestine =

- National organization(s): PGFTU (ITUC); GUPF (WFTU); GFIU
- Total union membership: 490,000

Global Rights Index
- 5+ No guarantee of rights due to breakdown of law

International Labour Organization
- Palestine is not a member of the ILO

The Palestinian trade union movement operates under shifting political landscapes; between the British, Egyptian (Gaza), Jordanian (West Bank) and Israeli labour law regimes, and the governing authorities of Hamas de-facto authority in Gaza, the Palestinian Authority and Israeli military orders in the West Bank. There is added challenge of divisions among the different Palestinian factions governing across West Bank and Gaza.

There are 3 trade union centers, the largest of which is the Palestinian General Federation of Trade Unions (PGFTU), affiliated to the International Trade Union Confederation. It has 220,000 members in the West Bank and 127,000 members in Gaza. Since the 2006 Fatah–Hamas conflict, PGFTU has struggled to maintain a unified organisation. While PGFTU has a coordination agreement with Histadrut, Gaza-PGFTU has called for boycotts, including against Histadrut.

The General Union of Palestinian Workers (GUPW) was established in the 1990s by Haider Ibrahim, who was a leader in exile of the Palestinian Trade Union Federation. He returned when he was appointed by Arafat as the first Deputy Minister of Labour in the Palestinian Authority. He failed to convince the new PGTUF to merge with GUPW. Future merger discussions failed over their respective international affiliations to the ITUC and WFTU, and cooperation with Histadrut. However the two unions agree to cooperate together.

The General Federation of Independent Unions was established in 2007 and recognized by the Ministry of Labour in 2011. It is closely linked to the NGO Democracy and Workers' Rights Center. It has 20,000 members amongst 21 federation. It has a pending ITUC membership since 2013.

== Repression ==
The International Trade Union Confederation (ITUC) ranked Palestine the worst possible score of 5+ in the Global Rights Index, a status shared with only 11 other countries in 2026.

== History ==
The Palestinian labour movement formed in 1920, shortly after Ottoman Palestine transformed into British Mandatory Palestine. The construction labour for the Palestine Railways between Cairo and Haifa fostered connections between Egyptian and Palestinian workers. Existing Egyptian unions, such as the Tram Workers' Union, the Railway Workers' Union, and the Trade Union of Employees engaged with Palestinian workers.

Histadrut, the first Israeli trade union formed in 1920. One year later, Palestinian railway workers applied to join, but they were rejected. In response, they formed the Club of Arab Railway Workers in 1923, with 30 initial members. After successfully petitioning the British Mandate to form a labour organisation, Palestine Arab Workers Society (PAWS) was established in 1925, the first Palestinian trade union, headquartered in Haifa. By 1946, it had 30 branches and 50,000 members. PAWS mobilised strikes, including the 1936 revolt which led to a 6-month long strike. The Palestine cause came at the expense of its labour organising.

In the 1940s, divisions in the Palestinian labour movement led to splits, including the formation of the Union of Arab Workers' Societies and Trade Unions in 1942, led by two Palestinian communists, Emile Touma and Bulus Farah. In 1945 it merged with other labor unions, to form the Arab Workers Congress.

By 1948 there was a low union density, only 1 out of 7 Palestinian workers were members of a trade union, predominantly in urban industrial cores, whereas most workers worked in agriculture.

=== West bank ===
Under Jordanian rule, Jordanian trade unions, including those representing Palestinians thrived until 1957, when Hussain, king of Jordan, restricted trade union activity. Between 1957 and 1961, the number of trade unions shrank from 39 to 16.

The General Federation of Trade Unions, which was already dominated by West Bankers in 1954, relocated its headquarters from Amman to its present location in Nablus. It was the precursor to the Palestinian General Federation of Trade Unions (PGFTU).

Ironically, after the Israeli occupation of the West Bank, Palestinian trade union membership grew. Because of economic hardships, more Palestinians worked in factories and on construction sites inside Israel and within West Bank urban centers. Initially, trade unions were led solely by the Palestinian Communist Party. In the 1970s, other parties including the DFLP, PFLP and, later, Fatah also organised popular movements, through trade unions. During the first intifada, national liberation struggles overshadowed labour issues. Alongside this, party factionalism led to two competing PGFTU factions. By the 1990s, Palestinian People's Party, Fatah and PFLP had merged the existing 150 faction-based unions into 12 industrial unions under Fatah governance.

From 1970, when Palestinian workers commuted across the Israeli Green Line, the Israeli trade union Histadrut initially declined to address the poor working conditions of Palestinians, arguing that Histadrut primarily represented workers who were Israeli citizens. Despite this, Histadrut still collected union dues from Palestinian workers for representation under Israeli collective agreements. The PGFTU estimates that around NIS400 million was collected by Histadrut between 1970 and 1994.

The Oslo Accords period in the early 1990s, which saw the establishment of the Palestinian Authority (PA), was marked by internal power struggles among unelected leaders within the Palestinian General Federation of Trade Unions (PGFTU). In 1995, the PGFTU and Histadrut agreed to split the union dues collected by Histadrut from Palestinian workers. As the PGFTU itself cannot represent workers in Israeli courts, Histadrut employs four Israeli-Arab lawyers, the only lawyers allowed to represent Palestinian workers inside Israel. Despite the formal cooperation, the relationship is weak. Smaller NGOs such as Democracy and Workers' Rights Center and Kav LaOved, take on more political cases, e.g. those concerning the rights of Palestinian workers in West Bank settlements.

In 2007, a landmark ruling by the Israeli High Court in the "Givat Zeev" case declared that Israeli labour law applied to Palestinian workers in the settlements where the employer was Israeli.

==== Teacher's strike ====
In 1997, teachers went on a wildcat strike, demanding a 200% salary increase in their monthly salaries of $300 to $400. The strike was led by the Teachers Coordinating Committee which is unaffiliated with either the PGFTU or the PA. A month later, Yasser Arafat tried to convince them to end the strike. When they refused, he ordered the arrest of 15 of the leaders, accusing them of taking orders from Syria. They were released after a week, without any gains for teachers. According to Professor Bassem Makhoul from al-Najah University, "...If they had been in Fatah they would have been protected. But then, if they had been in Fatah, they would not have gone on strike." PGFTU leader Shahir Sa'ad discouraged the strike and supported the PA's strike disruptions. He justified by saying, "it is illegal under Jordanian law for public sector employees to strike. I don't necessarily support this law, but it is the law."

=== Gaza ===
Before 1948, there was limited trade union activity in the Gaza Strip. Gaza was primarily agrarian, whereas the labour movement was industrial focused. PAWS established chapters in Gaza City and Khan Yunis. Shortly after 1948, Egypt retained control over Gaza. The Egyptian Kingdom immediately outlawed all trade union activities, including the two Gaza based PAWS branches and the Arab Workers Congress. The anti-communist ban on trade union activity remained in effect until 1954. Even after the ban was lifted, organising workers in Gaza remained challenging, due to the massive unemployment amongst the recent Palestinian refugee population and agrarian economy.

In 1954, two years after the Nasser revolution, trade unions were legalised, but Gazan trade unions did not revive until 1964 with the establishment of Palestinian Workers Trade Unions Federation concurrently with the creation of Palestinian Liberation Organization.

After the Israeli occupation of Gaza in 1967, trade unions were banned until 1980. Furthermore, Israel employed Gazans as a policy, within the green line. Due to numerous restrictions on trade union activity (approval for new members was required), even after union membership was legalised in 1980, Gaza only had 500 members according to the International Labour Organization. A 1987 vote was blocked off by Israeli authorities, but union members managed to enter the International Committee of the Red Cross building and vote anyways. By 1993, union membership increased to 11,000 members.

In 2013, a Trade Union Law was passed by Hamas, the de-facto authority, which reduces the autonomy over unions.

== See also ==
- Category:Trade unions in Palestine
