= Moshe Levin =

Politician

Leader of the Palestinian Communist Party
- In office 1922–1928

Personal details
- Born: 1896
- Died: 1943 (aged 46–47)
- Party: Jewish Communist Party (Poalei Zion), Socialist Workers Party, Palestinian Communist Party

Moshe Levin (1896–1943), alias 'Batlan' and 'Elisha', was a Russian Jewish socialist. He was a member of the Jewish Communist Party (Poalei Zion) in Russia, before arriving in Palestine in 1919, where he joined the Socialist Workers Party.

Levin ran in the 1920 Histadrut election on the list of the party, under the alias 'L. Elisha'. When the party was divided in 1922, he became a leader of the Palestinian Communist Party, along with Menachem 'Oskar' Finkelstein.

After the reunification of the party into the Palestine Communist Party, he voiced opposition towards the 'Arabization' efforts inside the party. In 1928 he was deported to Poland. During the Second World War, he shifted his residence to the Soviet Union.
