= Federation of Arab Trade Unions and Labor Societies =

Former trade union

FATULS, the Federation of Arab Trade Unions and Labor Societies (Ittihad al-Niqabat wa'l-Jam'iyyat al-'Arabiyya, Arabic: اتحاد النقابات والجمعيات العربية, later merged with the Arab Workers' Congress) was an Arab trade union organization formed in 1942 in Mandatory Palestine by Marxist activists led by Bulus Farah (a former member of the Palestine Communist Party), who split away from the Palestine Arab Workers Society (PAWS) in 1942. By the end of that year it had recruited around 1,500 members, including workers in the Haifa area petroleum sector, Haifa port, and the British military camp.

FATULS concentrated on "shopfloor" issues and argued that only socialist revolution would address the workers' needs by liberating Palestine from the imperialist stranglehold. It was allied to the National Liberation League. The Federation's newspaper al-Ittihad was distributed widely and read by the overwhelming majority of labor.

In 1945, 11 PAWS branches, including those in Jaffa, Jerusalem, and Gaza, seceded from the organization, citing disagreements with PAWS' conservative political leanings and dissatisfaction with its nondemocratic leadership style. Together, these branches formed a new labor organization, the Arab Workers Congress (AWC), into which FATULS merged.

The organization was banned following Jordan's annexation of the West Bank in 1950.

== Further sources ==
- Aruri, Naseer Hasan (1972). Jordan: A Study in Political Development (1923-1965). Springer. ISBN 90-247-1217-3
- Beinin, Joel (2001). Workers and Peasants in the Modern Middle East. Cambridge: Cambridge University Press. ISBN 0-521-62903-9
- Connell, Dan (2001). Rethinking Revolution: New Strategies for Democracy & Social Justice: The Experiences of Eritrea, South Africa, Palestine and Nicaragua. The Red Sea Press. ISBN 1-56902-145-7
- Lockman, Zachary. (1996). Comrades and Enemies: Arab and Jewish Workers in Palestine, 1906–1948. University of California Press. p. 319. ISBN 9780520917491.
- Younis, Mona M. (2000). Liberation and Democratization: The South African & Palestinian National Movements. University of Minnesota Press. ISBN 0-8166-3299-5

== See also ==
- Palestine Arab Workers Society
- Palestine General Federation of Trade Unions
- Histadrut
