= Shmuel Schneurson =

Historical Zionist leader in the Soviet Union

Shmuel Schneurson was a leader of the underground Zionist movement Hechalutz in the Soviet Union from 1922 to 1928. Though he had the option of remaining in British Palestine during his 1927 visit, he chose to return to the USSR to organize underground Zionist activities. He was arrested in February 1928 and sentenced to a correction camp in the Ural Mountains, followed by a three-year sentence in Siberia. In 1934, he was released and returned to Moscow. After applying for an exit permit to return to Palestine, he was promptly rearrested and sentenced. His final whereabouts remain unknown. In 1946, his former landlady received a letter informing her of his death.

Schneurson is a descendant of Rabbi Shneur Zalman of Liadi, the founder of Chabad hasidism.
