= Forois =

1926 Palestinian Yiddish-language organ

- Founded: 1926
- Ceased publication: 1932
- Political alignment: Palestine Communist Party
- Language: Yiddish
- Country: Mandatory Palestine

Forois (Yiddish: פאָרויס, 'Forward') was the Yiddish-language organ of the Palestine Communist Party, launched in 1926, ceased publication in 1932.
