= Avi Nissenkorn =

Israeli politician

- אבי ניסנקורן
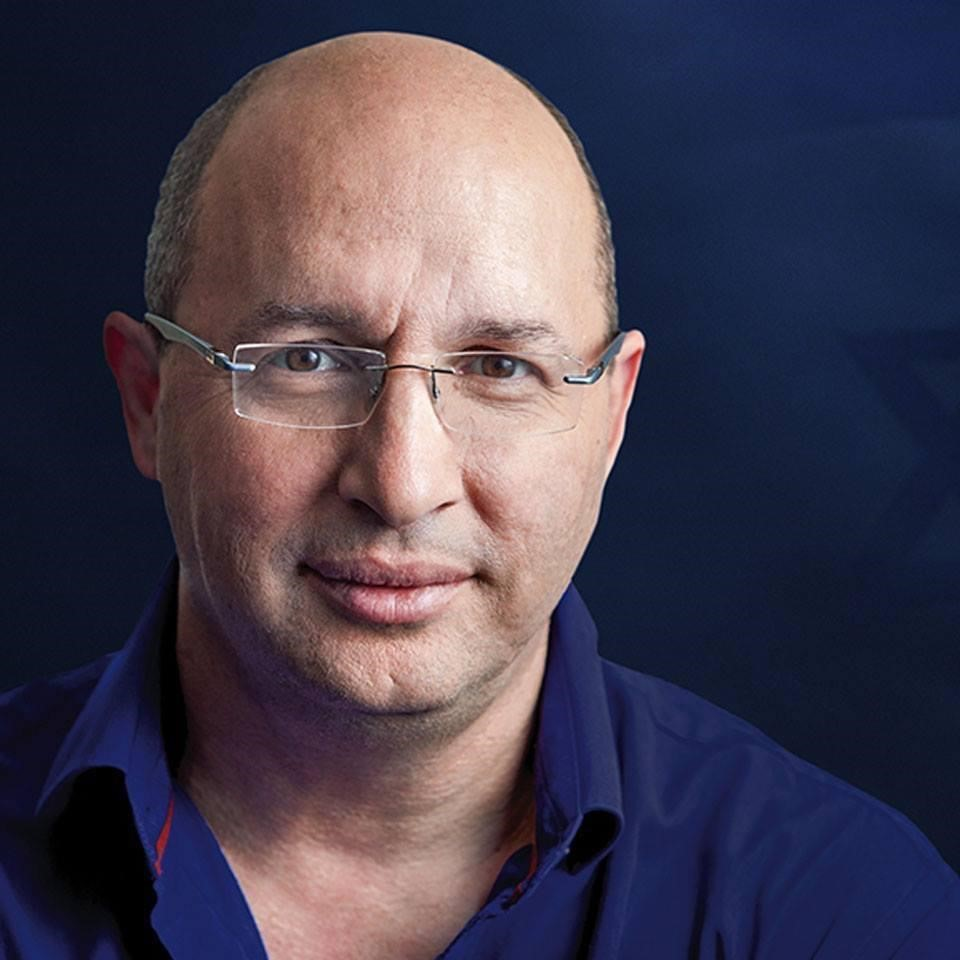

Ministerial roles
- 2020–2021: Minister of Justice

Faction represented in the Knesset
- 2019–2021: Blue and White

Personal details
- Born: 20 March 1967 (age 59) Afula, Israel

Abraham Daniel "Avi" Nissenkorn (Hebrew: אברהם דניאל "אבי" ניסנקורן; born 20 March 1967) is an Israeli lawyer and politician. He served as a member of the Knesset for Blue and White from 2019 to 2021, and as Minister of Justice from 2020 to 2021. He previously served as General Secretary (chairman) of the Histadrut labor union between June 2014 and March 2019. He currently serves as Chairperson of the Executive Board of Ben-Gurion University of the Negev.

== Biography ==
Avraham (Avi) Nissenkorn was born in Afula to Israel and Ilana, physicians who immigrated from Poland. He was Israel's youth sprinting champion, and holds the underage Israeli record for 200 m. He participated in the 1986 World Junior Championships in Athletics – Men's 200 metres. In the Israel Defense Forces, he served as a sports instructor at Bahad 4.

Nissenkorn studied at Tel Aviv University and earned a bachelor's degree in law.

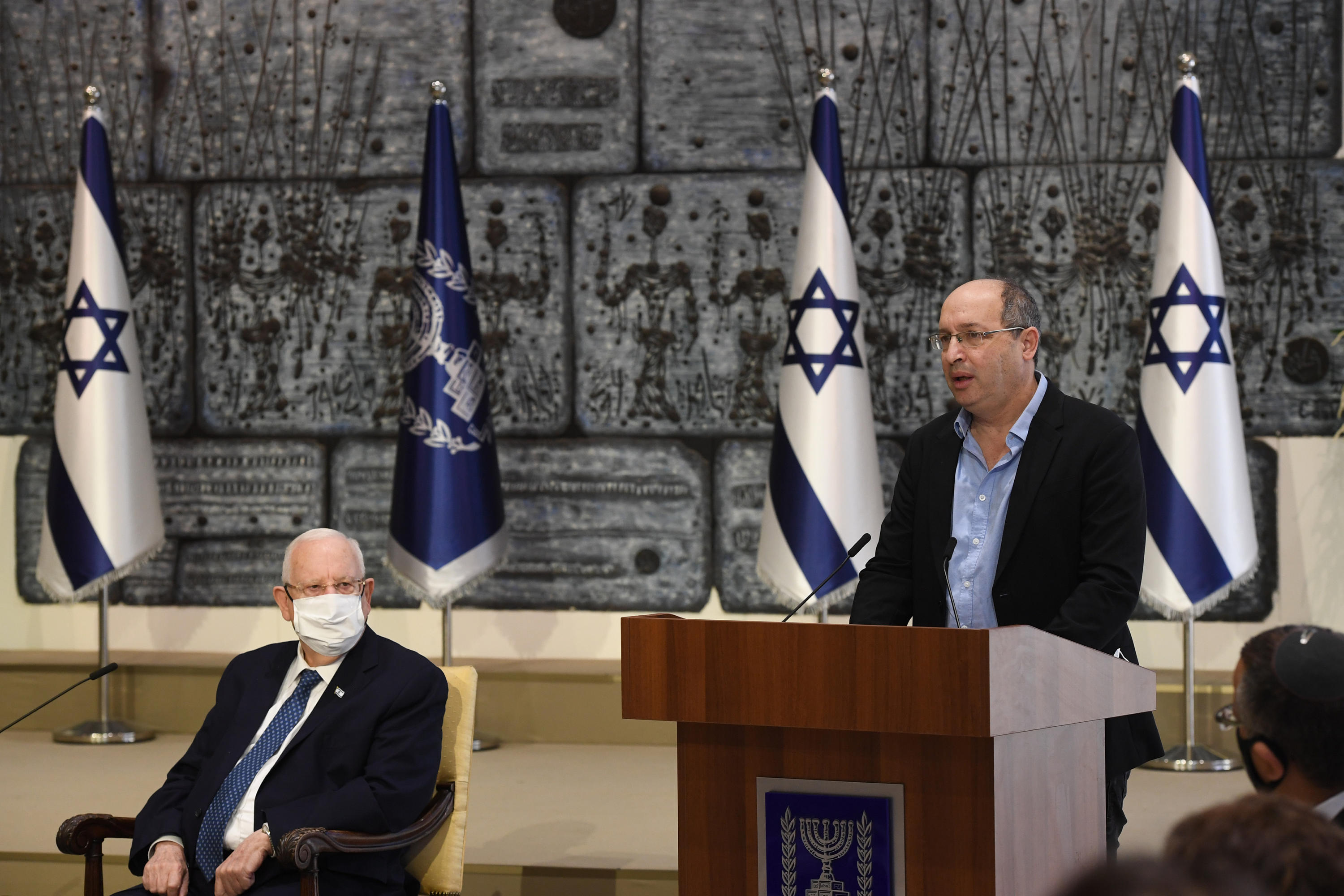
Nissenkorn with President Rivlin in 2020. In the background is an Israeli relief made of basalt ash.

Nissenkorn met his wife Andrea while studying at Tel Aviv University. They have two children, Ori and Ron and live in Hod HaSharon. His younger son Ron has severe epilepsy.

== Legal career ==
Nissenkorn started his career with an internship at Benjamin M. Cohen and Associates, a Tel Aviv law firm.

Nissenkorn began at the Histadrut trade union in the late 1990s, as head of the collective agreement department. He continued as head of the legal department of Histadrut's professional unions. In this capacity, he participated in negotiations related to large-scale government reforms, such as the transition from budgetary to cumulative pensions, Bezeq's privatization and others. In 2001 he founded a private law firm specializing in labor laws, and returned to Histadrut in 2010 at Eini's request, to chair the professional unions—a position considered second only to the general secretary. He sold the private firm to Orna Lin & Co.

In May 2014, following chairman Ofer Eini's resignation, Nissenkorn ran uncontested in an internal leadership election, where Histadrut's 171-member parliament would pick the new chairman, as a member of Eini's Oganim faction. The election itself was contested by Labor politician Eitan Cabel. Cabel claimed that the internal election was illegal and that in the case of a chairman's resignation, general Histadrut elections would have to be called. The case reached the Supreme Court, where it was struck down.

As chairman, Nissenkorn helped finalise a deal that ensured contract workers working for government agencies would move to direct employment, and agreements for general pay raises for government employees. However, he was criticized for not doing enough to curb the contract worker phenomenon in practice, as well as over-representing major labor unions at the expense of ordinary workers.

== Political career ==
In February 2016, Nissenkorn registered as a member of the Labor Party. In February 2019, in the lead-up to the April 2019 national elections, Nissenkorn joined the Israel Resilience Party led by Benny Gantz. He was placed fifth on the party list, and was reportedly promised a ministership by Gantz should the faction succeed in forming a government. On 17 May 2020, Nissenkorn was sworn in as Israeli Minister of Justice. In December 2020, he announced that he would join Ron Huldai's new party, The Israelis. He was replaced by Vladimir Beliak. Nissenkorn left The Israelis on 31 January 2021.
