= Motel Blue =

- Directed by: Sam Firstenberg
- Written by: Cormac and Marianne Wibberley
- Produced by: Didier Hoarau
- Starring: Sean Young
- Cinematography: Moshe Levin
- Edited by: Phil Russman; Peter Zinner
- Music by: Robert O. Ragland
- Release date: 1997
- Country: United States
- Language: English

Motel Blue (also known as Blue Motel) is a 1997 thriller film directed by Sam Firstenberg and starring Sean Young.

== Plot ==
Kyle Rivers has joined the Department of Defense as an investigator. Her first assignment is to do a background check on Lana Hawking, scientist for a top secret clearance.

== Cast ==
- Sean Young as Lana Hawking
- Soleil Moon Frye as Agent Kyle Rivers
- Rob Stewart as Agent Daniel Larimer
- Robert Vaughn as Chief MacIntyre
- Spencer Rochfort as Steven Butler
- Barry Sattels as Wayne Hawking
- Seymour Cassel as Capistrano Minister
- Malcolm Yates as Dr. Jeremy Marks
- James Michael Tyler as Oscar Bevins
- Lou Rawls as Gospel Minister
- John LaMotta as Agent Sands
- Sonya Eddy as Motel Blue Maid
