= Der Avangard =

- Founded: August 1, 1920
- Ceased publication: 1921
- Political alignment: Labour Zionism
- Language: Yiddish language
- City: Minsk
- Country: Belorussian Soviet Socialist Republic

Der Avangard (Yiddish: דער אַוואַנגאַרד, 'The Vanguard') was a Yiddish language newspaper published by the Jewish Communist Party (Poalei Zion) (EKP(PZ)) from Minsk 1920-1921. It was edited by an editorial collective, headed by Jacob Lifshitz (in charge of the EKP(PZ) Main Committee for White Russia and a member of the EKP(PZ) Central Committee). The newspaper proclaimed the EKP(PZ) to be 'the sole representative of the Jewish working class'.

17 issues were published in 1920, 6 issues in 1921. The first issue was published on August 1, 1920, as the organ of the Minsk Committee of EKP(PZ). From its eight issue, it functioned as the Organ of the EKP(PZ) Main Committee of for White Russia. Issues of the newspaper had two pages, with a 34x48 cm format. Initially copies of Der Avangard were sold for 5 rubles, but from its fifth issue the price was doubled to 10 rubles. The newspaper was printed at 20, Gubernatorskaya Street.
