= Jaffa riots (May 1921) =

1921 riots in Jaffa, Mandatory Palestine

1921 Jaffa riots
- Part of the intercommunal conflict in Mandatory Palestine
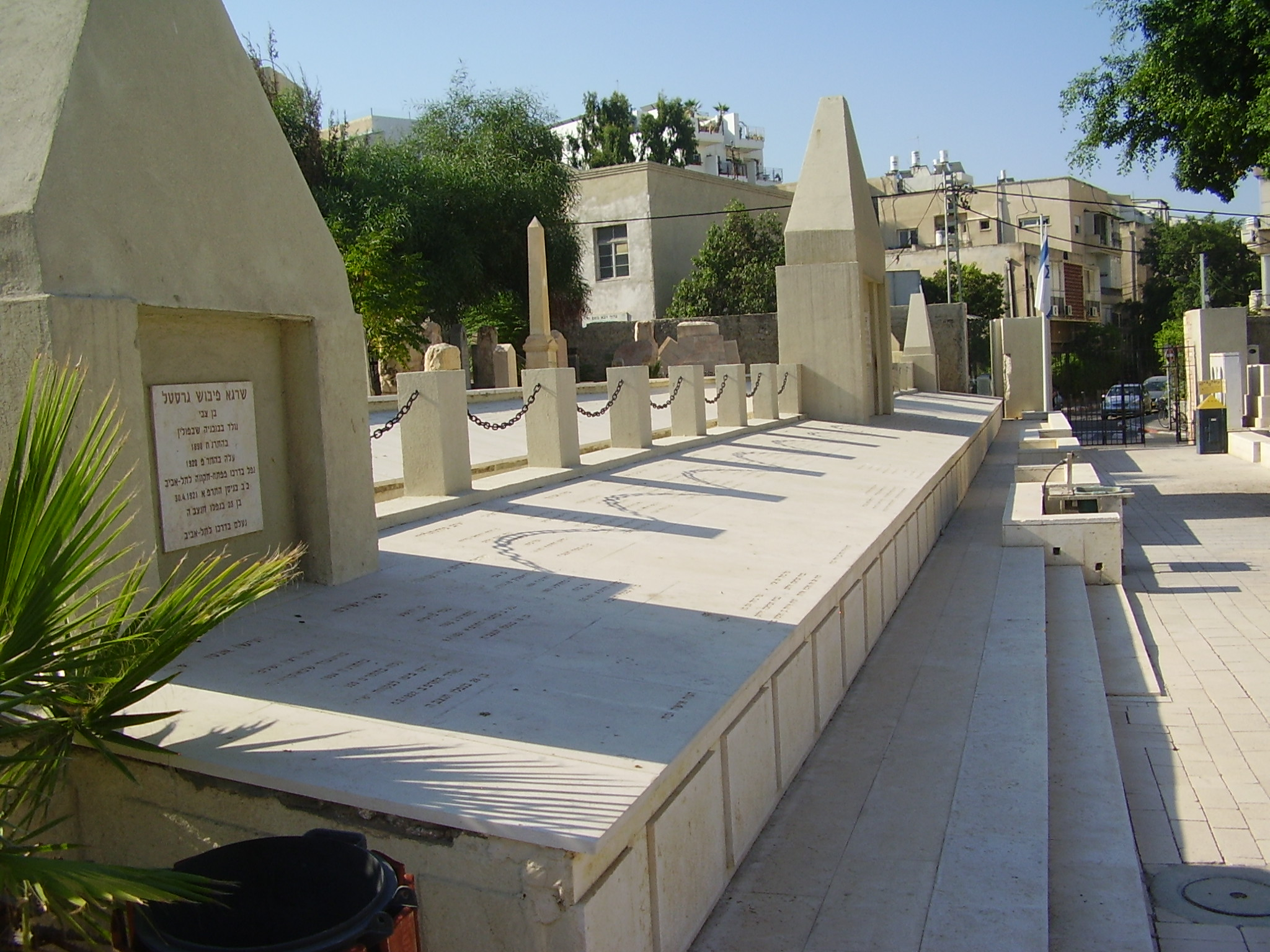
- Mass grave of Jewish victims of the 1921 riots, Trumpeldor Cemetery, Tel Aviv
- Date: 1–7 May 1921
- Location: Jaffa, Mandatory Palestine; 32°3′7″N 34°45′15″E
- Caused by: Dispute between Jewish groups mistakenly reported as an attack on Arabs

Parties
Jewish civilians	Arab civilians

Casualties and losses
47 deaths, 146 injured	48 deaths, 73 injured
- Most of the Arab casualties were caused by British forces

The Jaffa riots (commonly known in Hebrew: מאורעות תרפ"א, romanized: Me'oraot Tarpa) were a series of violent riots in Mandatory Palestine on May 1–7, 1921, which began as a confrontation between two Jewish groups but developed into an attack by Arabs on Jews and then reprisal attacks by Jews on Arabs. The rioting began in Jaffa and spread to other parts of the country. The riot resulted in the deaths of 47 Jews and 48 Arabs, with 146 Jews and 73 Arabs wounded.

== Events ==
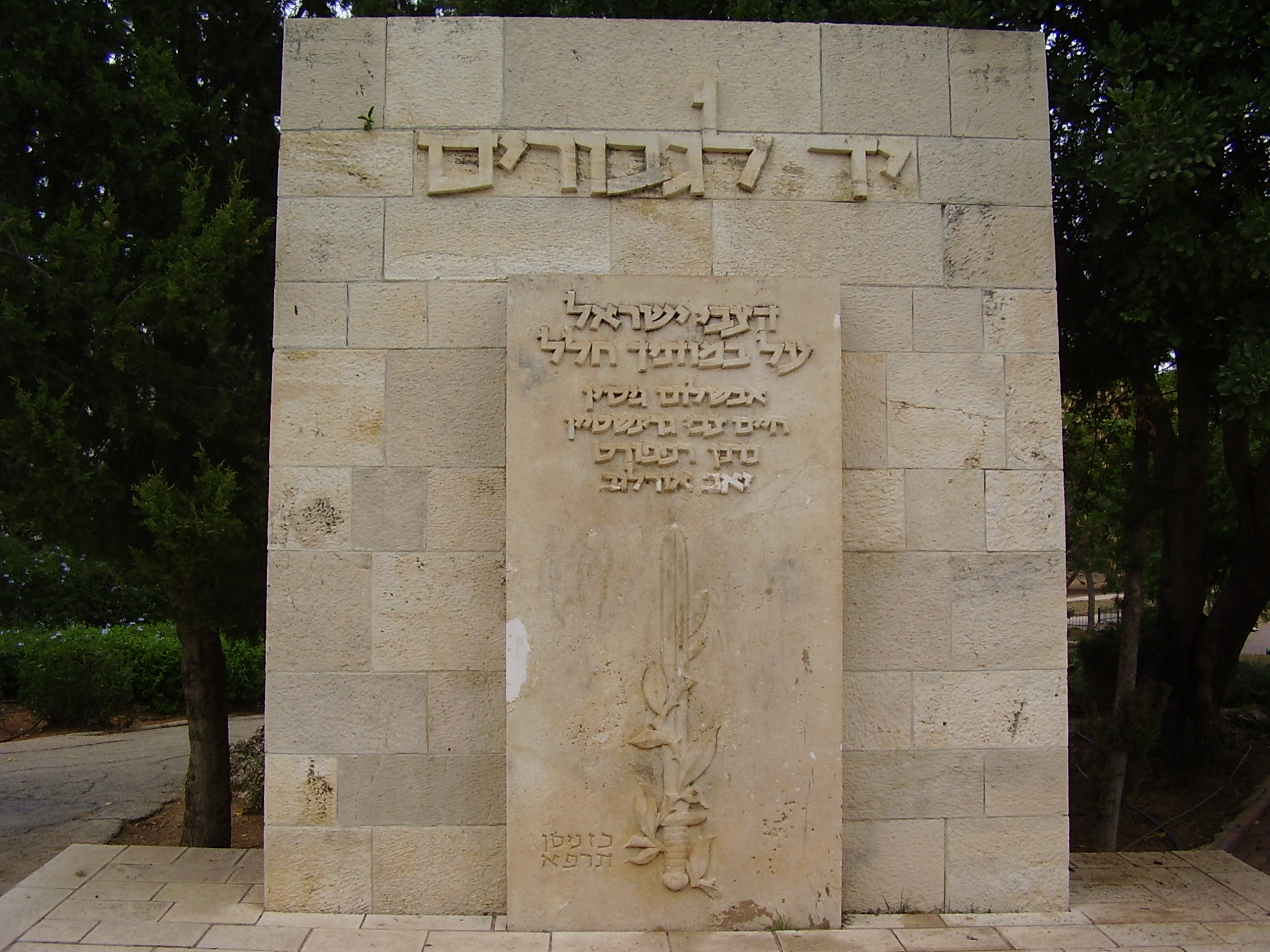
Memorial for victims of the 1921 Jaffa riots, Petah Tikva

On the night of 30 April 1921, the Jewish Communist Party (precursor of the Palestine Communist Party) distributed Arabic, Hebrew, and Yiddish fliers calling for the toppling of British rule and the establishment of a "Socialist Soviet Palestine." The party announced its intention to parade from Jaffa to neighbouring Tel Aviv to commemorate May Day. On the morning of the parade, despite a warning to the 60 members present from one of Jaffa's most senior police officers, Toufiq Bey al-Said, who visited the party's headquarters, the march headed from Jaffa to Tel Aviv through the mixed Jewish–Arab border neighbourhood of Manshiyya.

Another large May Day parade had also been organized for Tel Aviv by the rival socialist Ahdut HaAvoda group, with official authorization. When the two processions met, a fistfight erupted. Police attempted to disperse the about 50 communist protestors. A general disturbance quickly ensued and spread to the southern part of town.

Dozens of British, Arab, and Jewish witnesses all reported that Arab men bearing clubs, knives, swords, and some pistols broke into Jewish buildings and murdered their inhabitants, while women followed to loot. They attacked Jewish pedestrians and destroyed Jewish homes and stores. They beat and killed Jews in their homes, including children, and in some cases split open the victims' skulls.

At 1:30 pm, an immigrant hostel run by the Zionist Commission and home to a hundred people who had arrived in recent weeks and days was attacked by the mob, and though the residents tried to barricade the gate, it was rammed open and Arabs attackers poured in. The stone-throwing was followed by bombs and gunfire, and the Jewish hostel residents hid in various rooms. When the police arrived, it was reported that they weren't shooting to disperse the crowd, but were actually aiming at the building. In the courtyard one immigrant was felled by a policeman's bullet at short-range, and others were stabbed and beaten with sticks. Five women fled a policeman firing his pistol; three escaped. A policeman cornered two women and tried to rape them, but they escaped him despite his shooting at them. A fourteen-year-old girl and some men managed to escape the building, but each was in turn chased down and beaten to death with iron rods or wooden boards.

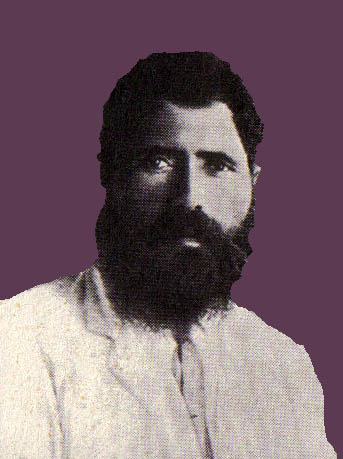
Yosef Haim Brenner

The violence reached as far as Abu Kabir. The Jewish Yitzker family owned a dairy farm on the outskirts of the neighbourhood, in which they rented out rooms. At the time of the riots, Yosef Haim Brenner, one of the pioneers of modern Hebrew literature was living at the site. On May 2, 1921, despite warnings Yitzker and Brenner refused to leave the farm and were murdered, along with Yitzker's teenaged son, his son-in-law and two other renters.

As in the previous year's Nebi Musa riots, the mob tore open their victims' quilts and pillows, sending up clouds of feathers. Some Arabs defended Jews and offered them refuge in their homes; many witnesses identified their attackers and murderers as their neighbours. Several witnesses said that Arab policemen had participated.

On May 2, Jews in the Haganah began launching reprisal attacks on Arabs – the first of their kind. Armed with automatic weapons, at least one group of Haganah militants broke into Arab homes with instructions to "destroy everything, sparing only small children." Their commander who gave the order reported "good results" in response to his instructions. The chief force behind the creation of the Haganah, Eliyahu Golomb, reported that at least one of the group's militants had killed a disabled Arab and his children in an orange grove. Several Jews were arrested, including one policeman, for their suspected involvement in the shooting of Arab civilians, but were not charged due to lack of evidence. Haganah archives indicate, however, there was a "grain of truth" to the charges. Of the 48 Arab dead, who were mostly killed by the Palestine Police Force, it was unclear how many were killed in revenge attacks by Jews.

High Commissioner Herbert Samuel declared a state of emergency, imposed press censorship, and called for reinforcements from Egypt. General Allenby sent two destroyers to Jaffa and one to Haifa. Samuel met with and tried to calm Arab representatives. Musa Kazim al-Husseini, who had been dismissed as Jerusalem's mayor on account of his involvement in the previous year's Nebi Musa riots, demanded a suspension of Jewish immigration. Samuel assented, and two or three small boats holding 300 Jews were refused permission to land, and were forced to return to Istanbul. At the same time, al-Husseini's nephew, Amin al-Husseini, was appointed Grand Mufti of Jerusalem, a decision that later faced much criticism.

An American architect of Russian Jewish origin, Peres Etkes, who worked for the Mandatory authorities, secretly transferred a stock of rifles from the British-run Jaffa armoury to supply Jewish forces in the riots. Fighting went on for several days and spread to nearby Rehovot, Kfar Saba, Petah Tikva, and Hadera. British aircraft dropped bombs "to protect Jewish settlements from Arab raiders."

== Immediate aftermath ==
The riot resulted in the deaths of 47 Jews and 48 Arabs. 146 Jews and 73 Arabs were wounded. Most Arab casualties resulted from clashes with British forces attempting to restore order. Thousands of Jewish residents of Jaffa fled for Tel Aviv and were temporarily housed in tent camps on the beach. Tel Aviv, which had been previously lobbying for independent status, became a separate city due in part to the riots. However Tel Aviv was still dependent on Jaffa, which supplied it with food, services, and was the place of employment for most residents of the new city.Jewish casualties would have been higher had it not been for a British officer, Major Lionel Mansell Jeune, whose actions in intervening are credited with saving some 100 Jewish immigrants.

The victims were buried at the Trumpeldor Cemetery, established in Jaffa in 1902. The newspaper HaTzfira reported that meetings across the country had been postponed, all parties and celebration had been cancelled and schools closed for four days. The newspapers on May 3 appeared with black borders.

The newspaper Kuntress, whose author and co-editor Yosef Haim Brenner was one of the victims of the riots, published an article entitled Entrenchment. The article expressed the view that the Jews' outstretched hand had been spurned but that they would only redouble their efforts to survive as a self-reliant community.

Some villages whose residents had participated in the violence were fined and a few rioters were brought to trial. When three Jews, including a policeman, were convicted of participating in the murder of Arabs, international outcry ensued. Although the Supreme Court ultimately acquitted them on grounds of self-defence, the incident served to continue the crisis of confidence between the Jewish community and the British administration. Three Arab men were tried for the murder of Brenner, but were acquitted due to reasonable doubt. Toufiq Bey al-Said, who resigned from the Jaffa police, was shot in the street; his assassin was dispatched by veterans of Hashomer in retribution for Brenner's murder, though another Jewish man was wrongly accused and acquitted.

The Arab leaders submitted a petition to the League of Nations in which they expressed their demands for independence and democracy, noting that the Arab community contained sufficient educated and talented members to establish a stable representative democracy.

== Investigative commission ==
High Commissioner Sir Herbert Samuel established an investigative commission headed by the Chief Justice of the Supreme Court in Palestine, Sir Thomas Haycraft (see Haycraft Commission of Inquiry). Its report confirmed the participation of Arab policemen in the riots and found the actions taken by the authorities adequate. The report angered both Jews and Arabs: it placed the blame on the Arabs, but said that, "Zionists were not doing enough to mitigate the Arabs' apprehensions." The report concluded that, "the fundamental cause of the violence and the subsequent acts of violence was a feeling among the Arabs of discontent with, and hostility to, the Jews, due to political and economic causes, and connected with Jewish immigration." .

The report included an Appendix summarising the findings as follows.

- The fundamental cause of the Jaffa riots and the subsequent acts of violence was a feeling among the Arabs of discontent with, and hostility to, the Jews, due to political and economic causes, and connected with Jewish immigration, and with their conception of Zionist policy as derived from Jewish exponents.
- The immediate cause of the Jaffa riots on the 1st May was an unauthorised demonstration of Bolshevik Jews, followed by its clash with an authorised demonstration of the Jewish Labour Party.
- The racial strife was begun by Arabs, and rapidly developed into a conflict of great violence between Arabs and Jews, in which the Arab majority, who were generally the aggressors, inflicted most of the casualties.
- The outbreak was not premeditated or expected, nor was either side prepared for it ; but the state of popular feeling made a conflict likely to occur on any provocation by any Jews.
- The general body of Jews is opposed to Bolshevism, and was not responsible for the Bolshevik demonstration.·
- When the disturbance had once begun an already acute anti-Jewish feeling extended it into an anti-Jewish riot. A large part of the Muslim and Christian communities condoned it, although they did not encourage violence. While certain of the educated Arabs appear to have incited the mob, the notables on both sides, whatever their feelings may have been, aided the authorities to allay the trouble.
- The police were, with few exceptions, half-trained and inefficient, in many cases indifferent, and in some cases leaders of or participators in violence.
- The conduct of the military was admirable throughout.
- The raids on five Jewish agricultural colonies arose from the excitement produced in the minds of the Arabs by reports of Arabs having been killed by Jews in Jaffa. In two cases unfounded stories of provocation were believed and acted upon without any effort being made to verify them.
- In these raids there were few Jewish and many Arab casualties, chiefly on account of the intervention of the military.
- This résumé is necessarily too condensed to be regarded as the expression of the conclusions of the Commission, except when read in conjunction with the report.

== Consequences ==
In a speech in June 1921 on the occasion of the Royal birthday, Samuel stressing Britain's commitment to the second part of the Balfour Declaration, declared that Jewish immigration would be allowed only to the extent that it did not burden the economy. Those who heard the speech had the impression that he was trying to appease the Arabs at the Jews' expense, and some Jewish leaders boycotted him for a time.

The Palestine government imposed fines on Arab villages and tribes believed to have been collectively involved in the riot. They were Tulkarm, Kakon, Kalkilieh, Kafr Saba, the Wadi Hawareth Bedouin and the Abu Kishik tribe.

New bloody riots broke out in Jewish Quarter of Jerusalem on November 2, 1921, when five Jewish residents and three of their Arab attackers were killed, which led to calls for the resignation of the city's commissioner, Sir Ronald Storrs.

== See also ==
- Arab nationalism
- Palestinian nationalism
- Churchill White Paper
