= Arnon Bar-David =

Israeli trade unionist (born 1957)

- ארנון בר-דוד
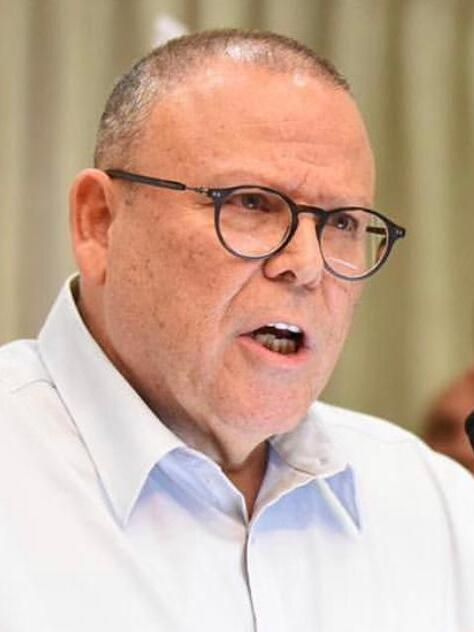
- Born: 1957 (age 67–68); Tel Aviv
- Education: University of Tel Aviv
- Occupations: Trade unionist, Civil servant
- Years active: 1993-present

Arnon Bar-David (Hebrew: ארנון בר-דוד; born 1957) is an Israeli trade unionist and civil servant. He is the Chairman of the Histadrut since March 2019.

== Biography ==
Arnon Bar-David was born in 1957 in Tel Aviv. His father worked in the city's water plant. In 1975, Bar-David enlisted in the IDF, joining the Naval Academy, and later served as a company commander in the Armored Corps. After the conclusion of his service, Bar-David became a coordinator of the Hebrew Scouts, studied history at Tel Aviv University, and worked as a sports correspondent for Hadashot in 1986, before becoming an editor until 1990. Bar-David additionally worked as a department manager in the Education Administration of the Tel Aviv-Yafo Municipality until 1993.

== Trade union career ==
In 1993, Bar-David joined the Tel Aviv's trade union, later becoming its chairman until 2006. from 2006 to 2019, Bar-David served as the Chairman of the Union of Clerical and Public Service Employees of the Histadrut.

In March 2019, after Avi Nissenkorn joined the Blue and White list and resigned as Chairman of the Histadrut, Bar-David was elected by the Histadrut House of Representatives to the post of chairman of the Histadrut.

One of his first acts after he took office was the closure of the Davar Rishon website, which criticized his entry into the post, his predecessor Nissenkorn and Moshe Kahlon. On May 1, an alternative news site went live. Bar-David was re-elected as chairman on 24 May 2022. defeating former chairman Ofer Eini and winning 78% of the vote to Eini's 22%.

He was a vocal critic of the Israeli government's economic response to the COVID-19 crisis, warned that Israel stands on the verge of an “economic Yom Kippur War.” Bar David repeatedly called on authorities to release cash to keep struggling businesses afloat.

He ordered a strike in the Histadrut on September 1, 2024 to pressure the government to reach a hostage deal.

== Legal issues ==
Dozens of people connected to the Histadrut were arrested on 3 November 2025, including Bar-David and his wife, on allegations of bribery, fraud and breach of trust, money laundering, and tax offenses, following a two year investigation. He was remanded for eight days because he is "connected to public officials, businesspeople, and others", as well as concerns about the possibility of influencing witnesses. The union gave a statement that it was confident in its members and would cooperate with investigators. The remand was extended by three days on 10 November. He was released on 13 November to house arrest for 30 days, a contact ban, suspension from leadership of the union, requirement to remain 500 meters from union buildings, 180,000 NIS security, and a 180 day travel ban. The conditions extended a further 90 days on 22 December.
