= Ofer Eini =

Israeli tax advisor and politician

- עופר עיני
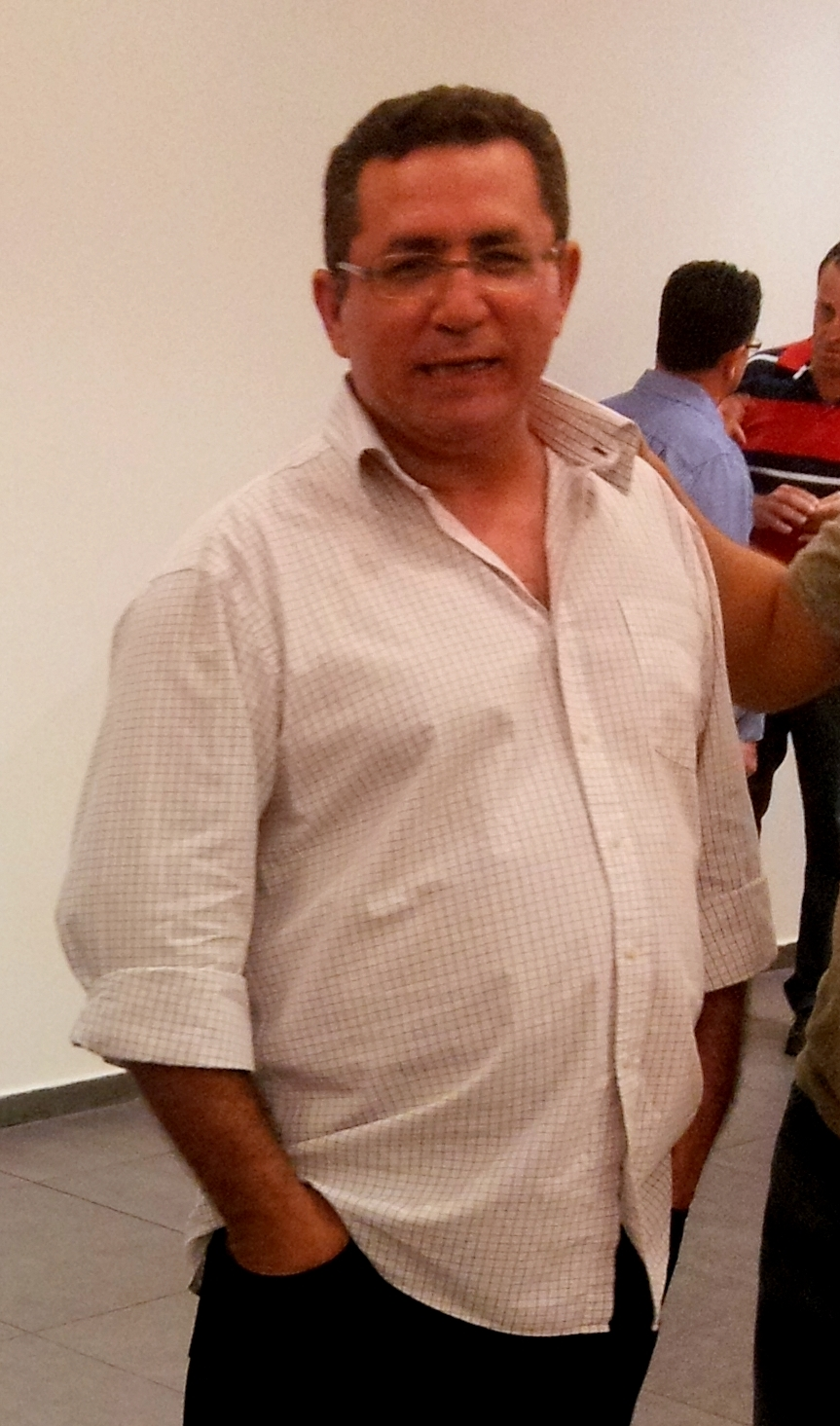
- Born: January 24, 1959 (age 66); Beersheba, Israel
- Known for: Chairman of the Histadrut (2006-2014); Chairman of the Israel Football Association (2014-2018)

Ofer Eini (Hebrew: עופר עיני; born 24 January 1959 in Beersheba) is an Israeli tax advisor and politician. From 2006 to 2014 he served as the Secretary General of the Histadrut. Immediately after he served as the chairman of the Israel Football Association (2014–2018).

Eini challenged Arnon Bar-David for the leadership of the Histadrut in 2022. he was defeated by Bar-David, who won 78% of the vote to Eini's 22%.
