= Gershon Dua-Bogen =

Polish politician (1892–1948)

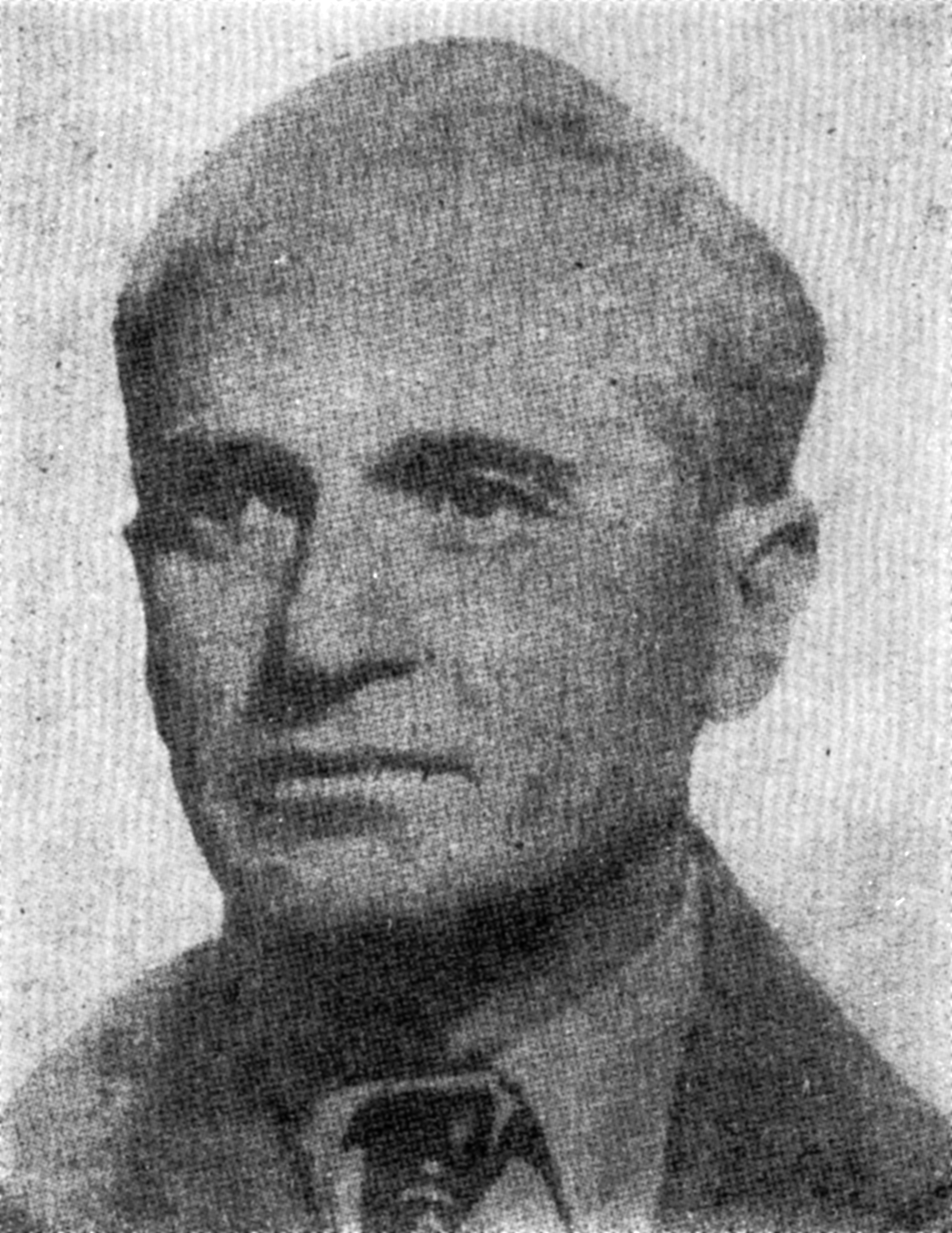

Personal details
- Born: 4 May 1892 Siedlce, Congress Poland
- Died: 12 February 1948 (aged 55) near Oświęcim, Polish People's Republic
- Party: Communist Party of Poland; Polish Workers' Party
- Other political affiliations: Socialist Workers Party
- Nickname: 'Admoni'

Gershon Dua-Bogen (Yiddish: גרשון דוא-באָגען; 4 May 1892 – 12 February 1948), alias 'Admoni', was a Polish-Jewish communist leader. He was an active militant of the Communist Party of Poland (KPP) and of the Polish Workers' Party (PPR). He emigrated to the British Mandate of Palestine and became the general secretary of the Socialist Workers Party. He was expelled from the territory by the British for his political activities. During the Spanish Civil War, he served as a political commissar in the base of the International Brigades in Albacete. He died in a car crash near Oświęcim in 1948.

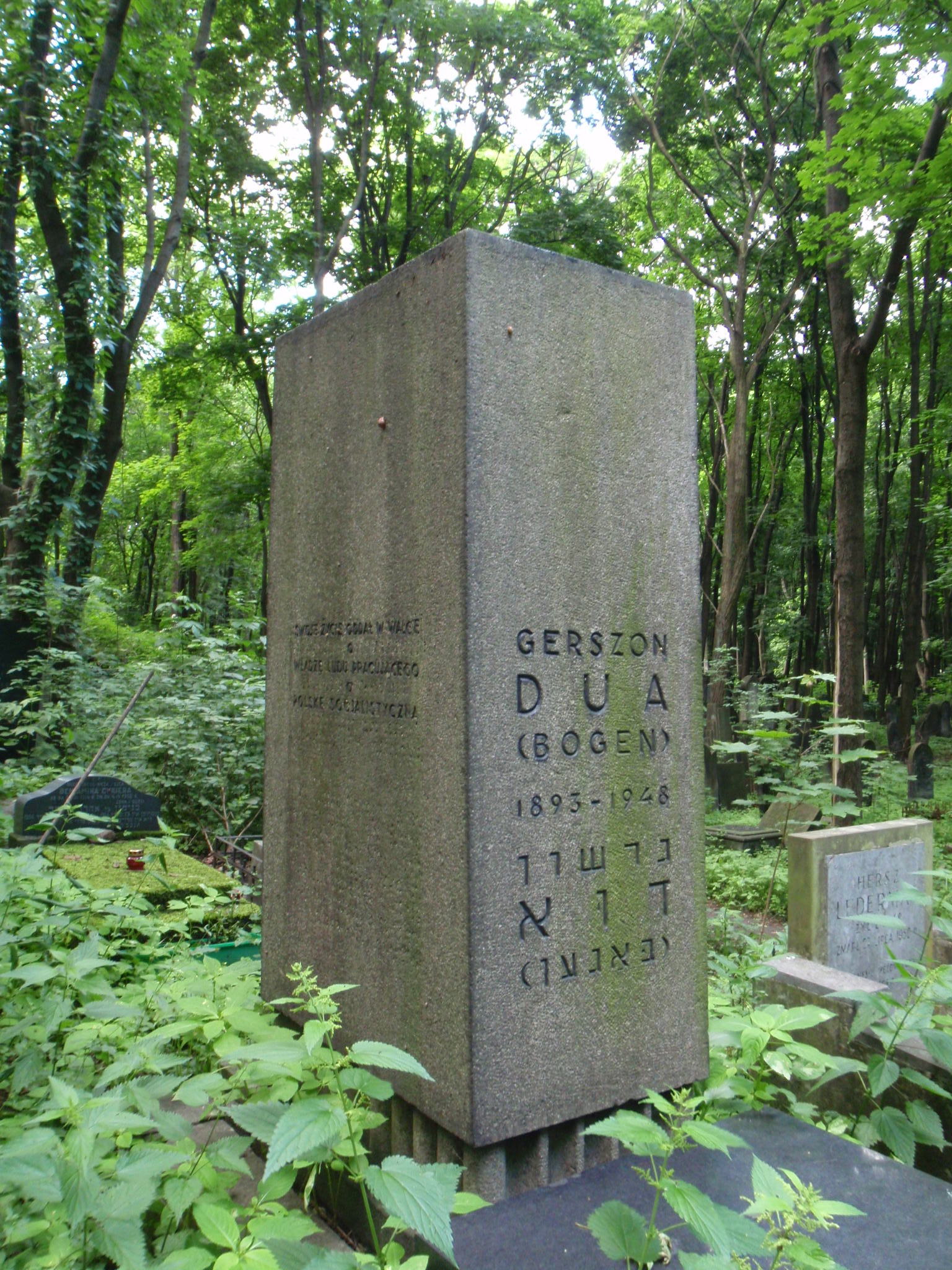
Gershon Dua-Bogen's gravestone in Warsaw

== Bibliography ==
- Dua-Bogen, Gershon, and Mirski, Michal. אויף די שפורן פון גבורה, Oyf di shpurn fun gvure. Steven Spielberg digital Yiddish library, no. 07087. Amherst: National Yiddish Book Center, 2000. (in Yiddish)
