= Bulus Farah =

Palestinian trade unionist

Bulus Farah (1910–1991) was a Palestinian trade unionist who founded the Federation of Arab Trade Unions and Labor Societies in 1942. He began working in the Haifa workshops in 1925 as a fifteen-year-old apprentice. Farah was one of the first Arab leaders of the Palestine Communist Party to go to study in Moscow at the Communist University of the Toilers of the East. In 1945, he attended the World Trade Union Conference in London.

He is also known as the author of a book on the railway workers of the post-World War I period, entitled Min al-'uthmaniyya ila al-dawla al-'ibriyya.
