= 1965 Histadrut election =

Internal elections of the Israeli trade union centre Histadrut were held in 1965. 862,000 Histadrut members were eligible to vote, out of whom 77.69% took part in the polling.

== Results ==
Party	Votes	%	Seats
Mapai–Ahdut HaAvoda Alignment	333,068	50.87%	408
Mapam	99,599	15.20%	122
Gahal (Herut–Liberal Bloc)	95,028	14.51%	116
Rafi	79,428	12.13%	97
Independent Liberals	28,934	4.42%	35
Israel Communist Party	10,355	1.58%	13
New Communist List	8,369	1.28%	10
Overall	669,270 (14,549 invalid votes)	100%	801
Source:		Turnout - 77.69%	
