= Palestine Arab Workers Society =

Former labor organisation

The Palestine Arab Workers' Society (PAWS - Jam'iyyat al-'Ummal al-'Arabiyya al-Filastiniyya; Arabic: جميعة العمّال العربية الفلسطينية) established in 1925, was the main Arab labor organization in the British Mandate of Palestine, with its headquarters in Haifa.

The Palestine Arab Workers' Society was inactive until January 1930, when it organised in Haifa the first countrywide congress of Arab workers. Sixty-one delegates claiming to represent some 3,000 workers attended. Almost half the delegates came from Haifa itself, and nearly half of those represented the railway workers there who constituted the PAWS' main support base. Smaller contingents from Jerusalem, Jaffa, and other towns represented workers in a variety of trades. Though a number of Arab unionists who belonged to or sympathized with the Palestine Communist Party helped organise the congress, it was largely under the control of the more conservative and noncommunist unionists who had originally founded the PAWS in 1925. The congress resolved to set up a nationwide labor movement which would lead the struggle to improve the wages and working conditions of Arab workers and secure their rights. It also declared its opposition to Jewish immigration and Zionism and its support for Palestine's independence as an Arab state. In response to Zionist efforts to secure a large percentage of government jobs for Jews, on the grounds that Jews paid a disproportionately large share of taxes, the congress called on the government of Palestine to reserve for Arab workers a share of jobs equal to the proportion of Arabs in the general population. This first Arab workers' congress proved not a new beginning for the Arab labor movement in Palestine but an isolated incident. The PAWS was unable to follow up and lay the basis for an effective countrywide organization, and for the next few years it remained an organization whose base was largely restricted to Haifa and to railway workers. Nonetheless, the congress made at least some Histadrut leaders feel that a coherent program of activity among Arab workers was now an urgent necessity.

From 1937 onwards, its general secretary was Sami Taha. Branches formed in Jaffa, Nazareth and al-Majdal. After Taha repeatedly refused to obey demands of the Arab Higher Committee (AHC), dominated by the al-Husayni members and loyalists, Taha was assassinated in September 1947, on the orders of Haj Amin al-Husseini, the Grand Mufti of Jerusalem and leader of the Palestine Arabs.

In 1945, John Asfour attended the World Trade Union Conference in London on behalf of the society.

== See also ==
- Federation of Arab Trade Unions and Labor Societies
- Palestine General Federation of Trade Unions

== Other sources ==
- Beinin, Joel (2001). Workers and Peasants in the Modern Middle East. Cambridge: Cambridge University Press. ISBN 0-521-62903-9
- Bernstein, Deborah S. (2000). Constructing Boundaries: Jewish and Arab Workers in Mandatory Palestine. SUNY Press. ISBN 0-7914-4539-9
