= Vladimir Beliak =

Israeli politician

- וְלָדִימִיר בֶּלִיאׇק
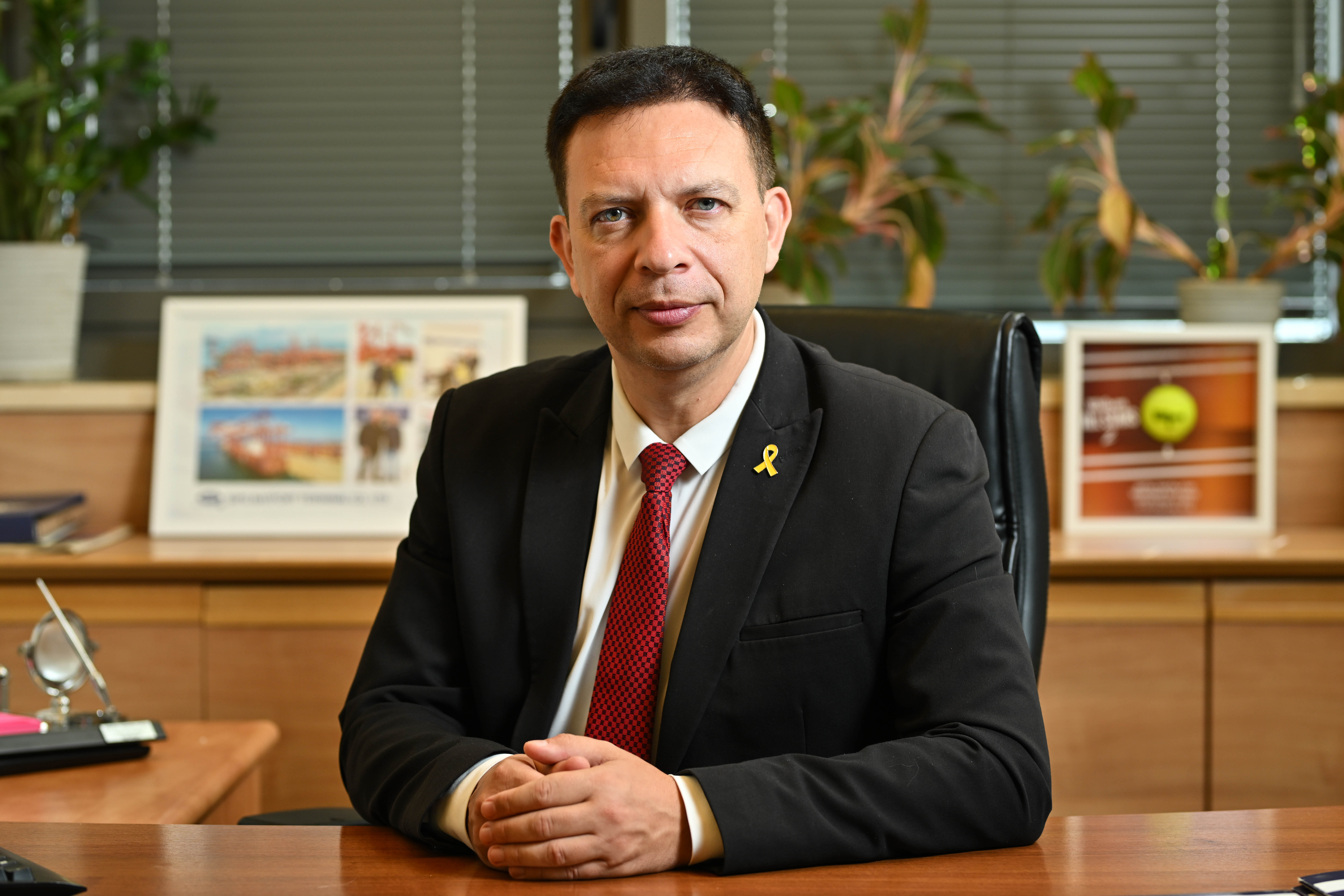

Faction represented in the Knesset
- 2020–2026: Yesh Atid

Personal details
- Born: 16 August 1973 (age 53) Kemerovo, Russian SFSR, USSR

Vladimir Beliak (Hebrew: וְלָדִימִיר בֶּלִיאׇק; Russian: Владимир Белиак, born 16 August 1973) is a Russian-Israeli politician. He served as a member of the Knesset for Yesh Atid from 2020 until 2026. He is a former consultant and (municipal) director.

== Biography ==
He was born in Kemerovo in the Soviet Union, which later became a part of modern Russian Federation. He immigrated to Israel in 1998.

He was a replacement for former Blue and White MK Avi Nissenkorn, who left Blue and White to join Ron Huldai's The Israelis party. Beliak was placed fifteenth on Yesh Atid's list for the 2021 elections and retained his seat in the Knesset as the party won seventeen seats.

Beliak is a member of the Knesset's Finance Committee.
