= 1920 Histadrut election =

Internal elections in the Histadrut Labor Union

Elections to the first congress of the Zionist trade union centre Histadrut were held in 1920 (the congress itself convened on December 4, 1920). In total 4433 of about 7000 Jewish workers in Palestine participated. The election was marred by irregularities, and the Jewish Socialist Workers Party (MPSI) protested against the 'fraudulent behaviour' of the dominant parties after the election.

== Results ==
Party	Votes	%	Delegates
Ahdut HaAvoda	1864	42.0%	38
Hapoel Hatzair	1324	29.9%	27
List of New Immigrants	842	19.0%	16
Jewish Socialist Workers Party	303	6.8%	6
