= Alisa Fuss =

German-Israeli human rights activist (1919–1997)

Alisa Fuss (born Ilse Miodownik; 7 April 1919 – 20 November 1997) was a German-Israeli human rights activist and teacher. Born and raised in Berlin, in 1935 she moved to Mandatory Palestine where she supported the establishment of a Jewish state. After becoming disillusioned with Zionism following the 1936–1939 Arab revolt in Palestine, she began volunteering with the Palestine Communist Party, serving custodial prison sentences in 1940 and between 1956 and 1960. After a period working as a teacher, Fuss returned to Germany in 1976, where she became a noted activist in support of the rights of Palestinians, as well as refugees and asylum seekers.

== Early life and education ==
Fuss was born on 7 April 1919 into a Jewish family living in Berlin, Germany. Her father, Jakob Miodownik, was the son of immigrants from Eastern Europe, while her mother, Erna (née Levy), was from a middle-class family from Berlin. Between 1924 and 1925, Fuss' father converted the ground floor of the family home in Zehlendorf into a synagogue, due to there being no public synagogues in the local area.

From 1925, Fuss started her education at the Familienschule Zehlendorf-West, a non-denominational private school. From 1929, she attended the VI. Städtischen Lyzeums in Charlottenburg until the family moved to Breslau later that year, following which she enrolled at the local lyceum.

While in Breslau, Fuss became acquainted with the local Jewish youth movement, and joined the Jung-Jüdischen Wanderbund (lit. 'Young Jewish Hiking League'), an increasingly socialist organisation. Fuss left the local lyceum when she was told to use the Nazi salute, and spent a year at the Jüdischen Gymnasium, a Jewish gymnasium, before leaving in 1934 to begin an apprenticeship as a painter. At around this time, Fuss began identifying as a Zionist, which she later attributed to being "because of Hitler... but also out of conviction".

== Emigration to Palestine ==
Fuss lived alone in Breslau until September 1935 when she emigrated to Palestine; her parents left Germany in April 1935, using false documents to travel to Uruguay and onto Argentina, and later died in 1940 and 1942, which Fuss attributed to "the hardships" of moving to South America. She first lived at the Israelitischen Mädchenheim (lit. 'Jewish Girls' Home') before later living in a HeHalutz house to prepare her for making aliyah. Fuss unsuccessfully attempted to obtain a visa for her brother to join her in Palestine; they would not reunite in person until 1980.

After arriving in Palestine, Fuss initially lived in a kibbutz in Ra'anana, and worked on citrus plantations on the coastal strip between Haifa and Tel Aviv. During the 1936–1939 Arab revolt in Palestine, Fuss left the kibbutz after disagreeing with the actions of the Zionist paramilitary organisation Haganah, which she believed was violating its principle of self-defence by preemptively raiding Arab villages. She moved to Jerusalem, where she hoped to study, though she ended up working in construction sites and as a domestic servant to make a living.

== Rejection of Zionism and embrace of communism ==
After moving to Jerusalem, Fuss felt that her political ideas had been "betrayed" following the response of Zionist organisations to Arabs during the revolt, and began to reject Zionism, which she saw as working oppressively and collaboratively with British Mandate authorities, which she deemed to be "colonial", to expel and displace Arab Palestinians in favour of their Jewish counterparts. Fuss joined the Palestine Communist Party (PKP), where she first met her future husband, Chaim Preschel. During the Arab revolt, the British Mandatory government officially banned the PKP; in 1940, Fuss was arrested while taking part in a PKP operation and was placed into administrative detention without charge or conviction for a year.

In 1956, Fuss was arrested again, this time with Helmut Fuss, who had become her second husband, after their names were reportedly found on a list of informants by the Security Service, the secret police of Poland. Fuss was sentenced to six years in prison, though this was reduced to four years after Haim Cohn, a prosecutor and later judge of the Supreme Court of Israel, intervened. Fuss' husband was sentenced to four years in prison.

== Teaching career ==
Fuss began her teaching career at Ben Shemen, a youth village, having qualified as a teacher in 1949. After her release from prison, she taught at Broshim, a special education school in Tel Aviv from 1960, while studying at Al-Quds University and Tel Aviv University. Fuss went on to work in teacher training and professional development, and began regularly representing the Israeli Society for Special Education at international conferences. From 1968, she started publishing German-language educational and psychological journals, which brought her to the attention of the German educator Hartmut von Hentig. In 1976, Fuss moved to Bielefeld, West Germany, to work with von Hentig at the Laborschule.

== Human rights activism ==
In 1980, Fuss returned to Berlin, where she joined the International League for Human Rights, going on to become its president in 1992. In 1982, Fuss co-founded with Fritz Teppich the Jüdischen Gruppe Berlin (lit. 'Jewish Group Berlin'), in response to the outbreak of the Lebanon war; the group sought to distance Jews in Berlin from the actions and views of the government of Israel, which had authorised an invasion of Lebanon, triggering the conflict. The JGB was described as being one of the first grassroots Jewish groups to operate in Germany since World War II, and was noted for holding positions contrary to the country's official Jewish groups, particularly on the issues pertaining to Israel and Palestine. Fuss argued that she argued for Palestinian rights due to her standing for "humanity, solidarity, and against oppression" for Israelis as well as Palestinians. She called for "clearly defined borders for Israel", "a Palestinian state" and "pacification of Lebanon".

That same year, Fuss was invited to speak before War Resisters' International, where she gave a presentation on Jewish pacifists and the Israeli–Palestinian conflict. During this time, she began working with Ossip K. Flechtheim.

During her time in Germany, Fuss also co-founded the Flüchtlingsrates Berlin (lit. 'Berlin Refugee Council'), which in 1989 was awarded Gustav Heinemann Citizens' Prize in recognition for its work; she likened the plight of refugees to Jews fleeing the Holocaust. In 1982, Fuss chained herself to the building housing the Berlin Senate Department for Justice and Consumer Protection to protest the planned deportation of a Turkish asylum seeker Cemal Kemal Altun and, alongside Flechtheim, appealed to the musician Yehudi Menuhin and Pope John Paul II to intervene on Altun's behalf. Fuss felt that the fight against antisemitism should be linked with the fight against racism and xenophobia, and described her support of Altun and other asylum seekers as being "solidarity between a former victim of persecution and a current victim of persecution".

During the Gulf War in 1991, Fuss launched the Atempause (lit. 'Respite') project, which aimed to provide Israeli and Palestinian mothers and their children a place to rest and recuperate with their families in Berlin.

== Return to Israel and death ==
In 1997, experiencing worsening health, Fuss returned to Israel, settling in Tel Aviv where her children lived. She died on 20 November 1997 at the age of 78. Fuss' personal archives are stored at the Fritz Bauer Institut in Frankfurt.
