= Israeli labor law =

Labor law in Israel

Israeli labor law provides a number of protections to workers in Israel. They are governed by the Basic Laws, the Hours of Work and Rest Law, as well as various other laws, statutes, and regulations.

== Unions ==
Labor unions are legal in Israel, and about one-third of the workforce is unionized. The Histadrut, a large federation of trade unions, has a prominent place in Israel's economy and society. Workers in most industries have a right to strike provided a fifteen-day notice of intention to strike is given. It is illegal to fire a worker for unionizing and participating in union activities, including strikes. However, the right to strike is restricted in the civil service and in institutions considered vital such as medicine, water, energy, and the police force. Israeli labor courts are tasked with settling labor disputes. There are five regional labor courts which handle local disputes, and the National Labor Court in Jerusalem, which handles nationwide strikes, collective disputes, and appeals of decisions of the regional courts.

=== History of Collective Bargaining ===
Wage bargaining in Israel has changed from a very centralized corporatist system that collectively represented almost all workers, to a decentralized, pluralist, system with many wage agreements in different sectors of labor. Until the 1990s, bargaining was negotiated between the Private Employers' Association representing businesses and the Histadrut representing the labor force. The state's role in these negotiations was unofficial and its main purpose was to promulgate the new agreements to the people. Negotiations over wages were conducted at the statewide level, determining standard pay across whole sectors of industry. Due to a decrease in both union and employer association memberships, it has been harder to collectivize workers across labor sectors. This decentralization is also attributed to the rise of unions outside the traditional Histadrut, or General Federation of Trade Unions, which had previously not been allowed under the laws of the more corporatist system.

=== Israel's Labor Evolution ===
Israel's history, and its changes from corporatist to pluralist exhibit its position as a unique type of economy. Coordination between the government, labor, and employers in regard to how wages are set show its distinction from liberal economies like the United States. The massive influence of the Histadrut in the mid to late 20th century shows a very centralized government who allowed high levels of corporatism with the state's largest labor union in administering public health care and public pension funds. With the state-owned military equipment industry replacing more traditional job sectors like agriculture in the 1980s, Israel progressed into a more industrial economy. It is only in the past few decades, as large-scale industrial work has seen a decline, and service sector jobs have increased, that the Histadrut has lost power. In the 1990s former soviet scientists came to Israel and helped the country further its diversity of exports in order to become a more competitive country in the world economy.

In the 21st century, Israel has shown itself to have great potential from its younger generation as it achieved the 2nd highest rate of 25-64 year olds who had achieved tertiary education. This new younger generation may prove to change Israel's labor system and further bring it into a more service-sector oriented world.

== Workweek and hours ==
Israeli law sets out a 43-hour workweek. This was reduced to 42 hours as of 1 April 2018. For those with a five-day workweek, the length of a work day is set out as 8.6 hours, while those with a six-day workweek have a work day of 8 hours, with a half-day of work on Friday. Those with a work day of at least six hours are entitled to 45 minutes of rest, including an uninterrupted 30-minute break, although with a special permit those working in non-manual jobs can have full workdays without breaks. However, in practice, additional time is added to make up for these breaks, leading to a maximum 45-hour workweek. As a result, many employees in Israel work 45 hours a week, or 9 hours a day for 5 days. Any work beyond these hours is considered overtime. Overtime work is illegal unless a permit is obtained from the Ministry of Labor, and is subject to certain conditions. The first two hours of overtime must be compensated at a rate of 125% of their hourly wage, and any overtime work beyond that must be compensated at a rate of 150% of their hourly wage. No more than four hours of overtime work can be performed in a single day. Those with a six-day workweek cannot work more than 12 hours of overtime per week, while those with a five-day workweek cannot work more than 15 hours of overtime per week. Those who work during a religious holiday are entitled to pay at 150% of their hourly rate and an alternative day off. Employers are prohibited by law from compelling their employees to work more than 47 hours per week.

== Discrimination ==
Discrimination over race, religion, age, sexual preference, or disability is banned. It is also illegal to fire a pregnant employee unless the employer can satisfy the Ministry of Labor that the reasons for termination are unrelated to the pregnancy. Employers other than government security bodies and those providing services to children or the mentally or physically disabled are prohibited by law from conducting criminal background checks of job candidates.

== Leave entitlements ==
All Israeli workers are entitled to a weekly consecutive rest period of at least 36 hours, although with a special permit from the Ministry of Labor, it can be reduced to a minimum of 25 hours. Israelis typically follow a Sunday-Thursday five-day workweek, although some have a Sunday-Friday six-day work week with a half-day on Friday. This is done to accommodate the Jewish Sabbath and Muslim Jumu'ah.

All Israeli employees with a five-day workweek are entitled to a minimum of 12 paid vacation days for the first four years of employment, while those with a six-day workweek are entitled to 14 days. This gradually increases after four years to a maximum of 28 days. There are also 9 paid public holidays, including a continuous two-day one: The first and second days of Rosh Hashanah, Yom Kippur, the first day of Sukkot, Simchat Torah, the first and last days of Passover, Yom HaAtzma'ut, and Shavuot.

Workers are also entitled to 18 days of paid sick leave per year, and a female employee who has worked for the same employer for one year is entitled to 26 weeks of maternity leave, although she can divide it with the father, and those on parental leave are entitled to an allowance from the government for the first 14 weeks. It is illegal to fire someone on maternity leave or within 60 days after its conclusion.

=== Labor Rights for Migrants ===
There are high levels of immigrants in Israel's workforce, with most being authorized immigrants and a smaller percentage being unauthorized. By 1999, when immigrants made up 16% of the full-time labor force, they made up an even higher 27% of part-time labor. More recently in 2001, of the total 2,500,000 workers in the labor force, about 200,000 are immigrants. These migrant workers usually take low-paying jobs in the private sector, where they can be exploited without adequate protection from labor laws The inclusion of migrant workers in the labor force limit the bargaining power of Israeli workers for higher wages, as they tend to take low-paying part-time jobs which are outside collective bargaining agreements. In 2000, 80.2% of male migrant workers were paid less than minimum wage. In 1991, the Israeli Parliament, the Knesset, passed the Foreign Workers’ Law (Unlawful Employment and the Guarantee of Decent Conditions) to protect immigrants from being subject to the market economy without any labor protections. Under the law, employers are required to pay into a fund that provides social benefits for migrant workers. Additionally, in an attempt to protect the wages of all migrant workers, the law advocates for employers to set up collective agreements with their workers, similar to how Israel's large private sector has been coordinated.
