= World Trade Union Conference =

1945 gathering of trade unions

The World Trade Union Conference was a conference that was held between 6–17 February 1945. The conference was participated by countries from all around the world, at the County Hall, London. Regarded as a significant moment within the international labour movement, it was the first time that workers from around the world came together to influence international politics.

Both Clement Attlee and King George VI spoke to the audience at the conference. 204 representatives from 63 Unions around the world attended the conference including those from the Soviet Union, in an attempt to have representation within the United Nations and its Security Council. The conference, which was organised in the vein of the anti-fascist movement, being much inspired by both union and state notions of a new world order and influenced by the interests of the allied nations. Anti-war, post war reconstruction post-war and Trade Union were on the conference agenda.

The conference resulted in the Declarations of the World Trade Union Conference, which were published in San Francisco by the Trade Union Council in 1945 and inspired the Fifth Pan-African Congress to be held later that same year in Manchester.

One of the purposes of the conference was to create a draft constitution for the World Federation of Trade Unions, which was established at the first World Trades Union Congress, which was convened in Paris in October 1945.

== Attendees ==
The committee consisted of 45 voting members and one non-voting member while many other notable figures participated.

=== Asia ===
- China: Chu Hsueh Fan
- India: Shripad Amrit Dange, R.A. Khedgikar, S.K. Pramanik, S. C. C. Anthony Pillai
- Palestine: John Asfour, Bulus Farah, A Rabinovitz

=== Africa ===
- Nigeria: T.A. Bankole
- The Gambia: I.M. Garba-Jahumpa
- Ghana: J.S. Annan
- Sierra Leone: I. T. A. Wallace-Johnson
- South Africa: F.R. Swan

=== Europe ===
- Belgium: Jean Brodier, Joseph Bondas, Walter Schevenels
- Bulgaria: T.L. Pranov
- Cyprus: Andreas Ziartides
- Czechoslovakia: Josef Kosina
- Finland: Erkki Härmä
- France: Benoît Frachon, Albert Gazier, Louis Saillant
- Iceland: Brynjólfur Bjarnason
- Ireland: Gilbert Lynch
- Italy: Giovanni Canini
- Netherlands: C.J. Van Lienden
- New Zealand: Alec Croskery
- Norway: Ingvald Haugen, Konrad Nordahl
- Soviet Union: Vasili Kuznetsov, E.I. Sidorenko, Mikhail Tarasov
- Spain: Amaro del Rosal
- Sweden: Gunnar Andersson
- United Kingdom: Walter Citrine, Ebby Edwards, Lincoln Evans, George Isaacs, Herbert Morrison
- Yugoslavia: Đuro Salaj

=== North America ===
- Canada: Pat Sullivan, James Ewart McGuire
- Cuba: Angel Cofiño
- Jamaica: Ken Hill, Una Marson
- United States: Sidney Hillman, Philip Murray, Reid Robinson, R. J. Thomas

=== Oceania ===
- Australia: Ernie Thornton

=== South America ===
- Columbia: Bernardo Medina
- Uruguay: Luis Gonzalez

Unknown: B. Goodwin, B. Locker, Jacobus Oldenbroek and Vicente Lombardo Toledano
