= Jewish Communist Party (Poalei Zion) =

Jewish Communist Party (Poalei Zion) Еврейская коммунистическая партия (Поалей-Цион) ייִדישע קאָמוניסטישע פּאַרטיי (פּועלי־ציון)
- Founded: 1919
- Dissolved: 1922
- Split from: Jewish Social Democratic Labour Party (Poalei Zion)
- Merged into: Russian Communist Party (Bolsheviks)
- Youth wing: Jewish Communist Youth Union
- Ideology: Communism
- Political position: Far-left
- International affiliation: Jewish Communist Union (Poalei Zion)

The Jewish Communist Party (Poalei Zion) (Yiddish: ייִדישע קאָמוניסטישע פּאַרטיי (פּועלי־ציון); Russian: Еврейская коммунистическая партия (Поалей-Цион), romanized: Evreĭskaia kommunisticheskaia partiia (Poaleĭ-Tsion), abbreviated EKP) was a political party in Russia, active from 1919 to 1922. The party was formed at a conference of communist dissident fractions of the Jewish Social Democratic Labour Party (Poalei Zion), held in Gomel 10–15 August 1919. Members of the party were nick-named 'EKOP-ists'. It was affiliated to the Jewish Communist Union (Poalei Zion).

== History ==
EKP argued in favour of a merger with the Bund, to form a Jewish section of the Communist International. The proposed Jewish Comintern section would work under the aegis of the national communist party in each country, apart from Palestine. EKP was fiercely opposed to the Yevsektsiya, the Jewish Section of the Russian Communist Party (Bolsheviks).

The II All-Russian conference of the EKP was held in July 1920 in Kharkov. The IV Congress of was held in August 1921 and the III All-Russian conference was held 1–2 December 1922 in Moscow.

The party was represented in the Council for Propaganda and Action of the Peoples of the East of the Communist International through Zajma Ostrovsky, who participated in the 1920 Congress of the Peoples of the East, held in Baku, Azerbaijan (part of Soviet Russia).

In its later phase the party passed through severe internal disputes. The fact that the Komfarband merged with RCP(b) in March 1921 weakened the case for the formation of a Jewish Comintern section and sparked a debate on RCP(b)-EKP merger within the party.

In 1922 the party merged into the Russian Communist Party (Bolsheviks) and many of its members became involved in the Yevsektsiya.

=== In Baku ===
The EKP occupied a strong position in Baku after the arrival of the 11th Soviet Red Army. The Jewish population of the city grew considerably in those years because of the pogroms committed by the White Army in Ukraine, Belarus and Russia that led many Jews to find shelter in Azerbaijan, a country without an antisemitic tradition. The fact that the Jewish population had grown up to 13,700 persons helped the EKP (as well as the Communist Bund, the Yevsektsiya and the Zionist parties) to enlarge its membership in the area. The EKP promoted many cultural activities and struggled for the eliminination of illiteracy, in particular among the Mountain Jews. In 1921 the betsalel circles were opened in Baku. In those places it was possible to organize literature and Jewish drama courses.

== Organization ==
The party was led by a Central Committee and a Politburo. The organ of the Central Committee of EKP was Nakanune ('Накануне'). In Ukraine, the party Central Committee had a Right-bank Bureau (Pravbirou) and a Left-bank Bureau. The Belorussian EKP was headed by a Chief Committee. Moreover, the party had a Caucasus Regional Committee. The youth wing of the party was called Jewish Communist Youth Union.

EKP maintained a party school in Kharkov, named after Ber Borochov.

=== Youth wing ===
The party additionally operated a youth wing, the Jewish Communist Youth Union (Russian: Еврейский коммунистический союз молодежи), often abbreviated as Evkommol. The first All-Russian convention of the organization took place 23–27 January 1920 in Moscow. The All-Russian conference of the organization took place 1–4 September 1920 in Kharkov. The organization published Evkommol ('Евкоммол').

Evkommol fiercely opposed the Yevsektsiya, the Jewish Section of the Russian Communist Party (Bolsheviks).

== Local organs of the party ==
- Minsk: Budil'nik (in Yiddish)
- Poltava: Ekapistskaia khronika (in Yiddish)
- Kyiv: Kommunisticheskaia mysl΄ (in Yiddish)
- Moscow: Kommunisticheskaia mysl΄ (in Yiddish)
- Nezhin: Kommunisticheskoe slovo (organ of the Pravbiuro)
- Yaroslavl: Na strazhe
- Avangard (organ of the Chief Committee of the Belorussian EKP)
- Molot (organ of the Chief Committee of the Belorussian EKP)

== See also ==
- Jewish Communist Party — Poalei Zion, section of the Palestine Communist Party
- Mifleget Poale Zion VeHaHugim HaMarksistim beEretz Yisrael
- Poale Zion
