= Socialist Workers Party (Mandatory Palestine) =

Socialist Workers Party מפלגת הפועלים הסוציאליסטית
- Founded: 1919
- Dissolved: 1921
- Split from: Poale Zion
- Merged into: Palestinian Communist Party; Communist Party of Palestine
- Ideology: Communism
- Political position: Left-wing

The Socialist Workers Party (Hebrew: מפלגת הפועלים הסוציאליסטית, romanized: Mifleget HaPoalim HaSotzialistit, Hebrew abbreviation מפ״ס, 'Mops', English abbreviation 'MPS') was a political party in the British Mandate of Palestine from 1919–1922. Its followers were known as Mopsim. The third party congress decided to change to name of the party to Jewish Communist Party — Poalei Zion, section of the Palestine Communist Party (Yiddish abbreviation 'JKP-PKP').

The party was a minor force in the political life of the Yishuv in Palestine, and was torn by internal divisions between the labour Zionism of Poale Zion and the proletarian internationalism of the Communist International. The party was the precursor of the Palestine Communist Party, and of the current Communist Party of Israel.

== Foundation ==
On September 25, 1919, Poalei Zionists in Haifa, Jaffa and Jerusalem met and decided to relaunch a Poalei Zion party in Palestine (the rightist sections of the Palestine Poalei Zion had formed a separate party, Ahdut HaAvoda in March same year). The founding congress of the Socialist Workers Party was held on October 17–19, 1919 in Jaffa. In a few weeks, the new party had a membership of approximately 110–120 persons.

== Mass work ==
Trade union work played a central role in the MPS. At the second conference of the Zionist Railway Workers' Union, held in Jaffa March 6–7, 1920, MPS was the largest bloc with seven delegates. In order to counter the MPS influence in the union, Ahdut HaAvoda and Hapoel Hatzair joined forces. Together the two parties had eight delegates.

The party ran a 'Borochov Club', a social meeting place in Jaffa. At the club, named after Ber Borochov, left-wing Poalei Zion publications like Avangard of Vienna and Jüdische-Sozialistische Monatschrift from New York City were available.

== Shifts in the party ==
In the latter half of 1920, the party took a rightward turn ideologically. The main theoretician of the party, Yaakov Meiersohn, had left Palestine for Vienna and Soviet Russia. The second party congress was held October 2–4, 1920, in Haifa. At the congress, there were 18 delegates with voting rights, 4 delegates without voting rights and 1 representative of the World Union of Poalei Zion. The delegates represented approximately 300 party members, from local branches in Haifa, Jaffa, Jerusalem, Petach Tikva and amongst road construction workers in Tiberias and Alexandria.

On November 2, 1920, the name of the party was changed to Jewish Socialist Workers Party — Poalei Zion (Hebrew: מפלגת פועלים סוציאליסטית עברית, Hebrew abbreviation מפס״ע, 'Mopsi', English abbreviation 'MPSI').

== 1920 Histadrut congress ==
Ahead of the founding congress of Histadrut, held in December 1920, MPSI presented a list of 38 candidates. The list was led by Gershon Admoni, Avraham Revutkzy, Yaakov Sikador, Haim Katz, Mordechai Haldi, Y. Shapira and 'L. Elisha' (Moshe Levin). The election was marred by irregularities, and the MPSI protested the 'fraudulent behaviour' of the dominant parties. Official records gave the MPSI candidate list 303 votes out of 4,433, i.e. 6.8% of the total vote and six delegates. In Jaffa and Tel Aviv, MPSI got 152 out of 782 (19.5%), in Haifa the party got 43 out of 272 votes (16%), in Jerusalem 24 out of 426 votes (5.4%) and in the Galilee 54 out of 1279 votes (4.2%). The remaining 30 votes came from colonies on the West Bank.

At the congress, the MPS delegates argued that membership should be open to Arab workers and that Jewish and Arab proletarians should fight unitedly.

== Third party congress ==
The third party congress was held April 22–25, 1921, in Jaffa. 26 delegates participated, representing local branches in Jaffa, Haifa, Jerusalem, Rehovot, Zikhron Ya'akov, Petach Tikva, Yavne, Sarafend, Tzemah and Kineret, the party branch at the Labour Battalion 'Migdal', the Central Committee and the youth and women's wings of the party. Present were both pro- and anti-Zionist tendencies amongst the delegates.

The third party congress decided to change to name of the party to Jewish Communist Party — Poalei Zion, section of the Palestine Communist Party (Yiddish abbreviation 'JKP-PKP'). In theory, this name denoted that the party was a Jewish national section in a bicommunal Palestinian party. In practice, there was no Arab national section and thus the name change was merely a symbolic gesture at this point.

== 1921 May Day riots ==
During May Day 1921, the party organized a small, unauthorized rally between Jaffa and Tel Aviv. At the rally, party had a banner in Yiddish, calling for the creation of a 'Soviet Palestine'.

Fistfights erupted as the JKP-PKP rally and the larger, authorized Histadrut rally clashed with each other. Police forces drove the communist rallyists out into the sand dunes between Tel Aviv and Jaffa. Later during the day, violence between Arab and Jews erupted in the city, partly as a consequence of the earlier JKP-PKP/Histadrut clash; the firing of rifles into the air by the police led to rumours that Arabs had been killed. Two party members were killed whilst defending a Jewish neighbourhood.

After these events, the party was weakened. The British authorities blamed the party for the riots. Also, the intention of the party of forming Jewish-Arab class unity became more difficult as communal tension heightened. The party found itself politically isolated, as polarization between Zionist and Arabic national aspirations aggravated. The party received harsh criticism from Zionists for its role in the May Day clash. The right-wing Zionist leader Ze'ev Jabotinsky accused the party of 'unforgivable treachery' a few days after the riots.

Moreover, the British authorities began deporting party cadres. Fifteen party activists had to leave Palestine. The 4th congress of the Communist International, held in 1922, condemned the deportations and the cooperation of Histadrut in facilitating them.

== Split ==
In 1922, the party was divided into two: The pro-Zionist Palestinian Communist Party and the anti-Zionist Communist Party of Palestine.

== See also ==
- Category:Socialist Workers Party (Mandatory Palestine) politicians
