= General Federation of Independent Unions =

The Federation of Independent & Democratic Trade Unions & Workers' Committees in Palestine, representing 50,000 workers, was established in reaction to a lack of democracy within traditional Palestinian trade union federations. Through the efforts of independent labor activists and the Democracy and Workers' Rights Center (DWRC), hundreds of independent workers' committees have conjoined into the Independent Workers' Committees Federation since 2004, holding their first conference in 2007.

== Significance ==
Existing large-scale trade union federations in Palestine have long since ceased to be democratic according to some observers; the Fateh-dominated Palestinian General Federation of Trade Unions (PGFTU) has not had elections since 1981. In 2007 building criticism of the PGTFU culminated in the official institution of the Federation of Independent and Democratic Trade Unions & Workers' Committees in Palestine, representing over 50,000 male and female workers in independent, democratically elected unions and workers' committees across the West Bank and Gaza. Mohammad Al-Arouri, formerly of the PGFTU, is a main coordinator of the new federation.

== Clashes with the PGFTU ==
In 2005 the PGFTU sent a letter to the International Federation of Workers' Education Associations (IFWEA) alleging that "the so-called Independent Workers' Committees are coordinating with the Democracy and Workers' Rights Center headed by Mohammed Dahman2[ii] as well as Hamas movement and the Palestinian National Initiative headed by Mustafa Barghouthi." Such charges, which could lead to imprisonment of those involved, were heavily contested by DWRC.

== See also ==
- Palestinian General Federation of Trade Unions
