= HeHalutz =

Jewish youth movement

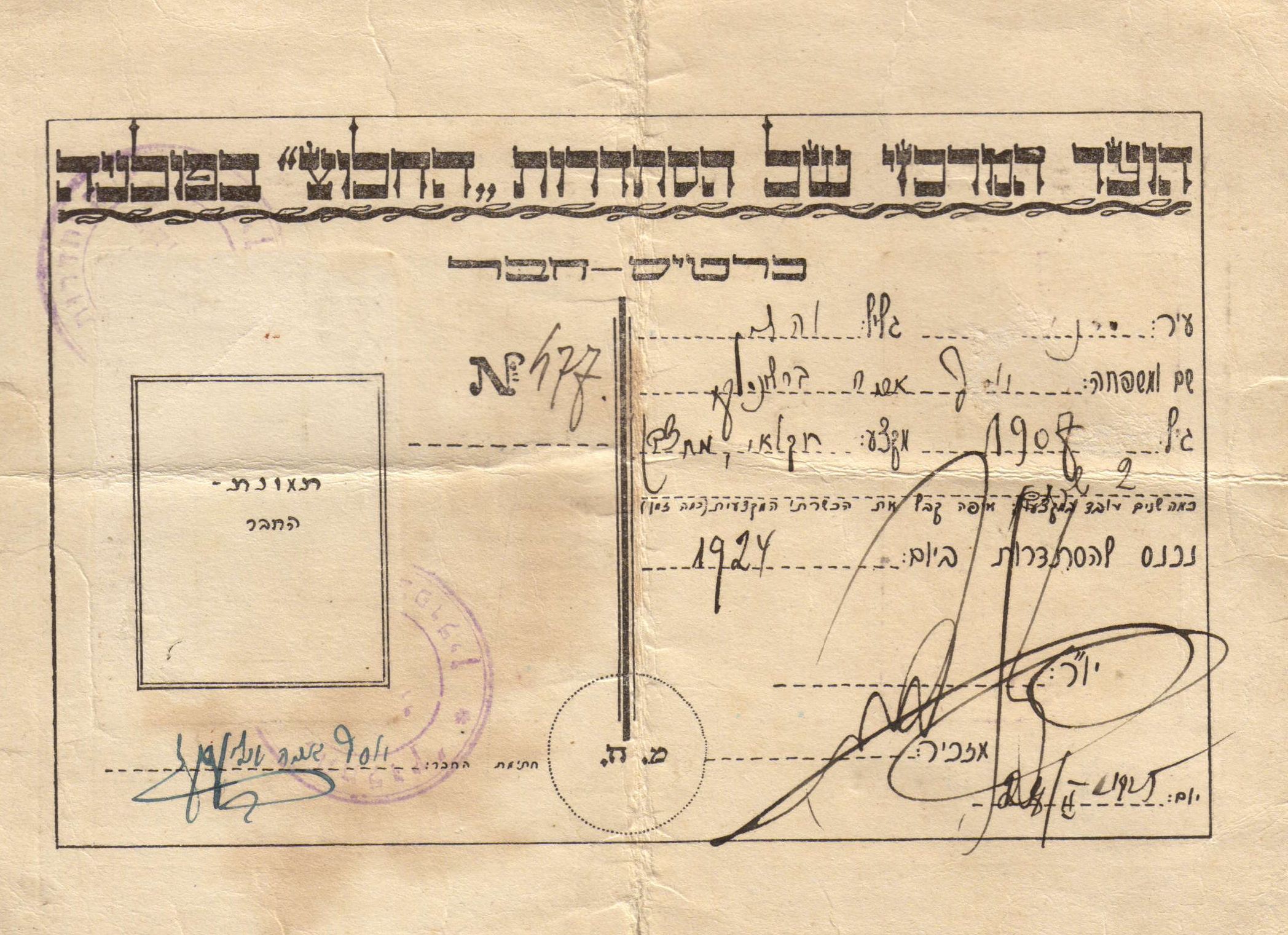
Polish HeHalutz membership card, 1924

HeHalutz or HeChalutz (Hebrew: הֶחָלוּץ, lit. "The Pioneer") was a Jewish youth movement founded in 1905 that trained young people for agricultural settlement in the Land of Israel. It became an umbrella organization of early Zionist youth movements, advocating for a modern Jewish state in the land of Israel.

== History ==
=== Before WWI (1905–1914) ===
HeHalutz was founded by Eliezer Joffe in America in 1905, and about the same time in Russia.

=== First World War (1914–1918) ===
During World War I, HeHalutz branches opened across Europe (including Russia), America and Canada. Leaders of the organization included Yitzhak Ben-Zvi (later the second president of the State of Israel), and David Ben-Gurion (later the first Prime Minister of Israel) in America, and Joseph Trumpeldor in Russia.

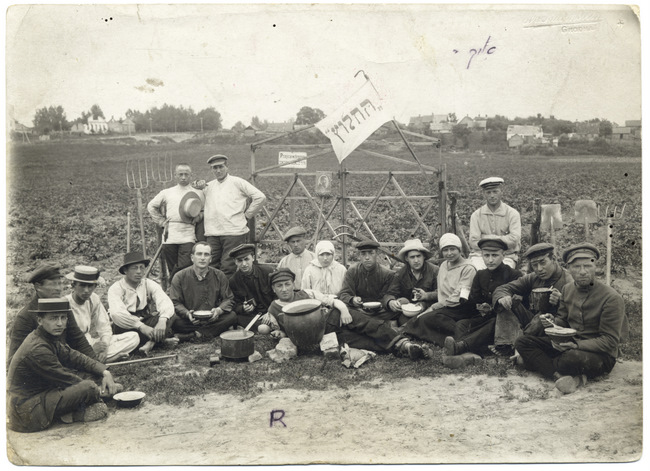
Members of a HeHalutz agricultural group, sharing a meal in a field, Grodno, 1920

Ben-Gurion was living in Jerusalem at the start of the First World War, where he and Ben Zvi recruited forty Jews into a Jewish militia to assist the Ottoman army. Despite this, he was deported to Egypt in March 1915. From there he made his way to the United States, where he remained for three years. On his arrival, he and Ben Zvi went on a tour of 35 cities in an attempt to raise a Hechalutz "pioneer army" of 10,000 men to fight on Turkey's side. They succeeded in recruiting 63 volunteers. After the Balfour Declaration of November 1917, the situation changed dramatically and Ben-Gurion, with the interest of Zionism in mind, switched sides and joined the newly formed Jewish Legion of the British Army, leaving to fight the Turks in Palestine.

=== Interbellum (1918–1939) ===
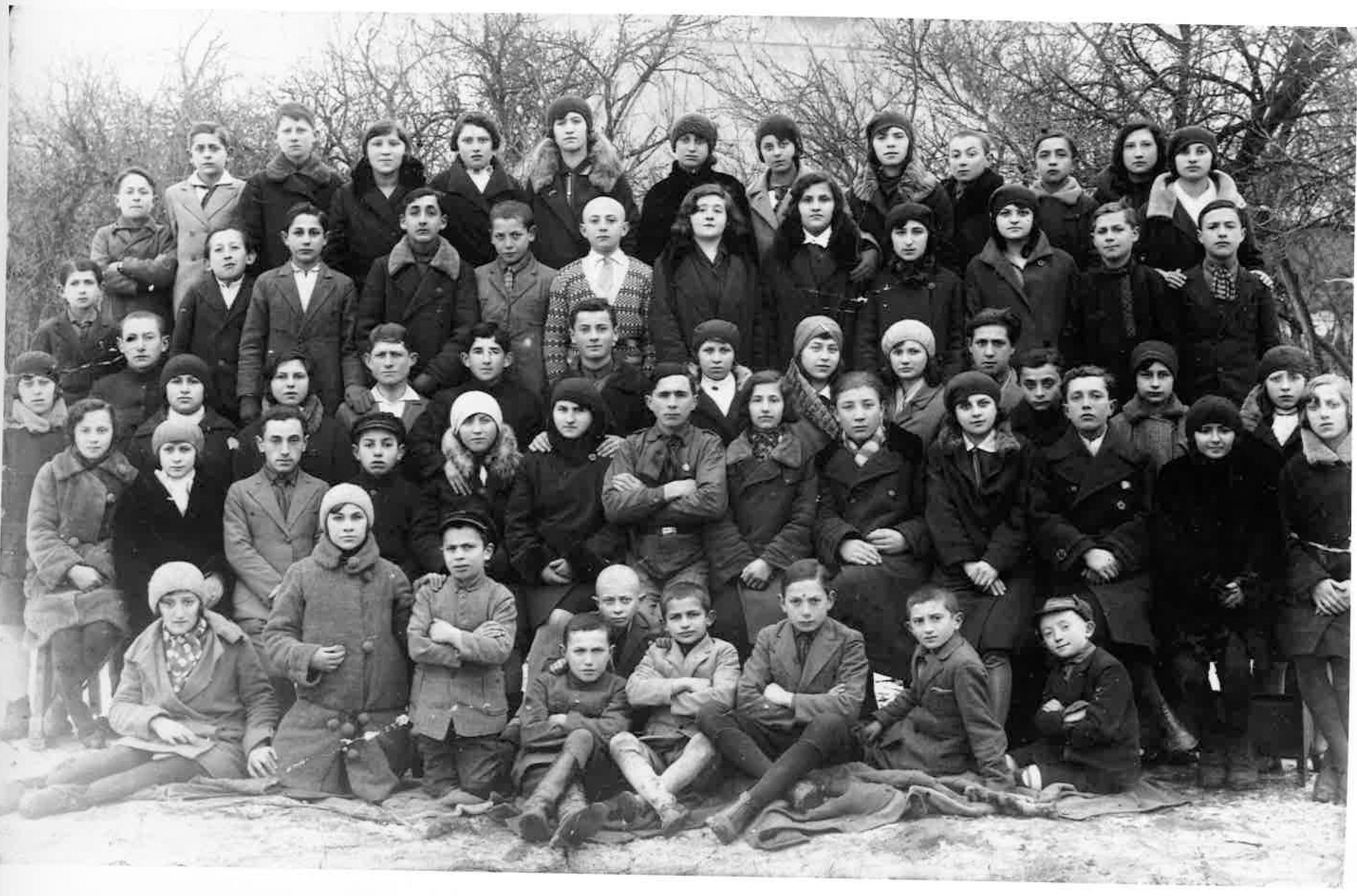
Maciejów, Poland branch of HeHalutz Hatzair, 1930 (Courtesy of the Yossef Karpus Collection at the American Folklife Center)

At its peak, between 1930 and 1935, HeHalutz operated in 25 countries throughout Europe, North Africa, the Middle East, and Northern South America.

==== Soviet Union ====
In 1926, HeHalutz was exiled from the Soviet Union for failing to respond to the "upsurge of internationalism."

==== North America ====
In 1932–1934, Golda Meir, later the prime minister of Israel, was the secretary of the women's chapter of HeHalutz in the United States.

In 1932, the organization established headquarters in New York and twenty branches in cities and towns throughout the United States and Canada. Farms were then established to train members for agricultural work in Palestine. Such farms operated in Cream Ridge and Hightstown, New Jersey; Poughkeepsie, New York; Smithville, Ontario; and Colton, California.

==== Germany ====
In 1933, after Jews were expelled from the workforce in Nazi Germany, HeHalutz farms became the primary framework for vocational training and preparation for emigration. Alisa Fuss lived at a HeHalutz house before making aliyah in 1935.

==== 1939 ====
By the eve of Second World War in 1939, HeHalutz numbered 100,000 members worldwide, with approximately 60,000 having already emigrated (aliyah) to Mandate Palestine, and with 16,000 members in training centers (hakhsharot) for the pioneering life in the Land of Israel.

=== Second World War (1939–1945) ===
During the war and German occupation, Jews in some ghettos in Europe established Hechalutz units, as in Lithuania's Šiauliai Ghetto.

In the Jewish ghetto in Warsaw, Poland, the SS leader who was responsible for the final destruction of the ghetto reported that, during the heroic resistance put up by Jews, "Polish bandits" and Jewish and Polish Communist resistance fighters in 1943: "During this armed resistance the women belonging to the battle groups were equipped the same as the men: some were members of the Chaluzim movement. Not infrequently, these women fired pistols with both hands. It happened time and again that these women had pistols or hand grenades (Polish "pineapple" hand grenades) concealed in their bloomers up [to] the last moment to use against the men of the Waffen SS, Police or Wehrmacht."

=== After WWII ===
By the 1950s, HeHalutz "was absorbed by Hashomer Hatzair, which had always maintained a large degree of autonomy. Nominally, however, the He-Ḥalutz Organization of America still exists."
