= Democracy and Workers' Rights Center =

Palestinian non-governmental non-profit

Coordinates: 25°13′53″N 51°29′4″E

- مركز الديمقراطية وحقوق العاملين
- Founded: 1993
- Type: Non-profit
- Location: Ramallah, Palestine
- Region served: State of Palestine
- Key people: Hasan Barghouthi (Director)
- Website: dwrc.org

The Democracy and Workers' Rights Center (DWRC; Arabic: مركز الديمقراطية وحقوق العاملين) is a Palestinian non-governmental, non-profit organization, not affiliated with any political party. DWRC was established in 1993 by a group of trade unionists, lawyers, academics and political figures in Palestinian society to defend workers’ rights and promote social justice. Founders feature Hassan Barghouthi (General Secretary of the International Federation of Workers' Education Associations in Arab Countries), and Ghassan Khatib (former Planning Minister and longtime journalist). DWRC is centered in Ramallah with a branch office in Gaza City.

== Significance ==
In 2000 the Palestinian President ratified the first Palestinian Labor Law. However, according to DWRC the Labor Law lacked teeth, and DWRC lawyers and organizers acted to work with Palestinian Authority legal experts to introduce amendments; late in 2005, DWRC successfully achieved Palestinian Legislative Council acceptance of an alternative Palestinian Labor Law.

Existing large-scale trade union federations in Palestine have long since ceased to be democratic according to a range of observers; the Fateh-dominated PGFTU has not had elections since 1981. DWRC, as an independent NGO which is not itself a trade union, has been at the forefront of calling the PGFTU to account within the Palestinian media as well as internationally, and has organized hundreds of democratic worker committees, pushing for a fully transparent Palestinian labor movement.

In 2007, DWRC organized the Federation of Independent & Democratic Trade Unions & Workers' Committees in Palestine, launching the first large-scale conference of democratic, independent Palestinian trade unions in decades, representing more than 50,000 female and male workers.
