= Palestinian General Federation of Trade Unions =

PGFTU
- Palestine General Federation of Trade Unions
- الاتحاد العام لنقابات عمال فلسطين
- Founded: 1965
- Headquarters: Nablus, West Bank
- Location: Palestinian territories
- Key people: Shaher Saed, general secretary
- Affiliations: ITUC
- Website: pgftu.org

The Palestinian General Federation of Trade Unions (PGFTU), also called the Palestine General Federation of Trade Unions or Palestinian Trade Union Federation (and, briefly, General Trade Union Federation in Palestine), is a national trade union center in the Palestinian Territories. It has an estimated membership of 290,000, and is affiliated with the International Trade Union Confederation. The union in its current form is historically aligned with Fatah, but other parties have also worked within its organization.

The PGFTU traces its modern history to 1965, and its origins to the Palestinian labour movement of the 1920s. Its current general secretary is Shaher Saed, who has held the position for many years. The PGFTU has not held open elections since 1981, for which it has been criticized by independent unionists as well as PGFTU insiders.

A 2007 report in al-Jazeera indicates that the PGFTU receives most of its funding from Saudi Arabia, Syria and Egypt, as well as from organisations such as the Red Cross. Saed argues in the same report that his union has aided more than 250,000 Palestinians with both work and financial support.

== History ==
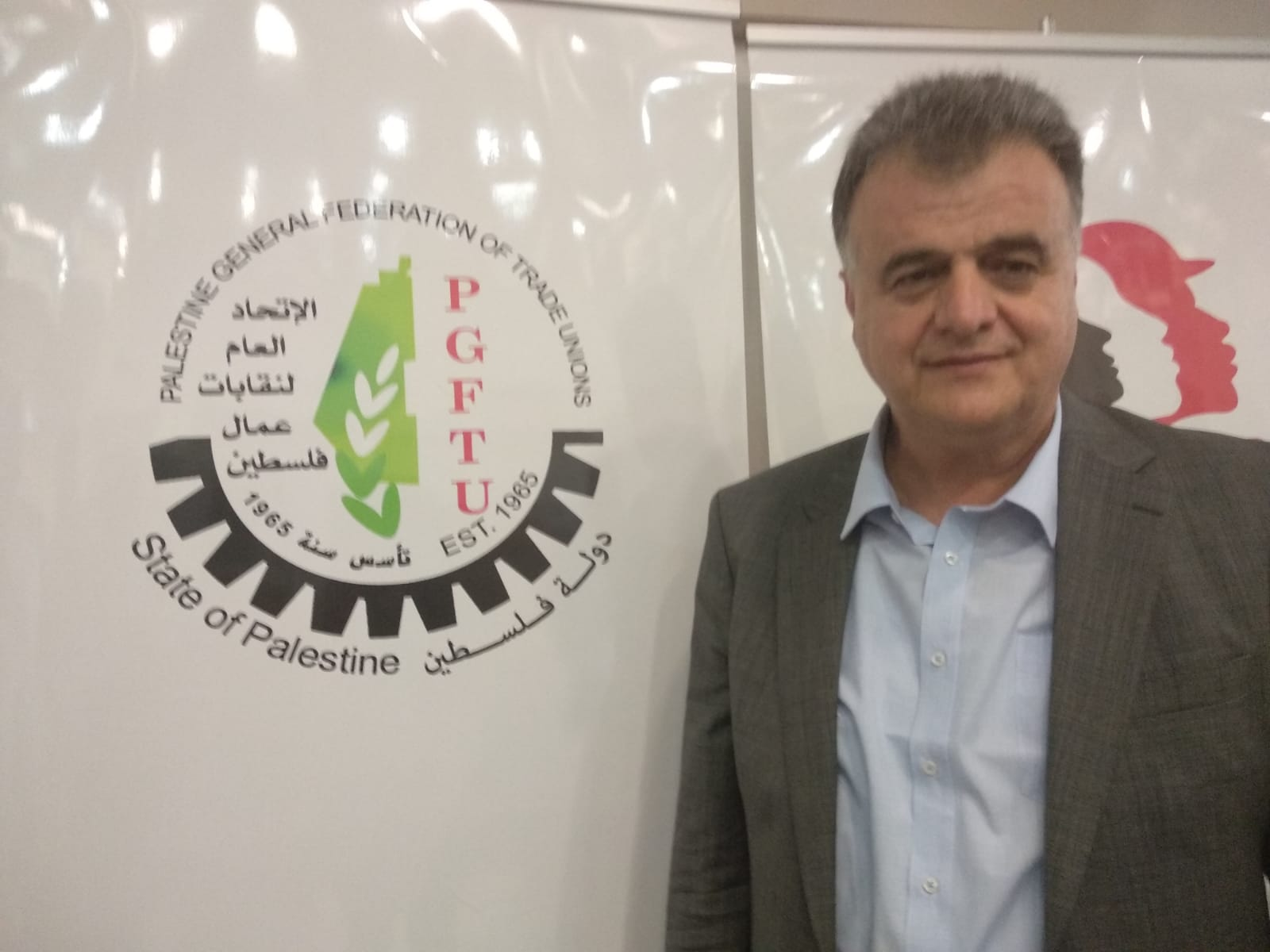
Shaher Saed, general secretary of the PGFTU

=== Early years and the First Intifada ===
The early years of the PGFTU were marked by fragmentation and political division. As'ad Ghanem has written that the West Bank General Federation definitively seceded from its parent Jordanian body in 1969. A new General Federation of Palestinian Labour Unions was established in 1973, due in large part to the efforts of the Communist Party, but it was not particularly successful and split into rival factions in 1981. After this period, unions aligned with Fatah, the Popular Front for the Liberation of Palestine, the Democratic Front for the Liberation of Palestine and Communists all claimed the name "General Federation" for themselves. There were also regional divisions, as separate union organizations developed in the West Bank, Gaza, and around the exiled leadership of the Palestine Liberation Organization (PLO).

Ghanem has argued that these rival "General Federations" did not function as effective labour unions during this period, and that internal elections came to an end after 1981. This situation continued into the period of the First Intifada, and several rival groups were still claiming the name "General Federation" in the period just before the Gulf War.

A movement toward unity began in 1990, as federations aligned with the Palestinian People's Party (formerly Communists) and Popular Front merged with the Fatah-aligned group. The Democratic Front joined at the end of 1993. Fatah emerged as the dominant force within the union after the merger.

In September 1990, the West Bank federation reported that 8,500 Palestinians, who were either expelled from the Gulf States or left because their work contracts were not renewed, had crossed into the West Bank from Jordan since Iraq's invasion of Kuwait the previous month. (Many Palestinian workers faced discrimination in Gulf countries in this period, after the PLO declared its support for the invasion.) Shaher Saed, described as the federation's General Secretary, complained that the problem of finding employment for these workers was compounded by the growing number of Palestinians who had lost their jobs to recent immigrants from the Soviet Union to Israel. He called for economists to develop constructive projects within Palestine, and for Palestinian workers to be allowed to return to the Gulf States. The federation reaffirmed its support for the PLO in the same period. When the Gulf War began in January 1991, Sa'ad complained that many Palestinian workers were unable to purchase food due to Israeli curfews that prevented them from reaching their workplaces.

=== Oslo process ===
Saed endorsed the Oslo Peace Process in 1993, and sent a public letter condemning violence and terror to Haim Haberfield, secretary-general of the Israeli Histadrut. In the same letter, Saed also called for Israel to return tax and pension money taken from workers in the occupied territories, which he said amounted to $27 billion. In response, Haberfield indicated that he too supported the peace process and called for an end to regional violence.

The return of the exiled Palestinian leadership to the West Bank and Gaza after the signing of the Oslo Accords brought about a change in the PGFTU's structure. Shaher Saed was confirmed as its General Secretary and led its operations in the West Bank, while Rasem Biyari became its second-in-command and oversaw operations in Gaza. Nina Sovich has argued that the PGFTU was unable to develop an effective internal organization after this period, and was hindered by a rivalry between Saed and Haidar Ibrahim, the general secretary of the General Union of Palestinian Workers.

The PGFTU and Histadrut reached a number of agreements during the Oslo years. In November 1994, the Histadrut agreed to transfer $6–7 million (NIS) to Palestinian unions in Gaza and the West Bank over two years. In February 1997, the Histadrut and PGFTU signed an agreement to allow Palestinian workers to sue in Israeli courts for income losses caused by closures. Similar arrangements were agreed to on other occasions. In 2000, Nina Sovich wrote an article arguing that the PGFTU had not succeeded in protecting the rights of Palestinian workers in Israel.

The PGFTU organized a protest against an extended Israeli blockade on Gaza in early 1996, arguing that it was unfairly targeting Palestinian workers. When the Israeli borders were closed again in late 1996 following an outbreak of violence, the PGFTU reported that the resulting unemployment had reached 55% in the West Bank and 70% in Gaza.

=== Post-Oslo ===
Conflict with Israel

The PGFTU staged a sit-in at the Ain al-Hilweh refugee camp in February 2001, after the breakdown of the Oslo process, to promote the right of Palestinian refugees to return to Israel. In January of the following year, Saed called on the European Union to stop importing goods from Israel until its forces withdrew from the Palestinian territories. A subsequent report from the International Confederation of Free Trade Unions indicated that the federation's normal union activities were again suspended due to ongoing violence, and that the PGFTU was focusing its efforts on job creation strategies and providing assistance to the poor.

In September 2002, the PGFTU accused the Israeli army of executing four Palestinian workers without provocation outside a Hebron settlement. The army said the men had intended to attack the settlement. In November 2002, a representative of the PGFTU accused the Israeli government of uprooting thousands of Palestinian-owned olive trees to make way for its separation wall between Israel and the West Bank, which the federation later estimated could cost 52,000 Palestinian jobs. In 2005, the PGFTU called for the international community to engage in a campaign of Boycott, Divestment and Sanctions against Israel.

The PGFTU strongly condemned Israel's military actions in Gaza and Lebanon in 2006. Two years later, the federation called for an international boycott of celebrations commemorating Israel's sixtieth anniversary.

A division of the Israeli army broke into the PGFTU's Ramallah office on July 4, 2007. Shaher Saed subsequently informed al-Jazeera that he had not been informed of the reasons for the raid, and complained that several filing cabinets and computers had been destroyed. Israeli authorities said that the raid had taken place "in order to protect the citizens of Israel", and denied that equipment was damaged.

Work with the Histadrut

The PGFTU sent a letter to the leader of the Histradrut in April 2007, arguing that both unions "must emphasise our mutual need for peace in our two societies, for the benefit both of workers and because peace will reflect stability". This occurred against the backdrop of improved conditions between Israel and the Palestinian Authority, following a split between the governments of the West Bank and Gaza.

Condemnation of 9/11

The PGFTU condemned the terrorist attacks on New York City and Washington on September 11, 2001. Saed described the attacks as an "action against humanity and peace", and gave his "condolences to the American people and their families, the victims of this cowardly and shocking event."

=== Conflict with Hamas ===
The PFGTU became a target in the conflict between Fatah and Hamas in Gaza in early 2007. Rasem Biyari's Gaza home was hit by a rocket attack in January 2007, and Shaher Saed later told al-Jazeera that Hamas had made three assassination attempts against Biyari during the conflict.

Hamas-aligned militants occupied the PGFTU's Gaza headquarters in July 2007, removed all of the existing slogans and flags, and raised a Hamas flag over the building. According to a statement issued by the PGFTU, the militants then ordered the union's staff to discuss how they were going to operate under Hamas rule. Saed called for Hamas to return the building to PGFTU control, and expressed concern that the conflict could prevent 200,000 workers from receiving health insurance benefits.

Azzam Tamimi of the London-based Institute of Islamic Political Thought questioned the legitimacy of Sa'ad's remarks in a 2007 interview, describing them as part of a "propaganda war" between Hamas and Fatah. He said, "The PGFTU is a Fatah organisation ... Fatah, in the West Bank, has been destroying offices of Hamas. Now, Fatah is trying to say that Hamas is trying to do exactly the same in Gaza. Which from my sources, seems to be untrue." Saed himself was briefly taken prisoner by militants aligned with Fatah in 2007, and was accused of supporting Hamas. A Fatah politician later said that the incident was a mistake, and that Sa'ad had received an apology.

In March 2008, the five-story Gaza headquarters of the PGFTU were destroyed by F-16 missiles in an Israeli air raid.

== Criticism ==
The PGFTU has been heavily criticized by insiders such as Muhammad Al-Arouri, former head of the PGFTU legislative unit until his dismissal in 2005. The head of the GFTU in 1982, Mahmud Ziyada—a friend of Al-Arouri and a unionist imprisoned for a total of four years during the Israeli crackdown on trade unions around the time of the First Intifada—resigned in protest over the lack of democratic elections; (today Ziyada is with the Democracy and Workers' Rights Center). Bassim Khoury of the Palestinian Authority raised similar concerns over the failure of the PGFTU to represent workers, decades later in 2007.

Since 1993, independent unionists at the Democracy and Workers' Rights Center (DWRC) have asserted that many Palestinian workers regard the PGFTU as too closely aligned with Fatah and lacking in internal democracy and transparency. In a 2007 press release carried by the Advocacy Project, the DWRC noted that internal elections had not been held in decades. These critiques have been supported by scholars Joost Hiltermann, Nina Sovich and Sos Nissen, who argue that the PGFTU has long been dominated by political factions and has in turn failed to provide effective representation for workers.

Through independent labor activists' and DWRC's efforts, hundreds of independent workers' committees have conjoined into the Independent Workers' Committees Federation since 2004. In 2005 the PGFTU sent a letter to the International Federation of Workers' Education Associations (IFWEA) charging that DWRC's Gaza head Mohammad Dahman "obtains funds from Norway and the Europeans and was arrested by the [Palestinian] Authority several times because of subversion against the [Palestinian] Authority and its leaders," and furthermore alleging that "the so-called Independent Workers' Committees are coordinating with the Democracy and Workers' Rights Center headed by Mohammed Dahman2[ii] as well as Hamas movement and the Palestinian National Initiative headed by Mustafa Barghouthi." Such charges, which could lead to Dahman's imprisonment, were heavily contested by DWRC.

In 2007 building criticism of the PGTFU culminated in the creation of the Federation of Independent & Democratic Trade Unions & Workers' Committees in Palestine, representing over 50,000 male and female workers in independent, democratically elected unions and workers' committees across the West Bank and Gaza. Mohammad Al-Arouri, formerly of the PGFTU, is a main coordinator of the new federation.
