= Palestine Communist Party =

Defunct political party

Palestine Communist Party פאלעסטינישע קומוניסטישע פארטיי (Yiddish) الحزب الشيوعي الفلسطيني (Arabic)
- Founded: 1923
- Dissolved: 1948
- Merger of: Palestinian Communist Party; Communist Party of Palestine
- Merged into: Maki
- Ideology: Anti-Zionism; Communism; Secularism
- Political position: Far-left
- International affiliation: Communist International

The Palestine Communist Party (Yiddish: פאלעסטינישע קומוניסטישע פארטיי, Palestinische Komunistische Partei, abbreviated PKP; Arabic: الحزب الشيوعي الفلسطيني, romanized: al-Ḥizb al-Shuyūʿī al-Filasṭīnī) was a communist party in Mandatory Palestine formed in 1923 through the merger of the Palestinian Communist Party and the Communist Party of Palestine. In 1924 the party was recognized as the Palestinian section of the Communist International. In its early years, the party was predominantly Jewish, but held an anti-Zionist position.

== History ==
In 1923 the 'Communist Party of Palestine' and 'Palestinian Communist Party' merged, forming the 'Palestine Communist Party'. Both emerged out of the Jewish Socialist Workers Party (later the 'Jewish Communist Party') in 1921.

=== Palestinian Communist Party (1922) ===
The Palestinian Communist Party (Yiddish: פּאלעסטיניטשע קאמוניסט פארטיי) was a communist party in Mandate Palestine that came about from a split in 1922 of the Jewish Communist Party. The other factions from the split formed the Communist Party of Palestine. A major difference between the two parties was their attitude towards Zionism. The Palestinian Communist Party was open towards some degree of cooperation with Zionists. Both parties were predominantly Jewish.

=== Communist Party of Palestine ===
The Communist Party of Palestine (Yiddish: קאָמוניסט פארטיי פון פּאַלעסטינע) was a communist party in Palestine 1922-1923. It was formed through a split in the Poale Zion which led to the formation of the Jewish Communist Party and the 'Palestinian Communist Party' (1922). A major difference between the two parties was the attitude towards Zionism. The Communist Party of Palestine was more staunch in its condemnation of Zionism, whereas the Palestinian Communist Party was open towards some degree of cooperation with Zionists. The Communist Party of Palestine opposed Zionist settlements in Palestine.

Joseph Berger-Barzilai, co-founder of the Communist Party of Palestine, spent twenty five years in Stalin's prisons and concentrations camps after the purges in 1937.

=== Foundation ===
Although relatively accepting of Zionism, this party already hosted elements that opposed its bourgeois and imperialist character. Before 1923, this was a minority position, however, and, during the first party congress of the PKP, the "party majority ... did not oppose Jewish immigration to Palestine nor did they oppose socialist-Zionist 'construction' of Palestine." In 1923, at the party congress, a position of support was adopted in favour of the Arab national movement as a movement "opposed to British imperialism and denounced Zionism as a movement of the Jewish bourgeoisie allied to British imperialism", a move that won it membership of the Comintern. The Party was also opposed to Zionist settlement in Palestine and to the Histadrut and its Jewish labor policy.

After the Party's split from Left Zionism in the early 1920s, the Party became more concerned with the Arab population of Palestine and the greater Bilad al-Sham. Karl Radek, as head of the Comintern's Eastern department, instructed the PCP that it must "become a party of Arab workers to which Jews can belong." Additionally, the party helped "communists to their north [i.e. in Lebanon and Syria] organize" moving beyond, but not excluding, their Jewish constituency. According to British intelligence sources, the first Arab joined the party in 1924. By 1925 the party had eight Arab members. In that year the party was in contact with the Palestine Arab Workers Society. Simultaneously the party established relations with elite sections of the local Arab society. According to Fred Halliday, many Christian Arabs were attracted towards the party since they, being Orthodox, felt emotional bonds with Russia. Representatives from the party at the League against Imperialism's 1927 conference in Brussels clashed with Poale Zion, forming an anti-Zionist bloc with Arab nationalists from Palestine, Egypt and Syria within the League.

However, when the Comintern made its ultra-left turn in 1928 and denounced cooperation with national bourgeoisies in the colonies, the process of strengthening of the party amongst the Arab population was stalled. In response to the 1929 Palestine riots, the Central Committee of the PCP issued a communique titled 'The Revolt in Palestine,' which characterized the events not as a pogrom, but as an anti-imperialist uprising by the Arab masses. The party argued that the 'Zionist bourgeoisie' and British imperialism were responsible for the violence, calling for a joint Arab-Jewish struggle against British rule.In 1930 the Comintern did yet another sharp turn, urging its Palestinian section to speedily increase the Arab representation amongst its cadres and leaders.

=== 1930s ===
In December 1930, PCP ran in the elections for the Jewish Assembly of Representatives in Mandate Palestine, using a front organization called the Proletarian Party (Harishima Haproletarit). The party failed dismally.

In 1934 Radwan Al Hilu, a Palestinian Arab, was appointed by the Comintern as the secretary general of the party which he held until his resignation from the party in 1943.

During the 1936–1939 Arab revolt, the PCP called for an 'Arab-Jewish Front Against British Imperialism.' While the party supported the revolt's anti-colonial aims, it sought to redirect the conflict away from inter-communal violence and toward a unified class struggle against the British Mandate authorities. Statements from 1936 urged Jewish workers to join Arab workers in a general strike against British policy. The calls attracted some new supporters of the party, such as Alisa Fuss.

=== 1940s ===
PKP propaganda during the Second World War, calling for support of the Red Army and using the Chapaev film poster (1940s)

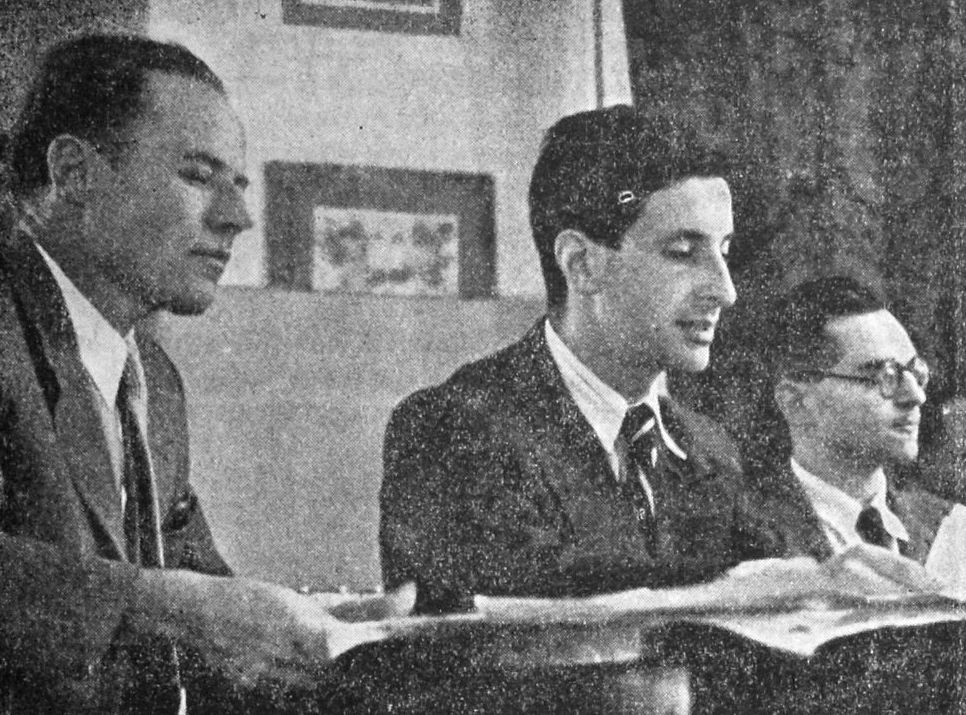
Representatives of the Palestine Communist Party address the United Nations Special Committee on Palestine, July 1947. (L-R): Shmuel Mikunis, Wolf Ehrlich, Meir Vilner.

In 1943 the party split, with the Arab members forming the National Liberation League in 1944. The PCP and NLL both initially opposed the 1947 UN Partition Plan, but accepted it after the Soviet Union endorsed it. The PCP changed its name to MAKEI, the Communist Party of Eretz Israel, after endorsing partition in October 1947. This was the first time the communists had used the term 'Eretz Israel' ('Land of Israel') in a party's name. However, it had been a widespread practice in Mandate Palestine to translate 'Palestine' as 'Eretz Israel' when translating into Hebrew. The party still viewed partition as a temporary detour on the road to a binational state. The two parties maintained contact during the 1948 war, and after the war, the NLL merged with Maki (the new name adopted by Maki, meaning the Communist Party of Israel) within the new state's borders.

=== Later 20th century ===
From 1951 the Jordanian Communist Party organized Palestinians in the West Bank while a new Palestinian Communist Organization mobilized members in Gaza City. In 1975 a Palestinian Communist Organization was formed in the West Bank as a branch of the Jordanian party. In 1982 it severed ties with Jordan and merged with the organization in Gaza to become the new Palestine Communist Party. This Party later became the Palestinian People's Party. In 1987, it joined the Palestine Liberation Organization.

== See also ==
- Hadash
- Hebrew Communists, a 1945 split that later merged with the PCP in 1948 before splitting again in 1949
- Maki (historical political party)
- Maki (political party)
- National Liberation League in Palestine
- Palestinian Communist Party (1982 foundation)
- Revolutionary Communist League (Mandatory Palestine)
- Semitic Action
- Socialist Workers Party (Mandatory Palestine)

== Bibliography ==
- Bashear, S. (1980). Communism in the Arab East: 1918-28. Jerusalem Studies. Garnet Publishing, Limited. ISBN 978-0-903729-55-0.
- Bernstein, Deborah (2000). Constructing boundaries: Jewish and Arab workers in mandatory Palestine. Albany, N.Y: State University of New York Press. ISBN 0-7914-4539-9.
- Beinin, J. (1990). Was the Red Flag Flying There? Marxist Politics and the Arab-Israeli Conflict in Eqypt and Israel 1948-1965. University of California Press. ISBN 978-0-520-07036-3.
- Budayrī, Mūsá (2010) [1979]. The Palestine Communist Party 1919–1948: Arab and Jew in the Struggle for Internationalism. Chicago, Ill: Haymarket Books. ISBN 978-1-60846-072-4.
- Connell, Dan (2001). Rethinking Revolution: New Strategies for Democracy & Social Justice: The Experiences of Eritrea, South Africa, Palestine and Nicaragua. Lawrencevill, NJ: The Red Sea Press. ISBN 1-56902-145-7.
- Kawar, Amal (1996). Daughters of Palestine: Leading Women of the Palestinian National Movement. Albany: SUNY Press. ISBN 0-7914-2845-1.
- Schayegh, Cyrus (2017). The Middle East and the Making of the Modern World. Harvard University Press. ISBN 9780674981096.
- Younis, Mona (2000). Liberation and Democratization: The South African & Palestinian National Movements. Minneapolis: University of Minnesota Press. ISBN 0-8166-3299-5.
- Greenstein, Ran (2009). "Class, Nation, and Political Organization: The Anti-Zionist Left in Israel/Palestine". International Labor and Working-Class History. 75 (1). Cambridge University Press (CUP): 85–108. doi:10.1017/s0147547909000076. ISSN 0147-5479.
