= Histadrut =

National trade union of Israel

- New General Workers' Federation
- הסתדרות העובדים הכללית החדשה نقابة العمّال العامّة الجديدة
- Founded: December 1920; 105 years ago
- Headquarters: Tel Aviv, Israel
- Location: Israel
- Members: 800,000
- Key people: Arnon Bar-David, Chairman
- Affiliations: ITUC
- Website: www.histadrut.org.il

Histadrut, fully the New General Workers' Federation (Note: Hebrew: הסתדרות העובדים הכללית החדשה, romanized: Histadrut Ha'ovdim Haklalit Hachadsha, Arabic: نقابة العمّال العامّة الجديدة, romanized: niqābat al-ʿummāl al-ʿāmmah al-jadīdah) and until 1994 the General Federation of Labour in the Land of Israel, (Note: ההסתדרות הכללית של העובדים בארץ ישראל, HaHistadrut HaKlalit shel HaOvdim B'Eretz Yisrael) is Israel's national trade union center and represents the majority of Israel's trade unionists.

Established in December 1920 in Mandatory Palestine, it soon became one of the most powerful institutions in the Yishuv (the body of Jewish residents in the region prior to the establishment of the state). Today, it has 800,000 members.

== History ==
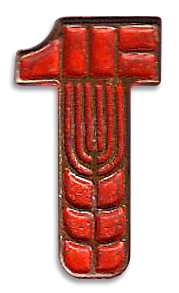
Old symbol of Histadrut

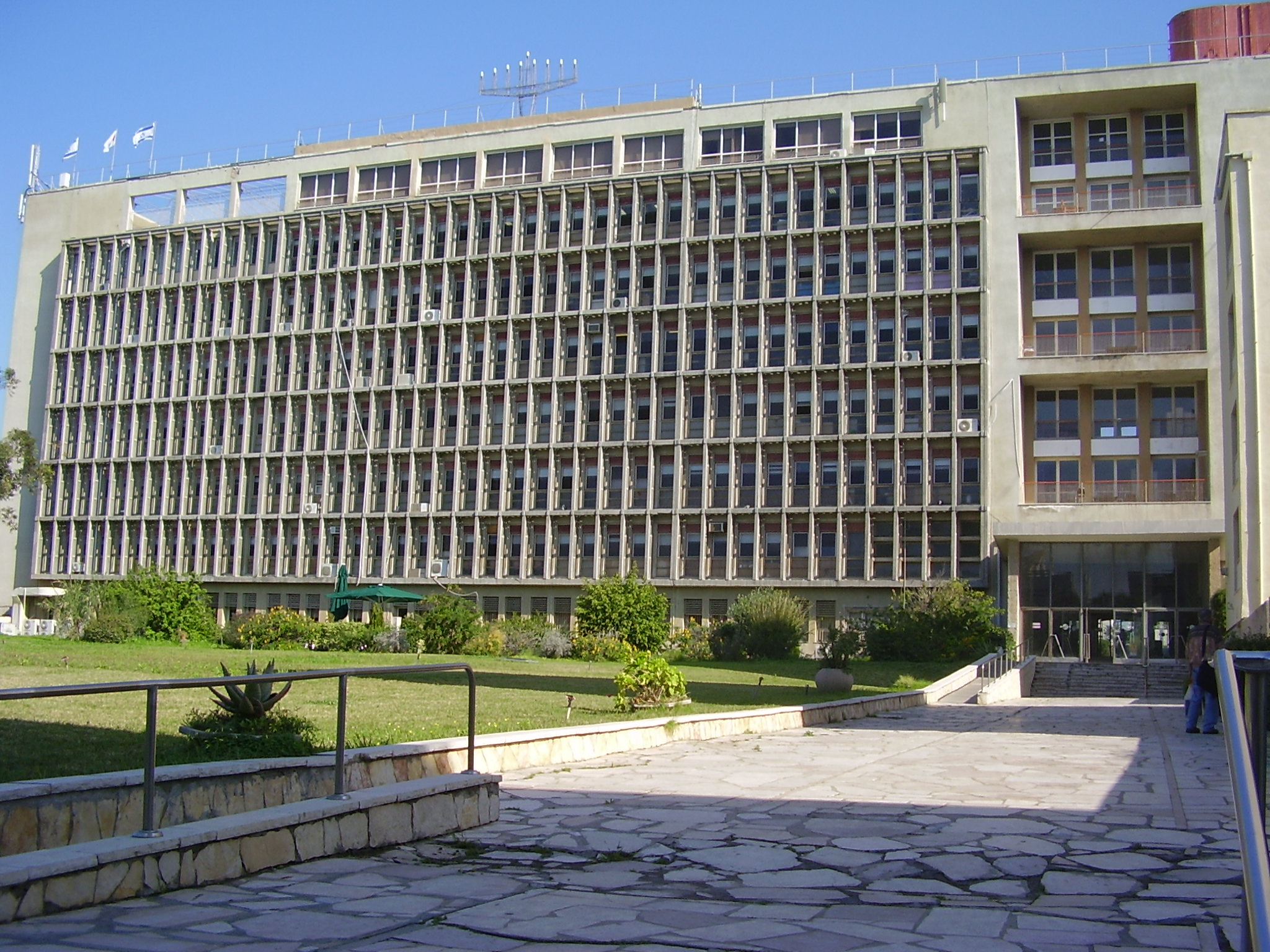
Histadrut headquarters in Tel Aviv

The Histadrut was founded in December 1920 in Haifa to look out for the interests of Jewish workers. Until 1920, Ahdut HaAvoda and Hapoel Hatzair had been unable to set up a unified workers organisation. In 1920, Third Aliyah immigrants founded Gdud HaAvoda and demanded a unified organization for all Jewish workers, which led to the establishment of the Histadrut. At the end of 1921 David Ben-Gurion was elected as Secretary. Membership grew from 4,400 in 1920 and to 8,394 members in 1922.

In 1926 the Histadrut supported Yitzhak Frenkel's art studio in Tel Aviv, through the studio, Frenkel introduced modern art to the region and led to Tel Aviv supplementing Jerusalem as Israel's art centre. The studio closed in 1929. By 1927, the Histadrut had around 22,000 members, accounting for 68% of the Jewish workforce in Mandatory Palestine. In 1939, its membership stood at about 100,000, or about 75% of the Jewish workforce.

=== Labor Zionism ===
More important than the 1917 American Federation of Labor (AFL) resolution recognizing "the legitimate claims of the Jewish people for the establishment of a national homeland in Palestine on the basis of self-government", was the grassroots campaign to finance Histadrut land purchases, infrastructure development and the establishment of farm cooperatives. Jewish garment workers in the US in the early 20th century looked more to local improvements than the promises of Labor Zionism.

The symbolic AFL endorsement of the Balfour Declaration failed to advance Zionist goals on the ground and many Jewish labor leaders were opposed to Zionist endeavors until the 1920 founding of Histadrut began to change their views. Within three years some labor leaders had reversed their positions, calling for moral and financial support for Histadrut. The garment unions Amalgamated Clothing Workers of America and International Ladies Garment Workers Union extended their support to Histadrut.

The Histadrut became one of the most powerful institutions in the state of Israel, a mainstay of the Labour Zionist movement and, aside from being a trade union, its state-building role made it the owner of a number of businesses and factories.

Until Israel began moving away from a socialist economy, the Histadrut, along with the government, owned most of the economy. It was the second largest employer in the country next to the government itself via its many cooperative enterprises. Through its economic arm, Hevrat HaOvdim ("Society of Workers"), the Histadrut owned and operated numerous enterprises, including the country's largest industrial conglomerates, the country's largest bank, Bank Hapoalim, and the country's largest shipping company, ZIM Integrated Shipping Services.

The Israeli services sector was completely dominated by the Histadrut and government, and the Histadrut also largely dominated the public transport, agriculture, and insurance industries. In addition, it owned Clalit Health Services, Israel's largest Kupat Holim, or health insurance and medical services fund. Clalit was the only health fund in the country to accept members without discriminating based on their age or medical situation, but with the condition that they must also be members of the Histadrut labor union. As such, many Israelis were dependent on Histadrut membership for their health insurance. In the mid-1980s, an estimated 70% of the Israeli population was insured by Clalit.

=== Neoliberalism ===
With the increasing liberalization and deregulation of the Israeli economy since the 1980s, the role and size of Histadrut declined. Hyperinflation saddled its business empire with enormous debts, and slow economic growth exposed its inefficiencies. Due to debts, the Histadrut began giving up its business holdings. It lost control of Bank Hapoalim in the aftermath of the 1983 Israel bank stock crisis, when the Israeli government nationalized it along with other major banks.

A notable shift in power took place in 1994 when the Labor Party lost its leadership and governing role in the Histadrut, and a new party named RAM, composed of individuals who had left the Labor Party due to internal power struggles, took charge and began to sell off or eliminate its non-union-related assets and activities, proclaiming that from then on, it would function solely as a trade union.

The most severe blow came when Israel's National Health Insurance Law came into effect in 1995, instituting a national universal health care framework and reorganizing the Israeli healthcare system. Under the law, Clalit Health Services' tie to the Histadrut was severed and Israelis were given a choice in membership between Clalit and the three other Israeli health insurance funds, which were now prohibited from discriminating against applicants for age and medical reasons.

Once an affiliation with the Histadrut was no longer a prerequisite for membership in Clalit, many of its insured dropped their labor union membership, while others switched to other health funds now that age or pre-existing conditions no longer precluded them from joining. This resulted in one of the largest declines in union membership in labor history. The Histadrut's membership plunged almost instantly from 1.8 million (almost 80% of the workforce at the time) to about 200,000 members. The loss of revenue generated from Clalit's health insurance premiums and union dues caused an enormous decline in the Histadrut's resources, and it was forced to sell off valuable real estate assets to survive.

=== Membership ===
Pre-state Histadrut membership
year	members	percent of Jewish workforce
1920	4,415	...
1923	8,394	45
1927	22,538	68
1933	35,389	75
1939	100,000	75
1947	176,000	...

Membership in 1983 was 1,600,000 (including dependents), accounting for more than one-third of the total population of Israel and about 85% of all wage earners. About 170,000 Histadrut members were Arabs (who were admitted to membership starting in 1953). The Histadrut began accepting non-Jewish members in 1959, and they became able to vote in 1965. In 1989, the Histadrut was the employer of approximately 280,000 workers.

The Histadrut managed to recover from its low point in membership and gradually grow in membership. In 2005, it had about 650,000 members. The Histadrut still remains a powerful force in Israeli society and the economy. In 2017 it had 570,000 members and a total of 700,000 workers being employed under collective agreements it had negotiated with employers in the country.

=== 2010s and 2020s ===
Following its support of the 2011 Israeli social justice protests, on February 8, 2012, Histadrut called a general strike in support of lower-paid subcontracted, and unorganized workers, negotiating with both the government and private employers on their behalf, demanding that the subcontracted workers be hired directly and be offered the pay and benefits granted to regular employees. A settlement was announced on Sunday, February 12, which provided for some gains by the subcontractors, but also for a 3-year moratorium on further strikes over subcontractor issues.

In 2016, 27% of the Israeli workforce was a member of this union.

During the 2023 Israeli judicial reform protests the Chairperson of the Histadrut, Anon Bar-David, declared a unionwide strike following the announcement of Prime Minister Benjamin Netanyahu's intention to dismiss Minister of Defense Yoav Gallant. The strike was called off after Netanyahu announced that he would negotiate with the opposition regarding the judicial reform and halt the legislation. Journalist Michael Shemesh alleged that the strike had been coordinated with the Prime Minister's office in order for Netanyahu to be able to apply pressure on his coalition members to halt the legislation.

== Goals ==
The initial aim of the Histadrut was to take responsibility for all spheres of activity of the worker's movement: settlement, defense, trade unions, education, housing construction, health, banking, cooperative ventures, welfare and even culture. The Histadrut took over economic firms operated by the parties, which operated by subcontracting, and their Office of Information, which was expanded into a Labor Exchange. Already after a few months, the Histadrut became the single largest employer in the Yishuv. The Histadrut succeeded in improving worker's rights as e.g. the right to strike was recognised, employers had to motivate dismissal and workers got a place to turn to with their complaints.

In the first year of its existence, the Histadrut lacked central leadership, and many initiatives were taken at the local level. This changed after David Ben-Gurion became appointed in the General Secretariat. Ben-Gurion wanted to transform the Histadrut into a national instrument for the realisation of Zionism. According to Zeev Sternhell Ben-Gurion's exclusive commitment to this goal is illustrated by a December 1922 quote:

[...] Our central problem is immigration ... and not adapting our lives to this or that doctrine. [...] How can we run our Zionist movement in such a way that [... we] will be able to carry out the conquest of the land by the Jewish worker, and which will find the resources to organise the massive immigration and settlement of workers through their own capabilities? The creation of a new Zionist movement, a Zionist movement of workers, is the first prerequisite for the fulfillment of Zionism. [...] Without [such] a new Zionist movement that is entirely at our disposal, there is no future or hope for our activities

Ben-Gurion transformed the Histadrut in a few months. He set up a well-defined hierarchy and reduced the competencies of local workers' councils. He also centralised the collection of membership dues, most of which were formerly used up by local branches.

Absorption of immigration was seen as a very important task of the Histadrut. Providing immigrants with work was often seen as more important than the financial soundness of its operations. The labor leaders saw the failure to absorb immigrants as a moral bankruptcy that was much worse than financial bankruptcy. In 1924 the Histadrut's Office for Public Works collapsed and went bankrupt, and in 1927 the same happened to its successor, the privatised Solel Boneh. In both cases, the Zionist Executive bailed them out and recognised the deficit in the category of "expenses for immigration absorption". The Zionist Executive, sharing the goal of stimulating immigration with the Histadrut, had to do this because besides the Histadrut there was no other organisation in Palestine with the ability to absorb immigrants.

By 1930 the Histadrut had become the central organisation of the Yishuv. It did what the Zionist Executive wanted, but was unable to do: absorb immigrants and organise the agricultural settlement, defense and expansion into new areas of production. According to Tzahor the Histadrut had become "the executive arm of the Zionist movement—but an arm acting on its own". It had become a "state in the making".

According to Tzahor, while the Histadrut focused on constructive action, its leaders did not "abandon fundamental ideological principles". However, according to Ze'ev Sternhell in his book The Founding Myths of Israel, the labor leaders had already abandoned socialist principles by 1920 and only used them as "mobilizing myths".

== Leadership ==
The chairman of the Histadrut today is Arnon Bar-David.

== Criticism ==
The Histadrut had been criticized by European trade unions and international human rights groups over its failure to represent migrant workers, considered to be the most maltreated employees in Israel. In 2009, the Histadrut began accepting memberships of migrant workers.

== See also ==
- 1920 Histadrut election
- 1965 Histadrut election
- Federation of Arab Trade Unions and Labor Societies
- Palestine Arab Workers Society
- Palestinian General Federation of Trade Unions
- Kav LaOved
- Koach LaOvdim
