= 1931 Assembly of Representatives election =

- 5 January 1931
- All 71 seats in the Assembly of Representatives
- Turnout: 67.21%
Party	Leader	Vote %	Seats
Mapai	David Ben-Gurion	43.45	27
Hatzohar	Ze'ev Jabotinsky	16.31	10
Mizrachi–Hapoel HaMizrachi	Yehuda Leib Maimon	8.30	5
General Zionists	Peretz Bernstein	5.74	5
Sephardic Bloc	Bechor-Shalom Sheetrit	4.65	5
Sephardic Revisionists	Benjamin Sasson	4.29	5
Women's Association	Beba Idelson	3.76	3
Sephardic Workers	Avraham Abaas	3.34	4
Yemenite Association	Saadia Kobashi	3.06	3
Poale Zion	Ya'akov Zerubavel	1.82	1
Borochov Workers	Meir Ya'ari	1.80	1
Hashomer Hatzair	Mordechai Shanavi	1.64	1
This lists parties that won seats. See the complete results below.
President of the Jewish National Council before	President of the Jewish National Council after
Pinhas Rutenberg; Independent	Yitzhak Ben-Zvi; Mapai

Elections to the Assembly of Representatives of Mandatory Palestine were held on 5 January 1931. Mapai emerged as the largest party, winning 27 of the 71 seats.

== Electoral system ==
The Jewish National Council reduced the number of seats in the Assembly from 221 to 71, the same number of representatives in the ancient Great Sanhedrin. Voting was open to all naturalized Palestinian citizens who were registered as Jewish and at least 20 years old. To ensure that representation of Sephardic and Yemeni would reflect their share of the Yishuv in Palestine, the National Council agreed to a provision guaranteeing 17 seats to Sephardic and Yemenite candidates, irrespective of their placement on their respective parties' lists. As a result, voter choice was limited by ethnic group; Ashkenazi Jews could only vote for Ashkenazi lists, whilst Sephardic Jews and Yemenite Jews were similarly constrained.

== Campaign ==
A total of 18 lists contested the elections, which were boycotted by Agudat Yisrael in protest at women being allowed to vote and the Yishuv's approach to religious education and ritual slaughter.

== Results ==
Party	Votes	%	Seats
Mapai	21,497	43.45	27
Revisionists	8,069	16.31	10
Mizrachi–Hapoel HaMizrachi	4,107	8.30	5
General Zionists	2,841	5.74	5
Sephardic Bloc	2,301	4.65	6
Sephardic Revisionists	2,121	4.29	5
Women's Association	1,861	3.76	3
Sephardic Workers	1,653	3.34	4
Yemenites	1,515	3.06	3
Poale Zion	902	1.82	1
Borochov Workers	891	1.80	1
Hashomer Hatzair	812	1.64	1
Proletarian List	524	1.06	0
Artisans Group	352	0.71	0
Sephardic Poale Zion	28	0.06	0
Sephardic Borochov Workers	1	0.00	0
Middle Class Association	0	0.00	0
Hitahdut HaIkarim	0	0.00	0
Total	49,475	100.00	71
Valid votes	49,475	98.09	
Invalid/blank votes	961	1.91	
Total votes	50,436	100.00	
Registered voters/turnout	75,046	67.21	
Source: UNISPAL

== Aftermath ==
Following the elections, the Assembly elected the 23-member Jewish National Council, with eleven elected from Mapai, four from the Sephardim Bloc, three from Mizrachi, three from the General Zionists and two from smaller parties. The Revisionists refused to join the council on the basis that the Assembly had refused to pass three resolutions it presented on not taking part in the Legislative Council, overturning the decision of the Jewish Agency to take part in a round table conference or to not send members to negotiate with the British government.
