= Poale Zion =

20th-century Jewish political party and organisation

Poale Zion פועלי ציון
- Leader: Ya'akov Zerubavel
- Founded: 1900
- Dissolved: 1928
- Ideology: Marxism; Labor Zionism; Socialism; Centrist Marxism
- Political position: Left-wing

Poale Zion (Yiddish: פועלי ציון, also romanized Poalei Tziyon or Poaley Syjon, meaning "Workers of Zion") was a movement of Labor Zionist Jewish workers founded in various cities of Poland, Europe and the Russian Empire at about the turn of the 20th century after the Bund rejected Zionism in 1901.

== Formation and early years ==
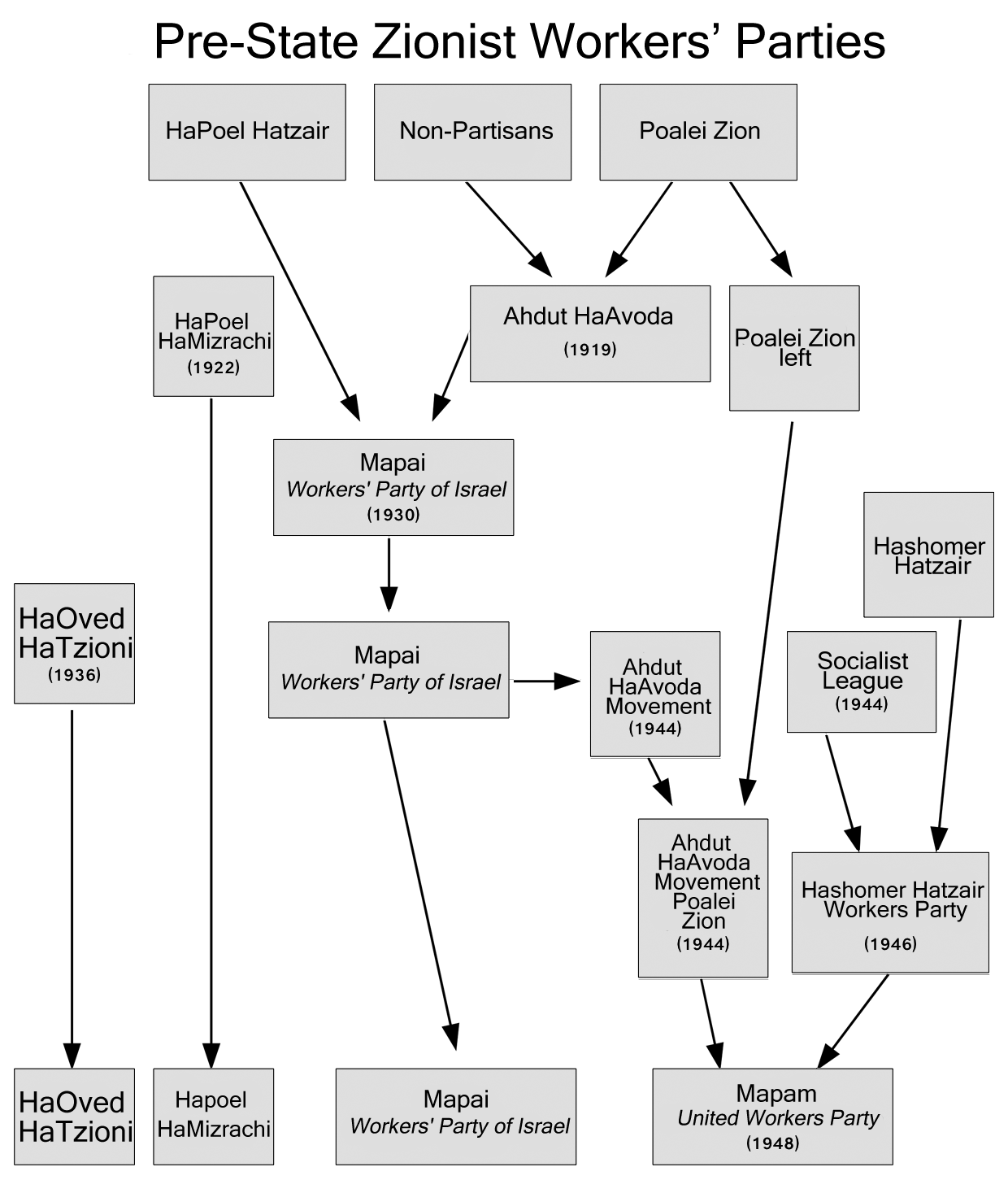
chart of zionist workers parties

=== Ideology ===
The key features of the ideology of early Poale Zion were acceptance of the Socialist view of history with the addition of the role of nationalism, which theorist Ber Borochov, a leader of Poale Zion, believed could not be ignored as a factor in historical development. A Jewish proletariat would come into being in the Land of Israel, according to Poale Zion, and would then take part in the class struggle. These views were set out in Borochov's Our Platform, published in 1906.

=== Early parties and organisations ===
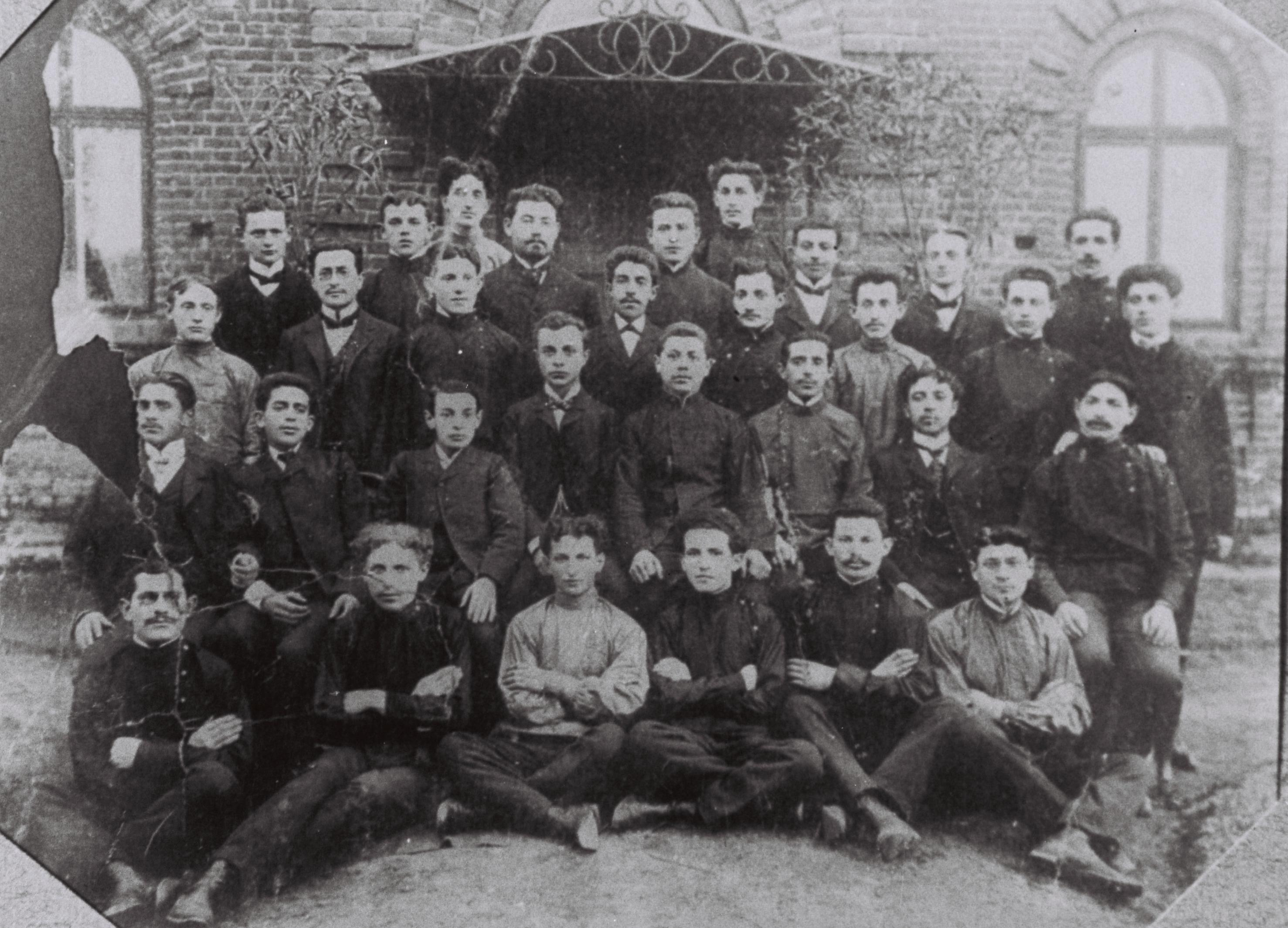
Poalei Zion's "Ezra" group in Płońsk, 1905. David Grün (David Ben-Gurion) in the first row, third on the right.

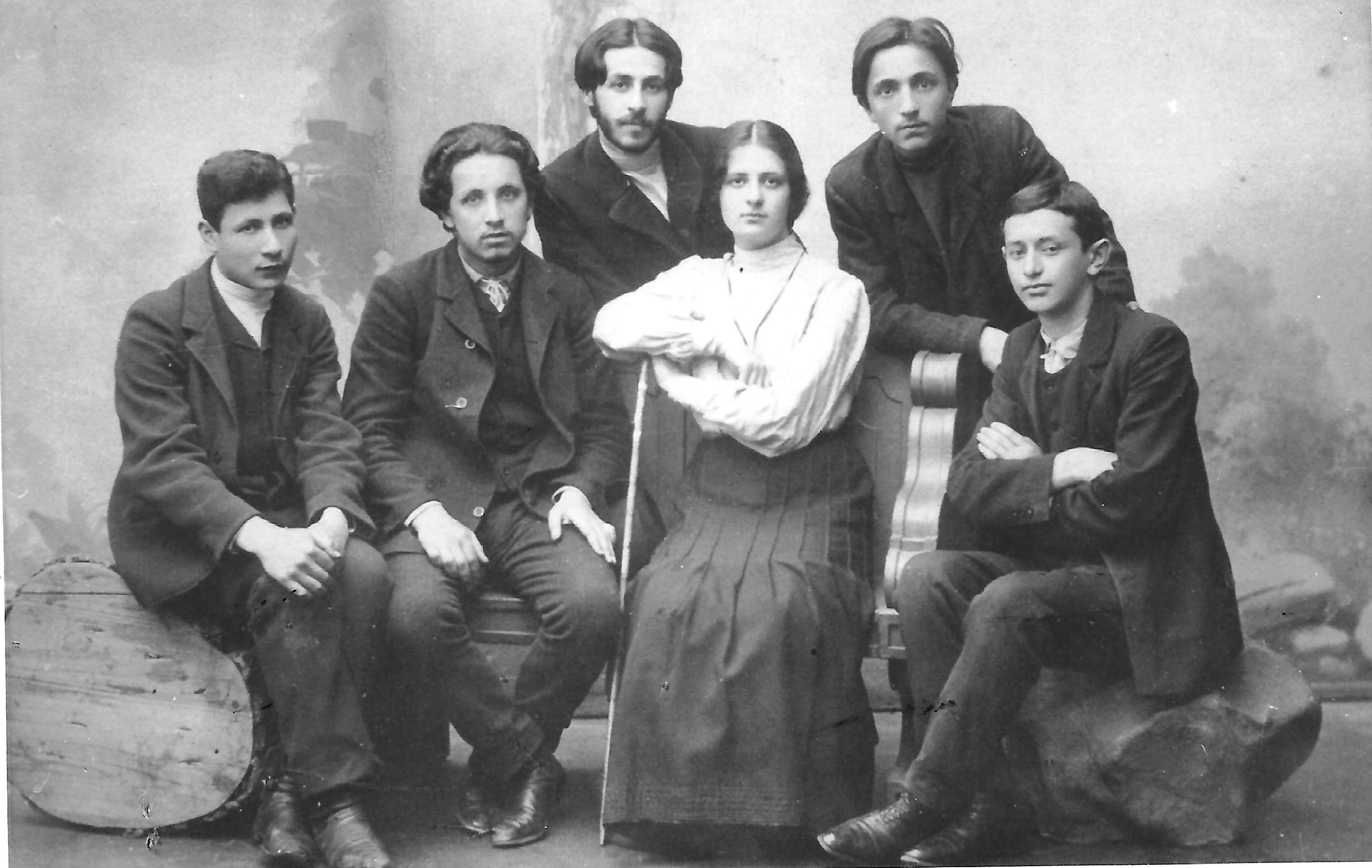
Poalei Zion members in Warsaw, Congress Poland, 1905. Standing, from right to left: Eliezer Salzkin and Yitzhak Tabenkin. Sitting, from right to left: Max Tabenkin, who never emigrated to Israel, Eva Tabenkin, Yosef Zaltzman and Elkana Horowitz.

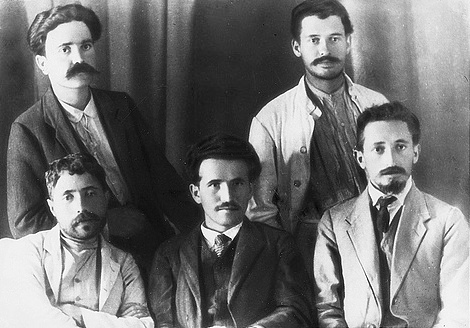
The editorial staff of HaAhdut. Right to left: seated – Yitzhak Ben-Zvi, David Ben-Gurion, Yosef Haim Brenner; standing – Aharon Reuveni (Ben-Zvi's brother), Ya'akov Zerubavel (1910).

Poale Zion parties and organisations were started across the Jewish diaspora in the early 20th century. A branch of Poale Zion came into existence in New York City in 1903. Branches were formed in London and Leeds in 1903/04 and 1905 respectively and on a national basis in 1906. An Austrian group was formed in 1904, and published a newspaper, Yidisher Arbeyter. In November 1905 the Poale Zion (Workers of Zion) Party was founded in Palestine and a month later the Socialist Jewish Labour Party (Poale Zion) was formed in the United States and Canada. In March 1906, the Jewish Social Democratic Labour Party (Poale Zion) was founded in Russia under the leadership of Ber Borochov and Itzhak Ben-Zvi., and other groups were soon formed elsewhere in Europe. A French group was formed, under the leadership of Marc Jarblum, which was influential on the SFIO and its leader Leon Blum. By 1907, the party had 25,000 members in Russia. Jewish Social Democratic Labour Party in Palestine (Poale Zion) (Hebrew: מפלגת הפועלים העברים הסוציאל-דמוקרטים בארץ ישראל (פועלי-ציון)) was a political party, founded in 1906 in Ottoman Palestine. Its founders belonged to a group of Jewish refugees, that had taken part in self-defense during the Gomel pogrom.

With the threat of pogroms, and meeting clandestinely, the Warsaw Poale Zion formed a commando unit (bojówka) with around sixty guns. They were used to "expropriate" funds from well-to-do citizens. In March 1906, the entire Warsaw leadership were amongst the 120 delegates arrested attending the Poale Zion conference in Poltava. Three months later eighteen gunmen raided Warsaw railway station, stealing cash and leaving "a receipt in the name of Warsaw's Poale Zion".

=== Global coordination ===
A World Union of Poale Zion was formed, the first World Congress took place in August 1907 in The Hague. Its second congress in 1909 in Kraków emphasised practical socialist projects in Palestine, further congresses followed in Vienna (1911 and 1920) and Stockholm (1919).

=== Palestine ===
A conference in the name of the Jewish Social-Democratic Workers' Party in the Land of Israel was held in Jaffa between 4–6 October 1906. It was organised by Israel Shochat who over the previous two years had organised an underground group of around 25 Poale Zion followers. About 60 people attended the conference and it was chaired by newly arrived David Ben Gurion.

As a result the following January they produced The Ramleh Program, a Hebrew version of the Communist Manifesto with the added declaration: 'the party aspires to political independence of the Jewish People in this country." After much debate they agreed that there should be segregation of Jewish and Arab economies. It was also agreed that all Poale Zion business should be conducted in Hebrew, though this was not the larger group's policy which held that proceedings should be in Yiddish or Ladino depending on the community. Hebrew was seen as the language of the bourgeoisie. At the time there were 550 active pioneers, Jews working on the land, in the country. In 1910–1911, it was decided that the organisation's journal would be published in Hebrew instead of Yiddish; it was named Achdut (he: אַחְדוּת achdut), meaning unity.

In Ottoman Palestine, Poale Zion founded the Hashomer guard organization that guarded settlements of the Yishuv, and took up the ideology of "conquest of labor" (Kibbush Ha'avoda) and "Hebrew labor" (Avoda Ivrit). The first formal congress of the "Jewish Social Democratic Workers' Party in the Land of Israel–Poalei Tziyon" was held in early 1907. Poale Zion set up employment offices, kitchens and health services for members. These eventually evolved into the institutions of Labor Zionism in Israel.

The party joined the Second International in 1915. It was invited to join the International in February 1915, on the initiative of Émile Vandervelde, at a conference held in London (in which the Belgian, French, British and Russian labour parties participated). The meeting of the parties from the Central Power countries, held in Vienna in April 1915 did not object to the affiliation of the party. Vandervelde also invited affliates such as the 'Jewish Social Democratic Labour Party in Palestine (Poale Zion)' to join, at a conference held in London (in which the Belgian, French, British and Russian labour parties participated).

=== UK during World War I ===
During World War I, Poale Zion was instrumental in recruiting members to the Jewish Legion. Poale Zion was active in Britain during the war, under the leadership of J. Pomeranz and Morris Meyer, and influential on the British labour movement, including on the drafting (by Sidney Webb and Arthur Henderson) of the Labour Party's War Aims Memorandum, recognising the 'right of return' of Jews to Palestine, a document which preceded the Balfour Declaration by three months.

== Factions and activity after World War I ==
=== Factions, 1920 split and aftermath ===
Poale Zion was torn between left-wing and right-wing factions in 1919–1920; the organization formally split at the Poale Zion fifth world congress in Vienna in 1920, following a similar division that occurred in the Second International.

The right wing was less Marxist and more nationalist, and favoured a more moderate socialist program and supported the International Working Union of Socialist Parties to continue the work of the Second International, essentially becoming a social democratic party.

The left-wing faction did not consider the Second International radical enough, and some accused its members of betraying Borochov's revolutionary principles (although Borochov had begun to modify his ideology as early as 1914, and publicly identified as a social democrat the year before his death). Jewish Communist Union (Poalei Zion), Komverband was the name taken by the Left World Union of Poalei Zion in 1921. Komverband had members in Russia, Lithuania, Latvia, Austria, Italy, Poland and other countries. Sections of Komverband included: Jewish Communist Party of Austria and Jewish Communist Party (Poalei Zion). In 1922 Komverband shifted its headquarters from Vienna to Danzig, in preparation for a party conference. At that conference the communists were expelled from the organization, and the Left Poalei Zion retook its former shape. Poale Zion Left, which supported the Bolshevik revolution, continued to be sympathetic to Marxism and Communism, and attended the second and third congresses of the Communist International in a consultative capacity. They lobbied for membership, but their attempts were unsuccessful, as the internationalist communist movement under Lenin and Trotsky was opposed to Zionist nationalism. The Comintern advised individual members of Left Poale Zion to join their national Communist parties as individuals; at their 1922 Danzig conference, these terms were rejected by the party. The Comintern declared it an enemy of the workers' movement.

Poale Zion Left opposed the decision by Poale Zion to rejoin the World Zionist Organization, viewing it as essentially bourgeois in character, and viewed the Histadrut as reformist and non-socialist. Aside from differing attitudes towards Zionism and Stalinism, the two wings of Poale Zion parted ways over Yiddish and Yiddish culture. The Left was more supportive of the latter, similar to the members of the Jewish Bund, while the Right bloc identified strongly with the emerging modern Hebrew movement in the early 20th century.

=== Palestine ===
In Palestine, the major leaders of Poale Zion since their immigration in 1906 and 1907 had been David Ben-Gurion, who joined a local Poalei Tziyon group in 1904 whilst living in Warsaw, and Yitzhak Ben-Zvi, a close friend of Borochov and an early member of the Poltava group. After the split the two Benim ("the Bens") continued to control and direct Poale Zion Right in Palestine.

The party in Palestine split into right and left wings at its February 1919 conference. In October 1919, a faction of the Left Poale Zion founded Mifleget Poalim Sozialistiim (Socialist Workers Party) which became the Jewish Communist Party in 1921, split in 1922 over the Zionist issues, with one faction taking the name Palestine Communist Party and the more anti-Zionist faction becoming the Communist Party of Palestine. The former retained its links to Poale Zion Left. These two factions reunited as the Palestine Communist Party in 1923 and become an official section of the Communist International. Another faction of Poale Zion Left, aligned with the kibbutz movement Hashomer Hatzair, founded in Europe in 1919, became the Mapam party. Poale Zion Right, under Ben Gurion's leadership, formed Ahdut HaAvoda in March 1919. In January 1930 it merged with another party to become Mapai, predecessor of the modern Democrats.

The Poale Zion Left continued as a separate party and ran in the 1931 Assembly of Representatives election, led by 1931 Assembly of Representatives election and electing one member to the assembly. In the 1944 Assembly of Representatives election it ran as part of the Left Bloc with the Hashomer Hatzair Workers Party on a joint slate that elected 21 representatives.

In 1946 the Poale Zion Left merged with the Ahdut HaAvoda Movement to form the Ahdut HaAvoda Poale Zion Movement (Hebrew: התנועה לאחדות העבודה פועלי ציון, HaTnu'a LeAhdut HaAvoda Poale Zion). Two years later the party merged with the Hashomer Hatzair Workers Party to form Mapam. Most senior Haganah commanders were Mapam members, including the head of the National Command Israel Galili who was one of Mapam's leaders. The Palmach was also dominated by Mapam with its commanding officer, Yigal Allon, and five brigade commanders being members. With the creation of Israel's national army this led to conflict with Ben Gurion. In 1953, after a series of confrontations, two of the four Area Command commanders and six of the twelve brigade commanders resigned. Those members of Mapam who remained, Yitzhak Rabin, Haim Bar-Lev and David Elazar, had to endure several years in staff or training post before resuming their careers.

=== Bolshevik Revolution and USSR ===
In Russia, the Poale Zion Left participated in the Bolshevik Revolution and organized a brigade of Poale Zion activists nicknamed the "Borochov Brigade" to fight in the Red Army. The party remained legal until 1928 when it was liquidated by the NKVD. Most other Zionist organizations had been closed down in 1919, but Poale Zion Left remained untouched because it was recognized as a Communist party. In 1919, the Communists of Poale Zion Left split to form the Jewish Communist Party which ultimately joined the Communist Party of the Soviet Union, leading to a sharp loss of membership in Russia. While the Bund was forcibly disbanded in 1921, Poale Zion and Hechalutz were allowed to operate freely in the Soviet Union until 1928.

=== Poland ===
In Poland, for a brief period following World War I, both factions of Poale Zion were reported as legal and functioning political parties. The Polish Left party was the largest Left Poale Zion party in the world. It worked closely with the Bund in developing Yiddish schools in Poland and supporting secular Yiddish culture, although they had political differences (e.g., the Bund was more supportive of the Polish Socialist Party than LPZ). As part of the large-scale ban on Jewish political parties in post-World War II Poland by the Communist leadership, both Poale Zion groups were disbanded in February 1950.

=== Austria ===
The Jewish Social Democratic Party "Poale Zion" (German: Jüdische sozialdemokratische Partei "Poale Zion"), later renamed Jewish Socialist Workers Party Poale Zion in German Austria (Jüdische sozialistische Arbeiterpartei Poale Zion in Deutschösterreich) in the fall of 1921 and Jewish Communist Party of Austria (Jüdische Kommunistische Partei Oesterreichs), was a political party in Austria. The party published Freie Tribune 1919–1921. The party was part of what was at the time the Jewish Communist Union (Poalei Zion), the left faction of Poale Zion.

In the First Austrian Republic, the left faction was led by Michael Kohn-Eber, who joined the Austrian Communist Party in 1938. The right faction also remained active until 1938.

=== United States ===
The first Poale Zion group in America was established in 1903. In 1915 it was estimated they had fewer than 3,000 members. After the First World War, the American party was led by veteran socialist Zionist thinker Nachman Syrkin. In America, the right faction was dominant, and initiated the National Labor Committee for Palestine, raising money for the Histadrut.

Manya Shochat, one of the Poale Zion leaders in Palestine, toured the United States in 1920. Writing to Rachel Ben Zvi she estimated there were “maybe” 2,000 members of Poale Zion in the whole country, with 180 of them in New York. She comments “The entire movement here is worthless.”

=== United Kingdom ===
Poale Zion in Britain formally affiliated to the British Labour Party in 1920. Its original affiliate status with the Labour Party in 1920 was as The Jewish Socialist Labour Party (Poale Zion).

=== Worldwide ===
Globally, Poale Zion, under the leadership of Shlomo Kaplansky, was involved in the 1921 formation of the centrist International Working Union of Socialist Parties, then between 1923 and 1930 the World Union of Poalei Zion (i.e., the PZ right) joined the Labour and Socialist International (as its Palestine section). As of 1928, it claimed to have 22,500 members in branches around the world; 5,000 in Poland and the United States, 4,000 in Palestine, 3,000 in Russia, 1,000 in Lithuania, Romania, Argentina and the United Kingdom, 500 in Latvia and another 1,000 scattered across countries such as Germany, Austria, Czechoslovakia, Belgium, France and Brazil. The general secretary of the World Union of Poalei Zion at the time was Berl Locker. The World Union had a women's wing, the Women's Organization for the Pioneer Women in Palestine.

==== World Union of Zionists–Socialists (1932) ====
In 1932, Poale Zion's world federation merged with Hitahdut Olamit, the World Union of Hapoel Hatzair and Zeirei Zion, to create Ihud Olami, the World Union of Zionists–Socialists. During this period several well-known Zionist leaders and politicians were active in Poale Zion, including Ben-Gurion, Ben-Zvi, kibbutz movement leader Yitzhak Tabenkin, Jewish Agency Executive member Shlomo Kaplansky, and future Israeli politicians Moshe Sharett and Dov Hoz.

== Holocaust ==
The Holocaust-era Jewish resistance group ŻOB was formed from a coalition including Hashomer Hatzair, Dror, Bnei Akiva, the Jewish Bund, various Jewish Communist groups, and both factions of Poale Zion. Poale Zion was also active in the Anti-Fascist Bloc.

Several notable Jewish resistance fighters during the Holocaust, particularly those involved in the Warsaw Ghetto Uprising, were members of Poale Zion. They include:

- Adolf Berman, Warsaw ŻOB fighter; Secretary of Zegota (Poale Zion Left)
- Hersz Berlinski, member of Warsaw ŻOB Command (Poale Zion Left)
- Yochanan Morgenstern, member of Warsaw ŻOB Command (Poale Zion Right)
- Emanuel Ringelblum, member of Warsaw ŻOB; chronicler of the Warsaw Ghetto (Poale Zion Left)

== Legacy ==
=== Mandatory Palestine and Israel ===
After World War I, David Ben-Gurion integrated most of Poale Zion Right in Palestine into his Ahdut HaAvoda party, which became Mapai by the 1930s. The Poale Zion Left merged with the kibbutz-based Hashomer Hatzair Workers Party of Palestine and the urban-based Socialist League of Palestine to form Mapam in 1948, which in the 1990s merged with two smaller parties, Ratz and Shinui, to form Meretz. In 1946, a split in Mapai led to the creation of another small party, Ahdut HaAvoda – Poale Zion, which united with Mapam in 1948. In 1954, a small group of Mapam dissidents left the party, again assuming the Ahdut HaAvoda – Poale Zion name. That party eventually became part of the Alignment in a 1965 merger with Mapai (and later included Rafi and Mapam). In 1992, the Alignment became the Israeli Labor Party. In 2024, the Israeli Labor Party and Meretz merged to form The Democrats.

=== Youth movements ===
Several youth movements emerged from Poale Zion: the Marxist Hashomer Hatzair (the largest, with 70,000 members on the eve of the Holocaust), the socialist Habonim Dror, the Left Poale Zion's Yugent, and Zeirei Zion.

=== North America ===
In North America, Poale Zion founded the HeHalutz movement, the Farband and Habonim Dror, and later the Labor Zionist Organization of America, which merged with other groups into the Labor Zionist Alliance, which rebranded itself in 2007 as Ameinu. US Poale Zion published a Yiddish newspaper, the Yidisher Kempfer, and an English journal, Jewish Frontier, edited by Hayim Greenberg and Marie Syrkin.

=== United Kingdom ===
In Britain, Poale Zion rebranded itself in 2004 as the Jewish Labour Movement.

=== Worldwide ===
Internationally, the Poale Zion right is represented within the World Zionist Organization by the World Labour Zionist Movement; the group "to the left" of the WLZM within the WZO is Mapam's successor, the World Union of Meretz. Meretz succeeded Mapam as a member of the Socialist International and, since 2013, is also a member of the Progressive Alliance.

== Electoral history ==
=== Russian Republic ===
Russian Constituent Assembly

Election year	Number of seats
1917	0 / 767

=== Soviet Union ===
Congress of Soviets of the Soviet Union

Election year	Number of seats
1922	2 / 2,214

=== Mandate of Palestine ===
Assembly of Representatives (Mandatory Palestine)

Election year	Number of seats
1931	1 / 71 Poale Zion Left
1944	21 / 173 Left Bloc (coalition of Hashomer Hatzair and Poale Zion Left)

== See also ==
- Jewish Communist Labour Party (Poalei Zion)
- Jewish Communist Party (Poalei Zion)
- Jewish Communist Union (Poalei Zion)
- Poalei Agudat Yisrael
- Mifleget Poale Zion VeHaHugim HaMarksistim beEretz Yisrael
- Labour Zionism
- Gordonia
- Farband
- Jewish left
