= Hirsch Berlinski =

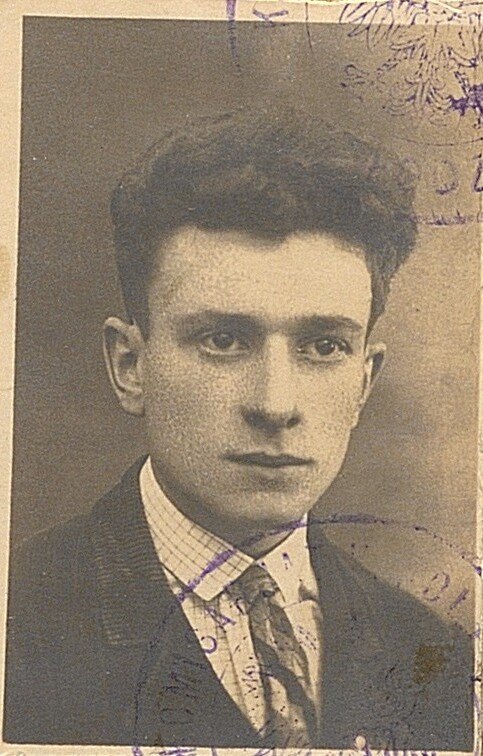
- Born: 1908; Łódź, then Congress Poland
- Died: September 27, 1944; Warsaw, German-occupied Poland
- Occupation: Resistance fighter
- Known for: Jewish resistance during World War II
- Awards: Virtuti Militari (posthumous)

Hirsch Berlinski (1908, Łódź – 27 September 1944, Warsaw) was a Jewish resistance fighter, a member of the Left Poalei Zion party, and one of the organizers of the Jewish Combat Organization during World War II.

== Biography ==
He was born in 1908 into a working-class family in the Bałuty district of Łódź. His father owned a small weaving workshop on Pieprzowa Street. Berlinski received a traditional Jewish education at a cheder before attending a state primary school. In 1923, he joined Cukunft, the youth organization of the General Jewish Labour Bund, and in 1924 moved to Left Poalei Zion, where he was active in youth work and trade unions and later served as a militia commander for the party in Łódź. During the 1930s, he worked in the textile industry, participated in workers’ committees, and was involved in strikes by Łódź textile workers.

In opposition to calls from community leaders in Warsaw Ghetto for accommodation with the invading forces, he was an advocate of collective resistance against the Nazis. During the Warsaw Ghetto Uprising he commanded a group of Poalai Zion fighters in the main ghetto. He escaped through the sewage system in the Aryan sector. He was killed during the Warsaw Uprising on September 27, 1944.

== Honours ==
On 19 April 1945, he was posthumously awarded the Virtuti Militari, Poland’s highest military decoration for valour. On 29 April 1945, his remains were reinterred at the Jewish Cemetery on Okopowa Street in Warsaw (section 39).

A street in the Old Town of Łódź is named in his honour as Ulica Hersza Berlińskiego.
