= Michael Kohn-Eber =

Austrian Jewish Socialist and Zionist activist

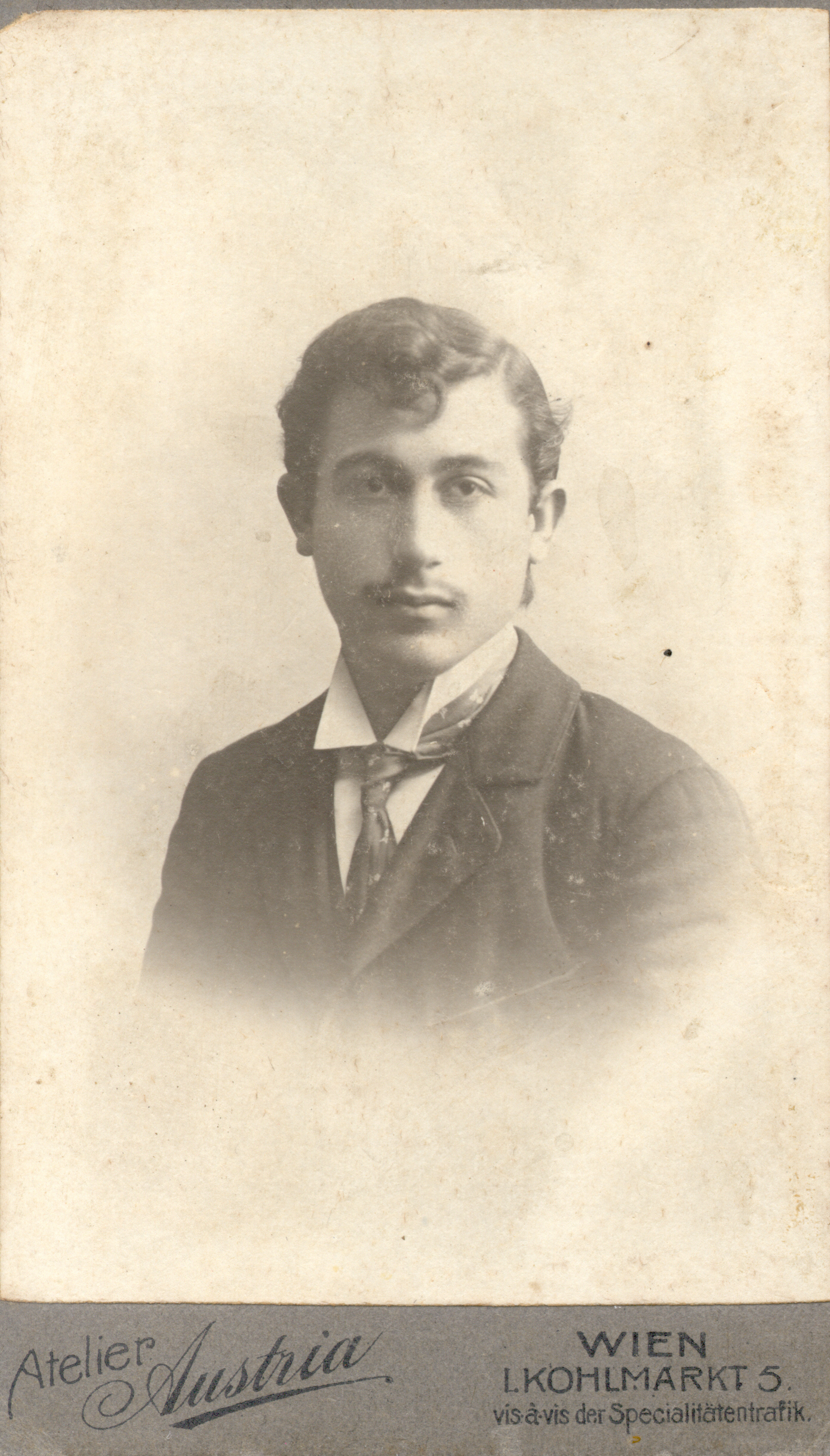
Michael Kohn-Eber in Vienna at the beginning of the 20th century

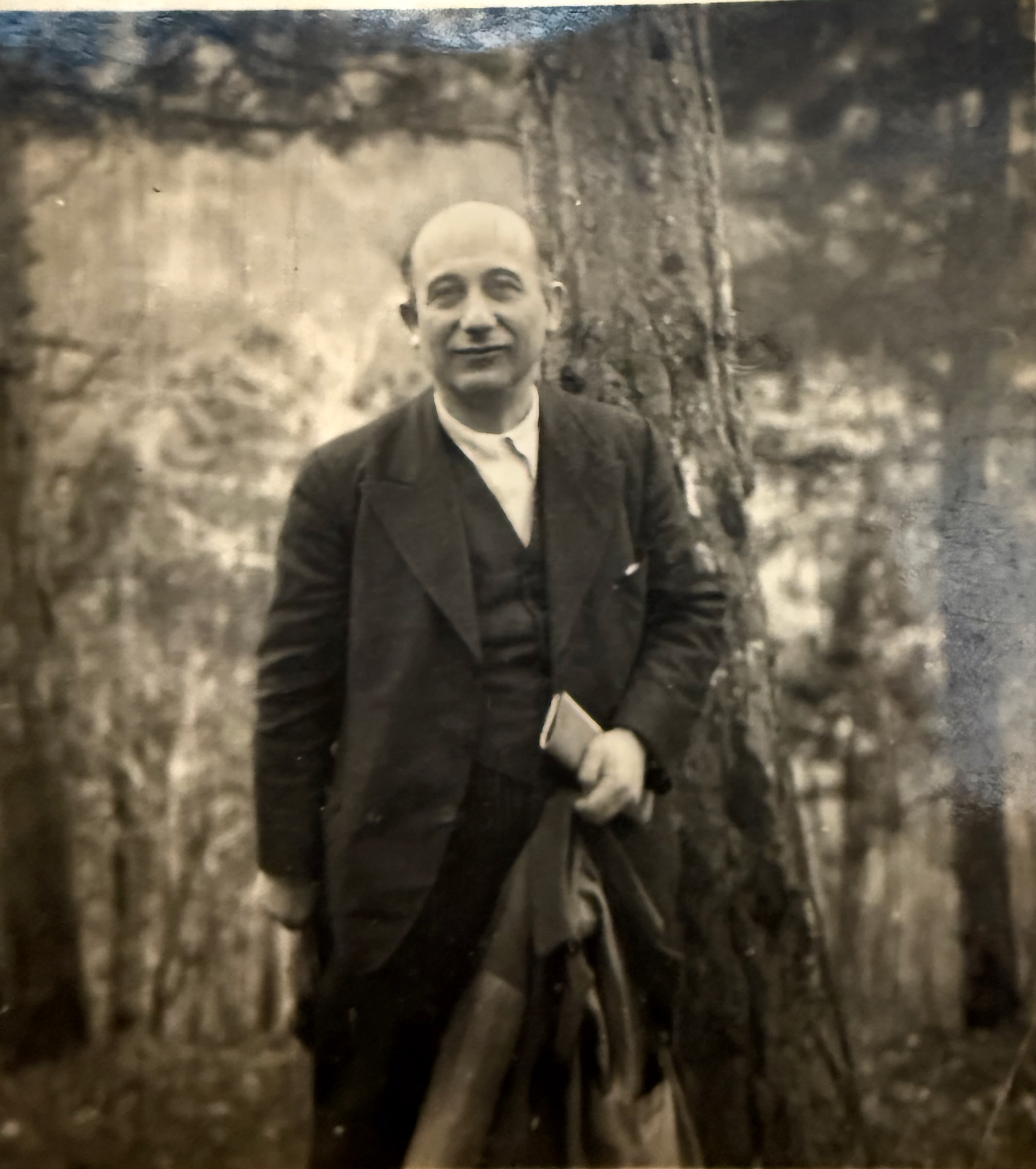
Michael Kohn-Eber (1935)

Michael Kohn-Eber (Hebrew: מיכאל קוהן-אבר); (Galicia - 1885, Vienna, Austria – 1956) was an Austrian Jewish socialist and Zionist activist, best known for his leadership of the Poale Zion Left faction in Austria during the early 20th century.

== Early life and background ==
Michael Kohn-Eber was born in 1885 in Galicia, then part of the Austro-Hungarian Empire (now in modern-day Poland), to Don Kohn and Hanna Eber. After the death of his father circa 1887, his mother moved with Michael and his sister Gizela to Vienna. There, she married Reuben Asher Braudes, a noted Hebrew writer and prominent Zionist activist, with whom she had three children: Mary, Josef, and Alex. Raised in a household immersed in the nascent Zionist movement, Kohn-Eber was strongly influenced by his stepfather's close association with Theodor Herzl and other early Zionist activists. He later enrolled at the University of Vienna to study law, although much of his time was dedicated to political activism.

== Leadership in Poale Zion ==
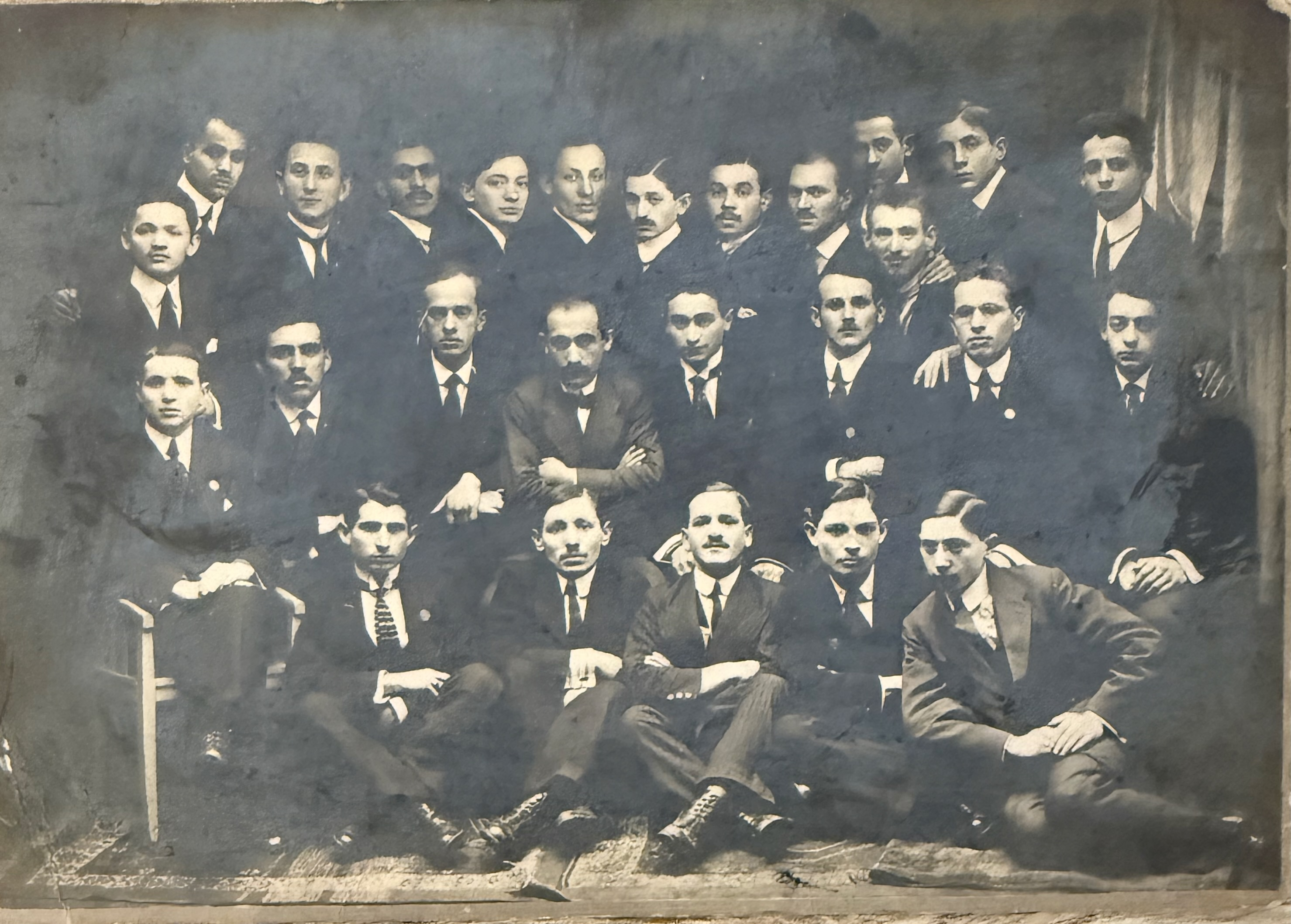
The Foundation Conference of Poale Zion (1905)

Kohn-Eber played a key role in the Poale Zion party, a Jewish socialist movement that merged Marxist ideology with Zionist nationalism. He led the Left faction of Poale Zion in Austria, which opposed rejoining the World Zionist Organization due to its perceived bourgeois character. Under Kohn-Eber's leadership, Poale Zion Left became active in Vienna's labor movement, organizing strikes and engaging in widespread political activism.

During World War I, Kohn-Eber refused military service from political reasons and was subsequently confined to a mental institution for three years. He was released following the death of Emperor Franz Joseph and the ascension of Emperor Karl. Kohn-Eber was one of the initiators of the January 1918 general strike opposing World War I. He and his peers were identified as "Jewish Bolsheviks"; they viewed Jewish mass migration to Palestine and the creation of a socialist Jewish state as part of the international proletarian struggle. On November 12, 1918, Kohn-Eber and his followers proclaimed the establishment of the Soviet Republic of Austria on the steps of the Vienna Parliament, though this act was swiftly suppressed by Social Democratic Party-aligned soldiers. Later that day, the Austrian Republic was officially declared by that party, ending centuries of the House of Habsburg rule.

Kohn-Eber led efforts to engage with the Soviet Comintern, a political international which existed from 1919 to 1943 and advocated world communism. The Comintern criticized the Zionist perception that Palestine was a rather under-populated country only waiting for Jewish immigration, and anticipated bloody conflicts with the Arabs. It characterized Zionism as a tool of British colonialism and saw Poale Zion as an essentially anti-communist political movement under socialist or even communist disguise. Kohn-Eber, however, saw the Comintern's negative attitude towards Socialist Zionism as a temporary mistake that could soon be corrected should Socialist-Zionist workers join the ranks of the international communist army in Eastern Europe and the Middle East.

In August, 1921 the Comintern made explicit its demand that Poale Zion abandon "Palestinian colonization" before relations could develop. After the majority of Poale Zion rejected that demand the following year, the Comintern broke all relations.

=== Imprisonment and persecution ===
The Austrian civil war against the Vienna fascist government, also known as the February uprising, began in February 1934. It was a series of clashes between forces of the right-wing government and the republican protection league of the Social Democratic Party, the Schutzbund (Defense-Alliance). After the defeat of the uprising, many members of the Social Democratic Party were hanged or jailed. The social democratic party was outlawed and the democratic constitution was replaced by a corporatist constitution modeled along the lines of Benito Mussolini's fascist Italy, for which the socialists coined the term "Austrofascism".

Kohn-Eber was among the first individuals to be arrested in jail. He remained in detention for several years without trial. After the Nazi annexation of Austria in 1938, he was rearrested shortly after his release and deported to the Dachau concentration camp, and subsequently to Buchenwald, despite suffering from heart disease and poor health. At these camps, it was common practice to notify families of deceased prisoners that their relatives had been "shot while trying to escape" (auf der Flucht erschossen), with a tin can containing ashes of their beloved ones along with the fabricated notification — a bureaucratic deception intended to obscure deaths resulting from mistreatment, starvation, or execution.

Remarkably, Kohn-Eber was released from Buchenwald through connections that he established with a Nazi leader with whom he shared the same cell in jail. This connection facilitated his release on the condition that he must leave Germany within 48 hours. With assistance from contacts within the Communist Party, Kohn-Eber and his wife, Esther, were smuggled through Switzerland into France, where they survived the remainder of World War II using forged documents.

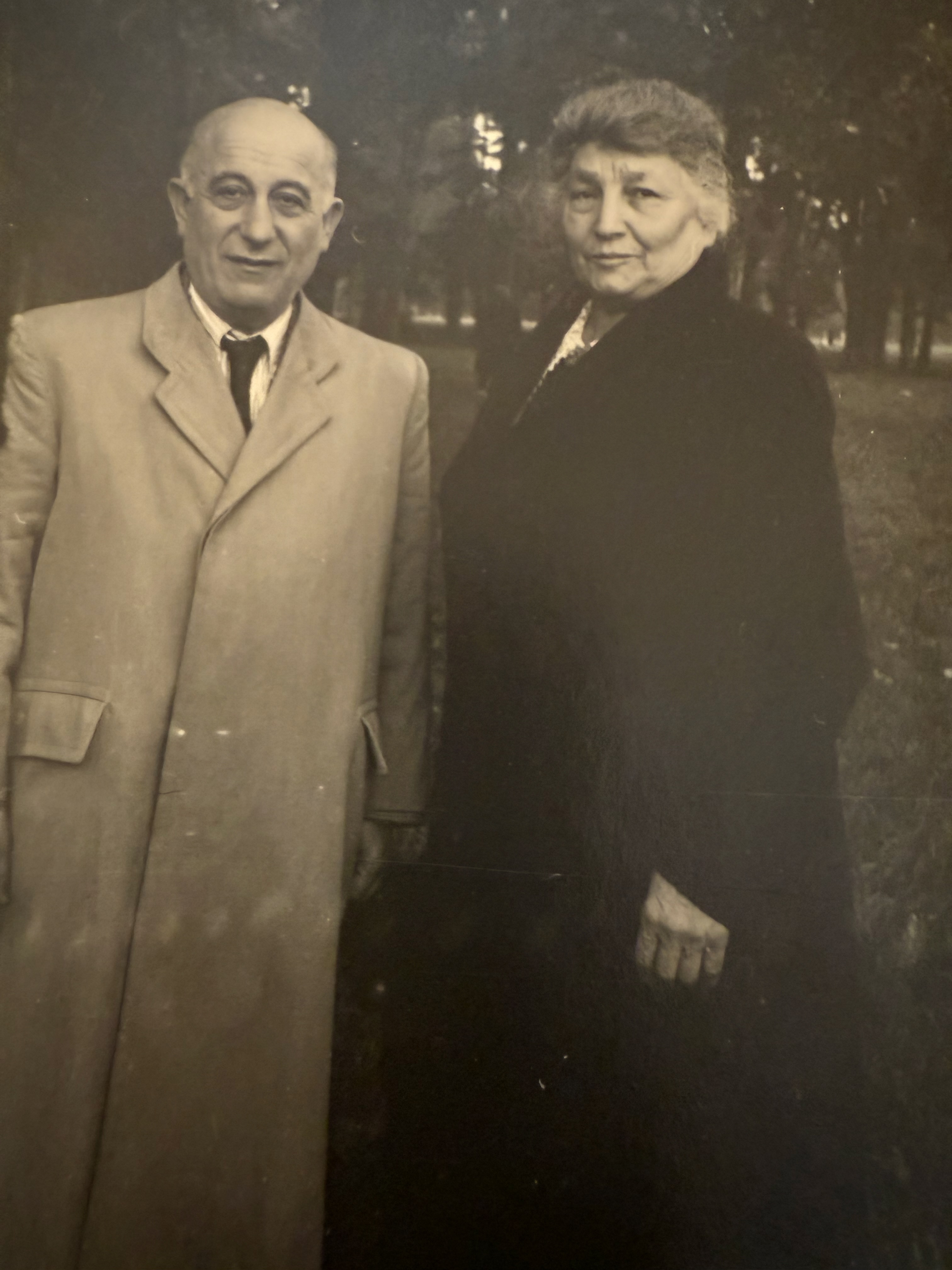
Michael Kohn-Eber and his wife Esther (1955)

== Later life and death ==
After the end of World War II, Michael Kohn-Eber returned to Vienna to realize that most of his family had not survived. His sister Gizela, together with her husband Moshe Weinreich, were murdered in Auschwitz in 1943. His young daughter, Lea, was murdered in 1941, at the age of 18 in Yugoslavia, during her journey to Israel (Palestine). The only survivors from his family were his older daughter, Ruth, who was hiding in Shanghai during the war, and his nephew, Dan Weinreich (Carmel), who succeeded to immigrant to Palestine on time. Hanna's other children, Mary, Josef, and Alex, escaped Austria before the war and built their life in the US.

Kohn-Eber resumed his political engagement, joining the Austrian Communist Party in 1945, despite its opposition to Zionism. The party was legalized after the war but it never became a major political force in postwar Austrian democracy.

Michael Kohn-Eber died in Vienna in 1956.

== Bibliography ==
- Kessler, Mario (2010). "The Comintern and the Left Poale Zion, 1919-1922". The Australian Journal of Jewish Studies. 24.
- Mendes, Philip (2014). Jews and the left : the rise and fall of a political alliance. New York: Palgrave Macmillan. ISBN 978-1-137-00829-9. OCLC 865063358.
