= Yitzhak Ben-Zvi =

President of Israel from 1952 to 1963

- יִצְחָק בֶּן־צְבִי
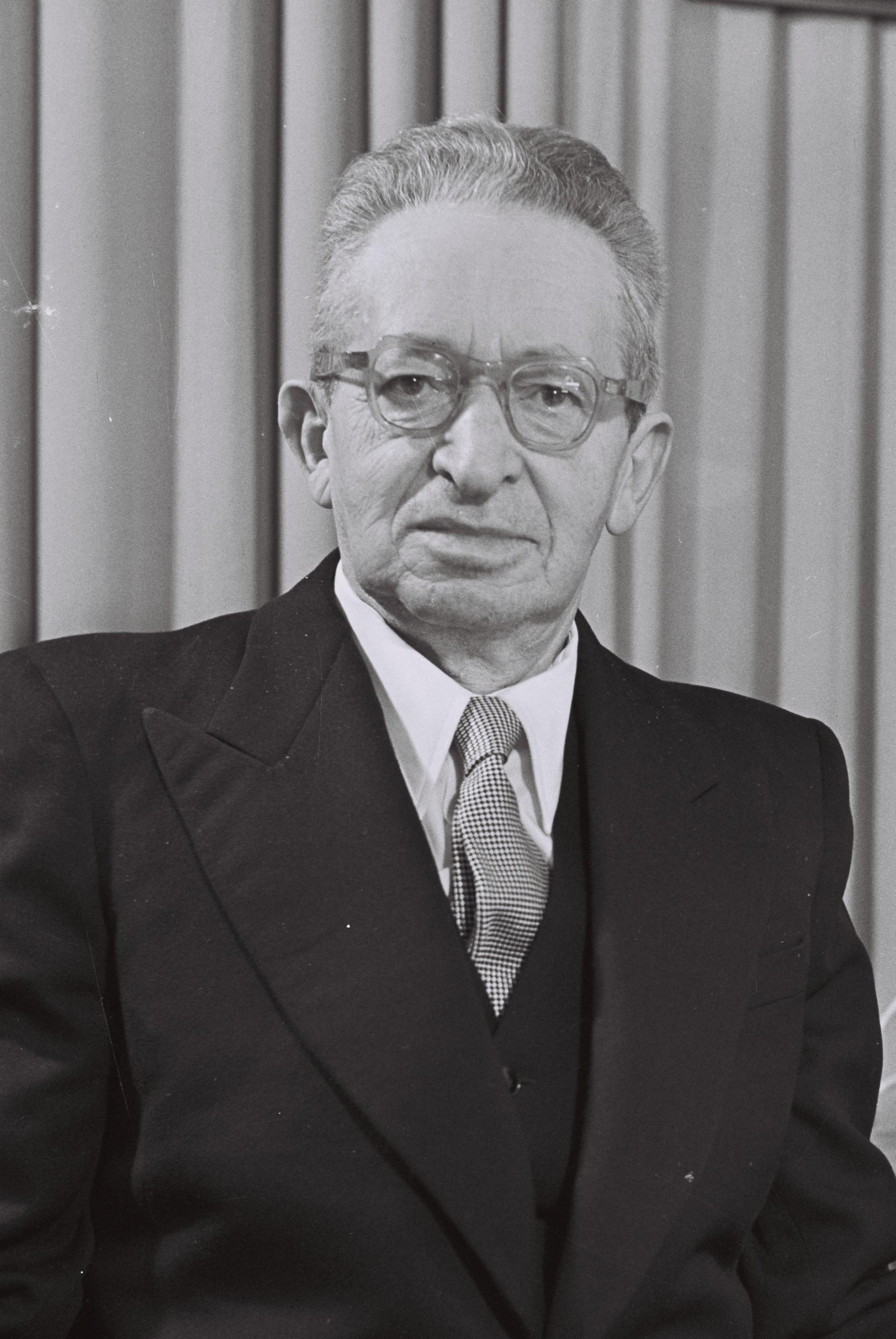
- Ben-Zvi in 1952

2nd President of Israel
- In office 16 December 1952 – 23 April 1963
- Prime Minister: David Ben-Gurion; Moshe Sharett
- Preceded by: Chaim Weizmann; Yosef Sprinzak(acting)
- Succeeded by: Kadish Luz(acting); Zalman Shazar

Member of the Knesset
- In office 12 February 1949 – 8 August 1952

Personal details
- Born: Izaak Shimshelevich; 24 November 1884 Poltava, Russian Empire
- Died: 23 April 1963 (aged 78) Jerusalem, Israel
- Party: Mapai
- Spouse: Rachel Yanait
- Children: 2
- Education: Istanbul University; Galatasaray High School
- Profession: Author; politician; historian; ethnologist
- Awards: Bialik Prize for Jewish thought Herzl Prize of the Zionist Organization

Yitzhak Ben-Zvi (Hebrew: יִצְחָק בֶּן־צְבִי Yitshak Ben-Tsvi; 24 November 1884 – 23 April 1963; born Izaak Shimshelevich) was a historian, ethnologist, and Labor Zionist who was the second president of Israel from 1952 until his death in 1963. Ben-Zvi is Israel's longest-serving president.

As a scholar, Ben-Zvi conducted extensive research on Jewish communities in the Land of Israel, including those that existed before the foundation of the modern State of Israel. He preserved oral histories, gathered firsthand accounts and documentary evidence, and published a number of books and articles on the subject. He shed light on their traditions, language, folklore, and religious practices through his work, which frequently focused on the Mizrahi and Sephardic Jewish as well as the Samaritan communities. The Ben-Zvi Institute he founded and directed continues to be an important institution for research on Jewish communities in the Middle East.

== Biography ==
=== Early life ===
Born in Poltava in the Russian Empire (today in Ukraine), Yitzhak Ben-Zvi was the eldest son of Zvi Shimshi (originally Shimshelevich), a writer and communal worker, and Karina (Atara), daughter of the rabbi Israel Leib Kupilevich. From his mother's side, Yitzhak Ben-Zvi was descended from Rabbi Meir Halevi Epstein. On his father's side, he traced his lineage back to Lithuanian Rabbi Jehiel ben Solomon Heilprin, Rabbi Eliyahu Chaim Meisel of Łódź, the mekubal Rabbi Moshe Ashkenazi (known as Moshe Iwer), and ultimately to the renowned commentator Rashi. His brothers were Moshe (who died aged 12 in March 1906), and the writer Aharon Reuveni. His sisters were the poet Shulamit Klogai and Dina, who married Benjamin Mazar.

As a member of the B'ne Moshe and Hovevei Zion movements in Ukraine, Zvi Shimshelevich was one of the organizers of the first Zionist Congress in Basel, Switzerland, in the fall of 1897, together with Theodor Herzl. At that Congress the World Zionist Organization was founded, and the intention to re-establish a Jewish state was announced. Shimshi was the only organizer of the first Zionist Congress to live to see the birth of the modern State of Israel in 1948. On 10 December 1952, Zvi Shimshi was honored by the first Knesset with the title "Father of the State of Israel"

Ben Zvi had a formal Jewish education at a Poltava heder and then the local Gymnasium. He completed his first year at Kiev University studying natural sciences before dropping out to dedicate himself to the newly formed Russian Poale Zion which he co-founded with Ber Borochov.

Yitzhak Ben-Zvi's parents were banished to Siberia following the discovery of a cache of weapons he had concealed in their home.

In 1918, Ben-Zvi married Rachel Yanait a fellow Poale Zion activist. They had two sons: Amram and Eli. Eli died in the 1948 Arab–Israeli War, defending his kibbutz, Beit Keshet.

=== Poale Zion and Bar Giora ===
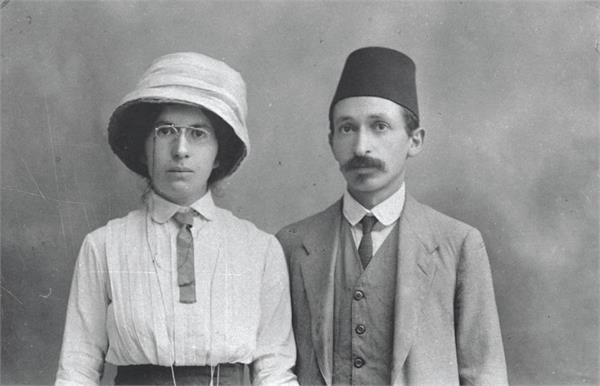
Ben Zvi with Rachel Yanait in Istanbul, 1913

Following Borochov's arrest, March 1906, and subsequent exile in the United States, Ben Zvi became leader of the Russian Poale Zion. He moved their headquarters from Poltava to Vilna and established a publishing house, the Hammer, which produced the party's paper, The Proletarian Idea. In April 1907, having been arrested twice and being under surveillance by the Tzarist secret police, Ben-Zvi made Aliyah. He traveled on forged papers. It was his second visit to Palestine. On his arrival in Jaffa he changed his name to Ben Zvi - Son of Zvi.

He found the local Poale Zion divided and in disarray. Slightly older and more experienced than his comrades he took command and, the following month, organised a gathering of around 80 members. He and a Rostovian - a strict Marxist group from Rostov - were elected as the new Central Committee. Two of the party's founding principles were reversed: Yiddish, not Hebrew was to be the language used and the Jewish and the Arab proletariat should unite. It was agreed to publish a party journal in Yiddish - Der Anfang. The conference also voted that Ben Zvi and Israel Shochat should attend the 8th World Zionist Congress in The Hague. Once there they were generally ignored. They ran out of money on their return journey and had to work as porters in Trieste.

Back in Jaffa they held another gathering, 28 September 1907, to report on the Hague conference. On the first evening of the conference a group of nine men met in Ben Zvi's room where, swearing themselves to secrecy with Shochat as their leader, they agreed to set up an underground military organisation - Bar-Giora, named after Simon Bar Giora. Its slogan was: "Judea fell in blood and fire; Judea shall rise again in blood and fire." David Ben-Gurion was not invited to join and it had been his policies which were overturned in April. Despite this Ben Zvi tried unsuccessfully to invite Ben Gurion onto the Central Committee. The following year Ben Zvi was one of the founding members of Hashomer.

In Jaffa Ben Zvi found work as a teacher. In 1909, he organized the Gymnasia Rehavia high school in the Bukhari quarter of Jerusalem together with Rachel Yanait.

In spring of 1910 Poale Zion (Palestine) decided to launch a Socialist Hebrew language periodical in Jerusalem. It was called Ha'ahdut and Ben Zvi persuaded Ben Gurion to join as proof reader and translator. The Haredi community in Jerusalem refused to rent them rooms. At the Poale Zion conference held in April 1911, Ben Zvi announced his plan to move to capital of Ottoman Empire, Istanbul. He is firstly study to Galatasaray High School and between years in 1912-1914 Istanbul University in Faculty of Law. By the following year many of the second Aliyah activists had gathered in the Ottoman capital, with Shochat, Ben Gurion, Moshe Shertok, David Remez, Golda Lishansky, Manya Wilbushewitch and Joseph Trumpeldor all there. As Poale Zion's leading theoretician in 1912 he published a two part essay arguing that in certain circumstances Jewish national interests must take precedence over class solidarity and that Arab labourers should be excluded from Moshavot and the Jewish sector.

=== During World War I ===
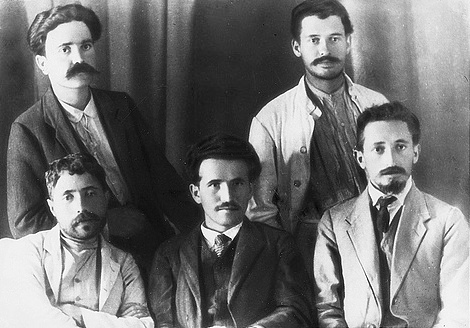
Editorial staff of Ha-Achdut, 1910. Right to left; seated – Yitzhak Ben-Zvi, David Ben-Gurion, Yosef Haim Brenner; standing – A. Reuveni, Ya'akov Zerubavel

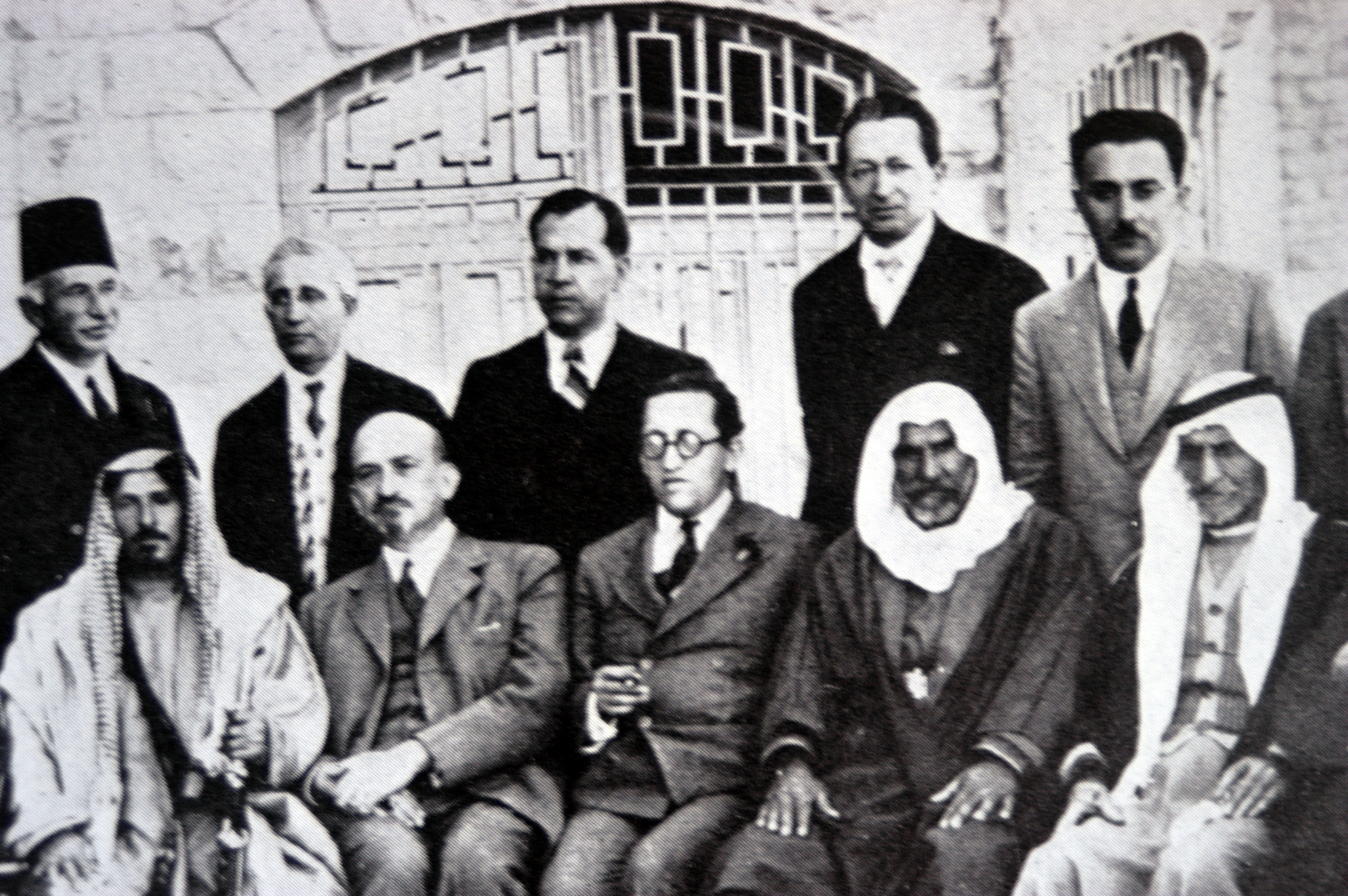
Yitzhak Ben-Zvi (standing, second from right) at a meeting with Arab leaders at the King David Hotel, Jerusalem, 1933. Also pictured are Chaim Weizmann (sitting, second from left), Haim Arlosoroff (sitting, center), and Moshe Shertok (Sharett) (standing, right).

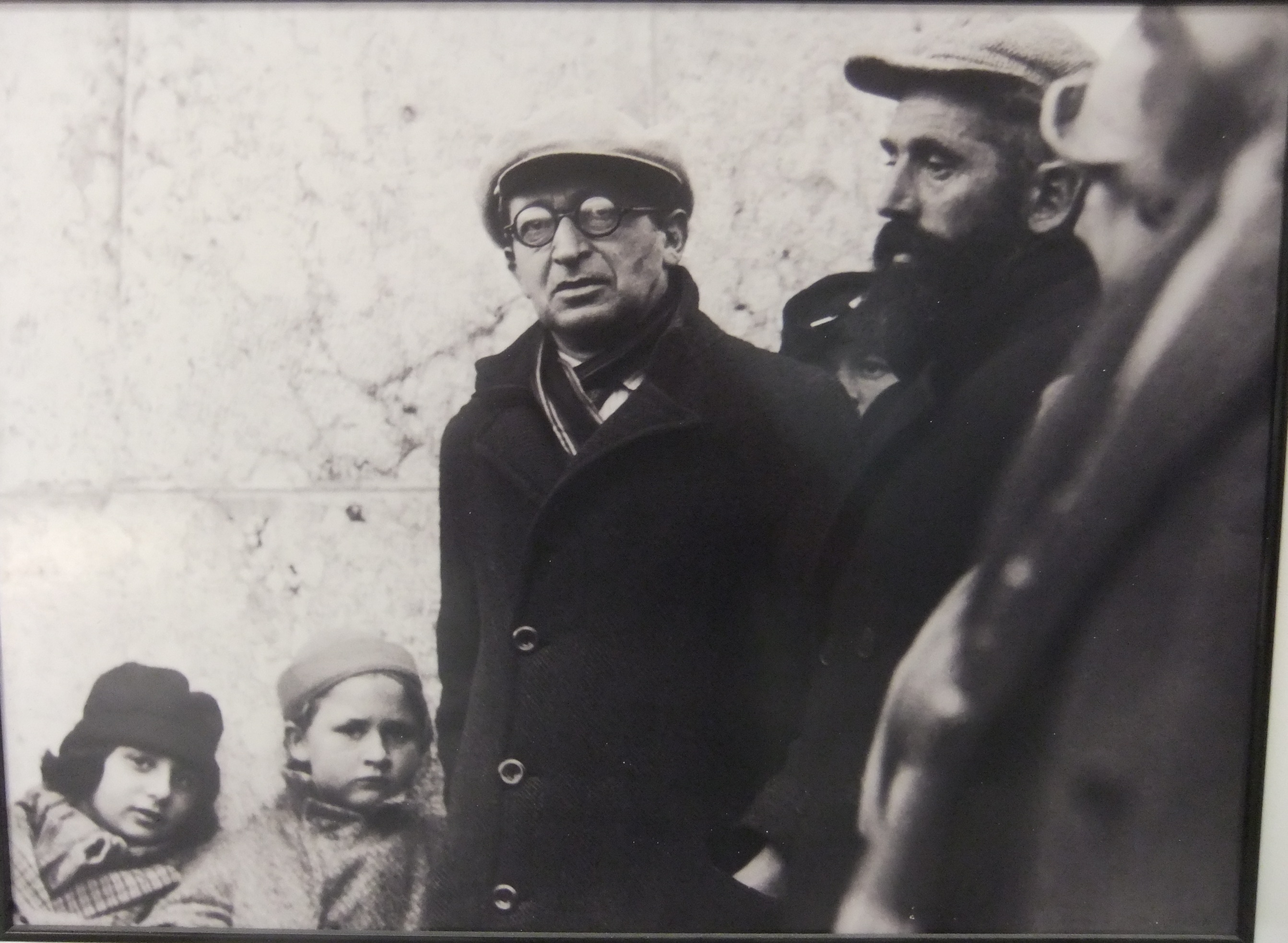
Yitzhak Ben Zvi at Tel Hai, 1934

In 1915, despite calling on Jews to become Ottoman citizens and attempting to assemble a militia in Jerusalem to fight on the Ottoman side in the First World War, both Ben Zvi and Ben Gurion were expelled to Egypt. From there they travelled to New York where they arrived wearing their tarboushes. In America they set about recruiting members of Paole Zion to fight on the Ottoman side. When this failed he and Ben Gurion embarked on educating Paole Zion followers on the settlement projects in Palestine. This resulted in the publication of Eretz Israel - Past and Present (1918) which ran to several editions, selling 25,000 copies. Initially Ben Zvi was to be co-editor but Ben Gurion ended up dominating all aspects and despite writing about a third Ben Zvi got little recognition.

Ben-Zvi served in the Jewish Legion (1st Judean battalion 'KADIMAH') together with Ben-Gurion. He helped found the Ahdut HaAvoda party in 1919, and became increasingly active in the Haganah.

On returning to Palestine he married Golda Lishansky who had remained in the country throughout the war.

=== Mandatory period ===
In 1919 he was one of the founders of Ahdut Ha'Avoda which he helped reshape as a non-Marxist, Social Democratic party, which joined the bourgeois World Zionist Organization rather than the Communist International. With his knowledge of the Arabic language Ben Zvi was in charge of policy towards the Arabs.

In 1921 he published an essay titled The Arab Movement focusing on Palestinian Arab Nationalism in which he attempted to "resolve the apparent contradiction between the long-term goal of Zionism—the creation in Palestine of a Jewish majority and state—and the fact that at present the overwhelming majority of Palestine's population was Arab". In the essay, Ben-Zvi argued that Arabs in Palestine did not constitute a unified national entity and that Palestinian Arab nationalism was essentially inauthentic, indirectly denying their right to self-determination. He further stated that there was no true Arab liberation movement among the Arab population in Palestine. Ben-Zvi asserted that the elite, Effendi, class in Palestine were exploiting Palestinian peasants (Fellahin), and as such, the Effendis had no popular support among the indigenous inhabitants. Zionism, Ben-Zvi concluded, was good for the Palestinian peasants since they are "interested in the expansion of employment and industry in the country and the improvement of the workers' lot, which of necessity results from Jewish settlement and immigration." He was head of the Poale Zion's Arab labor department, despite this he opposed a 1922 railway strike by Arab and Jewish workers in Haifa, and in 1923 he blocked a strike threatened by Arab workers in Jaffa and Lydda. Between 1925 and 1928 he produced an Arabic language Zionist bi-weekly newspaper called Ittiḥād al-ʿUmmāl (Workers Unity). In 1926 Ahdut HaAvoda decided to cease all efforts at unionising Arab workers and that Arabs should be barred from joining the newly formed Histadrut.

In 1931 he became chair of Va'ad Leumi.

According to Avraham Tehomi, Ben-Zvi ordered the 1924 murder of Jacob Israël de Haan. De Haan had come to Palestine as an ardent Zionist, but he had become increasingly critical of the Zionist organizations, preferring a negotiated solution to the armed struggle between the Jews and Arabs. This is how Tehomi acknowledged his own part in the murder over sixty years later, in an Israeli television interview in 1985: "I have done what the Haganah decided had to be done. And nothing was done without the order of Yitzhak Ben-Zvi. I have no regrets because he [de Haan] wanted to destroy our whole idea of Zionism."

=== Political career ===
Ben Zvi was elected to the Jerusalem City Council and by 1931 served as president of the Jewish National Council, the shadow government of the Jewish community in Mandatory Palestine. When Israel gained its independence, Ben-Zvi was among the signers of its Declaration of Independence on 14 May 1948. He served in the First and Second Knessets for the Mapai party. In 1951, Ben-Zvi was appointed one of the acting members of the Government Naming Committee, whose duty was to decide on appropriate names for newly constructed settlements.

=== Presidency ===
After the death of Chaim Weizmann, David Ben-Gurion proposed Yitzhak Ben-Zvi as the candidate for the presidency of the state at the party convention held on November 26, 1952. In a secret ballot, Ben-Zvi won over Yosef Sprinzak by a margin of 14 votes. On December 8, 1952, Ben-Zvi was elected to the position, subsequently re-elected in 1957 and again in 1962, supported by 62 coalition members of the Knesset, with 42 opposition members abstaining. He was the only president to be elected for three terms, and during his second and third candidacies, he was the sole nominee without any opposition. During his tenure, he won the sympathy of all elements of the political spectrum.

Yitzhak and Rachel Ben-Zvi declined to move from their residence on Ibn Gabirol Street in Jerusalem to a luxurious and representative mansion. Therefore, the Israeli government acquired the Ben-Yehuda family's property on 17 Alharizi Street for the President's Residence. At their home, they performed the traditional duties of the president. Each month, on the eve of the new month, representatives from diverse Jewish communities were welcomed. Throughout Ben-Zvi's tenure, delegates from Jewish communities spanning North Africa, Iran, Bukhara, Hungary, Babylonia, Romania, Kurdistan, Czechoslovakia, Egypt, Italy, India, Greece, Bulgaria, United Kingdom, Ireland, and Latin America visited in this capacity. As part of Rachel's official activities, the Rachel Ben-Zvi Foundation for Israeli Children was established.

Ben-Zvi believed that the president should set an example for the public, and that his home should reflect the austerity of the times. For over 26 years, he and his family lived in a wooden hut in the Rehavia neighborhood of Jerusalem. The State of Israel took interest in the adjacent house, built and owned by Nissim and Esther Valero, and purchased it after Nissim's death to provide additional space for the President's residence. Two larger wooden structures in the yard were used for official receptions. During Ben-Zvi's presidency, his residence was opened to the public twice a year, during the festivals of Sukkot and Independence Day.

As part of the clemency powers vested in the president, Ben-Zvi was presented, among other things, with requests for clemency for defendants in trials of public interest, including Adolf Eichmann and the killers of Rezső Kasztner. Under the clemency powers, Ben-Zvi released all the accused in the Kafr Qasim massacre.

Yitzhak Ben-Zvi (standing, second from right) and a three-star general (standing, right) meets with Marvin Garfinkel, a member of the United Jewish Appeal Young Leadership Mission to Israel, in his wooden cabin, June 13, 1961

In 1958, President Ben-Zvi visited the Kingdoms of the Netherlands and Belgium at the invitation of their monarchs. In 1959, he made an official visit to Burma, then Israel's only friend in Asia. In August 1962, Ben-Zvi embarked on a state tour of Africa, during which he visited the Central African Republic and the Republic of the Congo, signing cooperation agreements with them.

Ben-Zvi used to participate in a weekly Gemara lesson and refused to attend the opening celebrations of a Reform synagogue in Jerusalem.

Ben-Zvi died at the start of his third term on April 23, 1963.

== Research ==
Yitzhak Ben-Zvi engaged in the study of various fields within Jewish studies, including the history of the Jews and Judaism in the Land of Israel and the history of Jewish communities in the Arab world, and their customs. He authored over 150 scientific publications in these fields, including approximately twenty books and numerous articles on publicistic matters and research.

His initial writings on the research fields he later extensively explored were penned during his journey to the Land of Israel in 1904, during which he visited biblical sites and was impressed by encounters with the Samaritan community, prompting further investigations.

Ben-Zvi's scholarly contributions also extended to areas such as archaeology, epigraphy, and topography, where he delved into the traditions of fellahin and Bedouins. Following the establishment of Israel, he turned his attention to significant discoveries like the Dead Sea Scrolls, contributing to the study of Jewish history and culture. Additionally, he was involved preserving biblical manuscripts from Jewish communities in the Arab world, notably the Aleppo Codex, which became a focal point of his research and publications.

During his time in Vilnius, Ben-Zvi's first article, "די יידישע אומוואנדערונגען" ("The Jewish wanderings") was published, examining the history of the Jewish diaspora and exploring the influence of the "isolated element" and the "comprehensive element" on Jewish integration into general society and migration patterns. In 1911, he published an essay in Ha-Shiloaḥ on the Maccabean revolt. Subsequently, his research interests focused on the Land of Israel, local history, and the study of sub-divisions and sects within the Jewish people. His writings on non-Jewish settlements in the Land of Israel were compiled in the books Our Neighbors in the Land and The Population of the Land of Israel. His studies on the Samaritan community were collected in Book of the Samaritans.

Ben-Zvi's area of interest encompassed the history of the Jews in the Land of Israel from the destruction of the Second Temple to the Zionist revival. His book, Eretz Israel and Its Settlement During Ottoman Rule, provided a political, social, economic, and spiritual overview of the Jewish population in the Land of Israel over 400 years (1517–1917), gathering and analyzing Arabic and Turkish documents. Following his 1922 publication entitled "The Jewish Settlement in the Village of Peki'in," he began researching agricultural settlements preceding modern settlement in the Land of Israel. His studies on Shefar'am, Kafr Yasif, Hasbaya, and others were compiled in the volumes of She'ar Yeshuv. Additionally, Ben-Zvi explored the demographic origins of the rural Arab population, suggesting potential Jewish ancestry among a significant portion of them. Ben-Zvi also advocated for the repatriation of Jews who had been driven out of Peki'in, and initiated the establishment of Peki'in HaHadasha.

In 1948, Ben-Zvi headed the Institute for the Study of Oriental Jewish Communities in the Middle East, later named the Ben-Zvi Institute (Yad Ben-Zvi) in his honor. The Ben-Zvi Institute occupies Nissim Valero's house. His main field of research was the Jewish communities and sects of Asia and Africa, including the Samaritans and Karaites.

=== Study of the Samaritans ===
Ben-Zvi had a unique relationship with the Samaritan community. His first encounters with the community were in 1908, when he first met the elder Abraham son of Marhiv Zeadaka Hazafrir, from whom he rented a room in Jaffa, aiming to learn Arabic. He developed a fascination for the Samaritans, establishing friendships, visiting, and exchanging letters with High Priests, leaders and scholars such as Yaakov son of Aharon, Abu Shafi, and Yefet Zadaka.

After learning Arabic and Samaritan Hebrew, he decided to undertake a thorough study of the Samaritans, including their religion, literature, and settlements. As a historian and ethnologist, he published a book about the Samaritans in 1935 titled Book of the Samaritans (an updated edition followed in 1976). As a leader of the Jewish Agency and the National Council, and finally as president, Ben Zvi was viewed by the Samaritans as an appropriate person to address their grievances. Ben Gurion learned about the Samaritans from Ben-Zvi, and he also backed the cause of the Samaritans residing in Israel. In 1954, Ben-Zvi helped to establish a Samaritan quarter on the outskirts of Holon. The quarter was named Neve Pinchas after Pinhas Ben-Abraham, the high priest of the Samaritan community.

== Awards and recognition ==
In 1953, Ben-Zvi was awarded the Bialik Prize for Jewish thought.

Ben-Zvi's photo appears on 100 NIS bills. Many streets and boulevards in Israel are named for him. In 2008, Ben-Zvi's wooden hut was moved to Kibbutz Beit Keshet, which his son helped to found, and the interior was restored with its original furnishings. The Valero house in Rehavia neighbourhood was designated an historic building protected by law under municipal plan 2007 for the preservation of historic sites.

== Published works ==
- Sefer HaShomronim [Book of the Samaritans] (1935)
- She'ar Yeshuv (1927)
- Yehudey Khaybar veGoralam [The Jews of Kheibar and their fate] (1940)
- Derakhai Siparti, (Jerusalem, 1971)
  - Israel and the study of the homeland, 1927-1927
  - The Book of the Samaritans, 1935-1935
  - Poalei Zion in the second ascent, 1951–77
  - The Land of Israel and its settlement during the Ottoman rule, 1955-1955
  - Memories and records: from youth to 1920, 5666-1966
  - Studies and sources, 5566-1960
  - The Hebrew regiments: fees, 5777 1967
  - The vision and its fulfillment: chapters of memoirs and notes on the problems of the Histadrut, 1968-5578
  - Reshmi Derech, (edited by Rachel Yanait Ben-Zvi), 1972
  - Studies in Keter Aram Tzuba, 1960-57
    - Book of Tolid Hagana, 1955-1955
  - Travels: on the paths of the country and its neighbors - from itineraries and diaries, 1960-57
    - The Jerusalem "temples" and the Torah in the Karaite synagogues in Kushta and Egypt, Kiryat Safar, Lev (2017), pages 366-374
    - Sefer Safed: Studies and sources on the community of Safed from the 16th century to the 19th century, 5772 1962* Sefer Hashomer: Words of Friends, 5772 1962

== Gallery ==
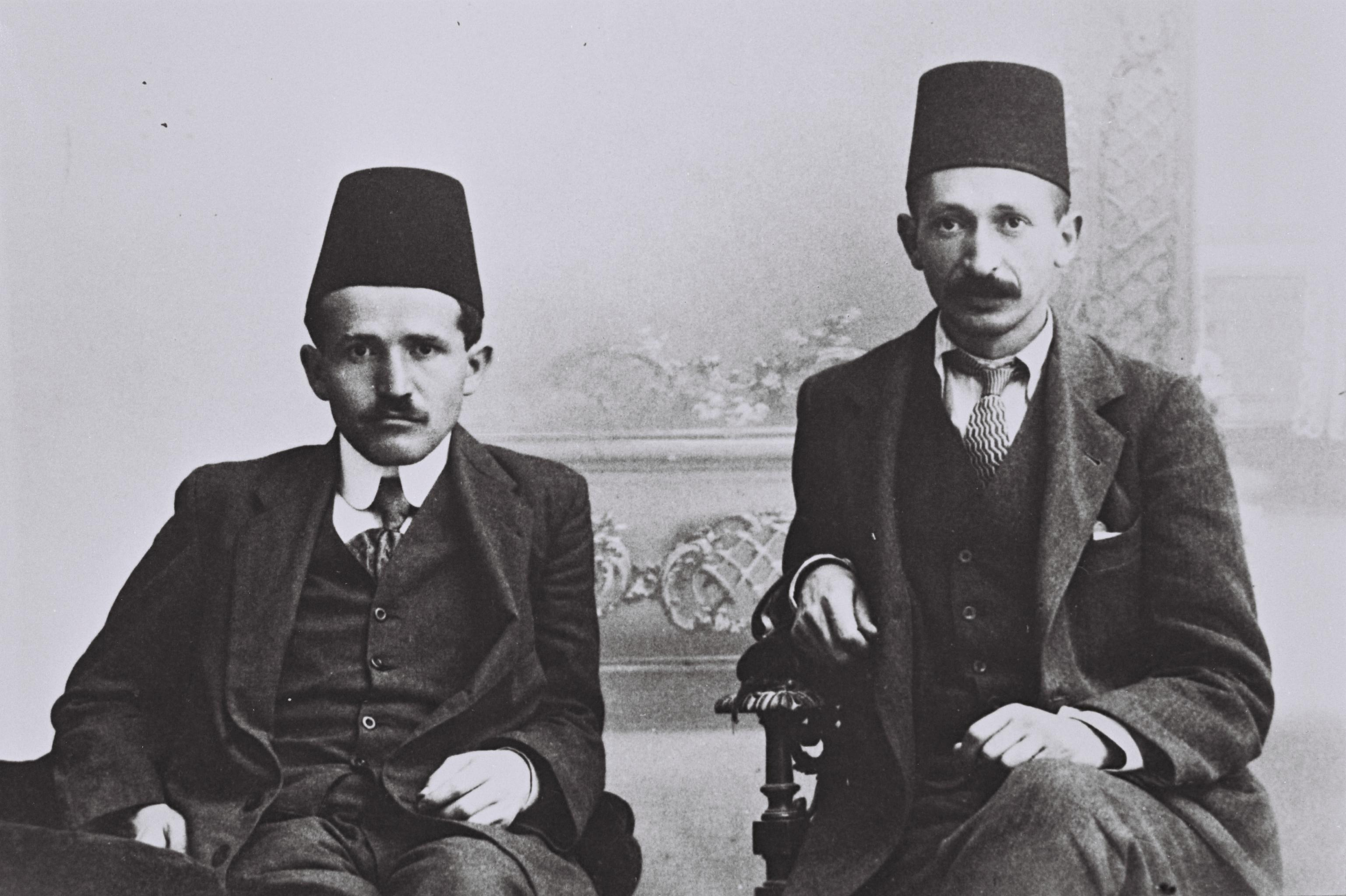
With Ben Gurion in Istanbul, October 1912

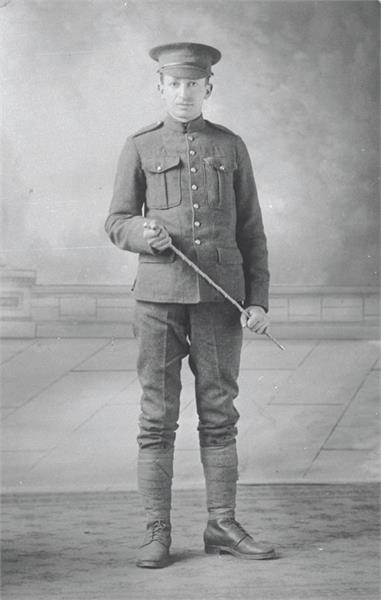
Private Yitzhak Ben-Zvi as a volunteer in the Jewish Legion, 1918

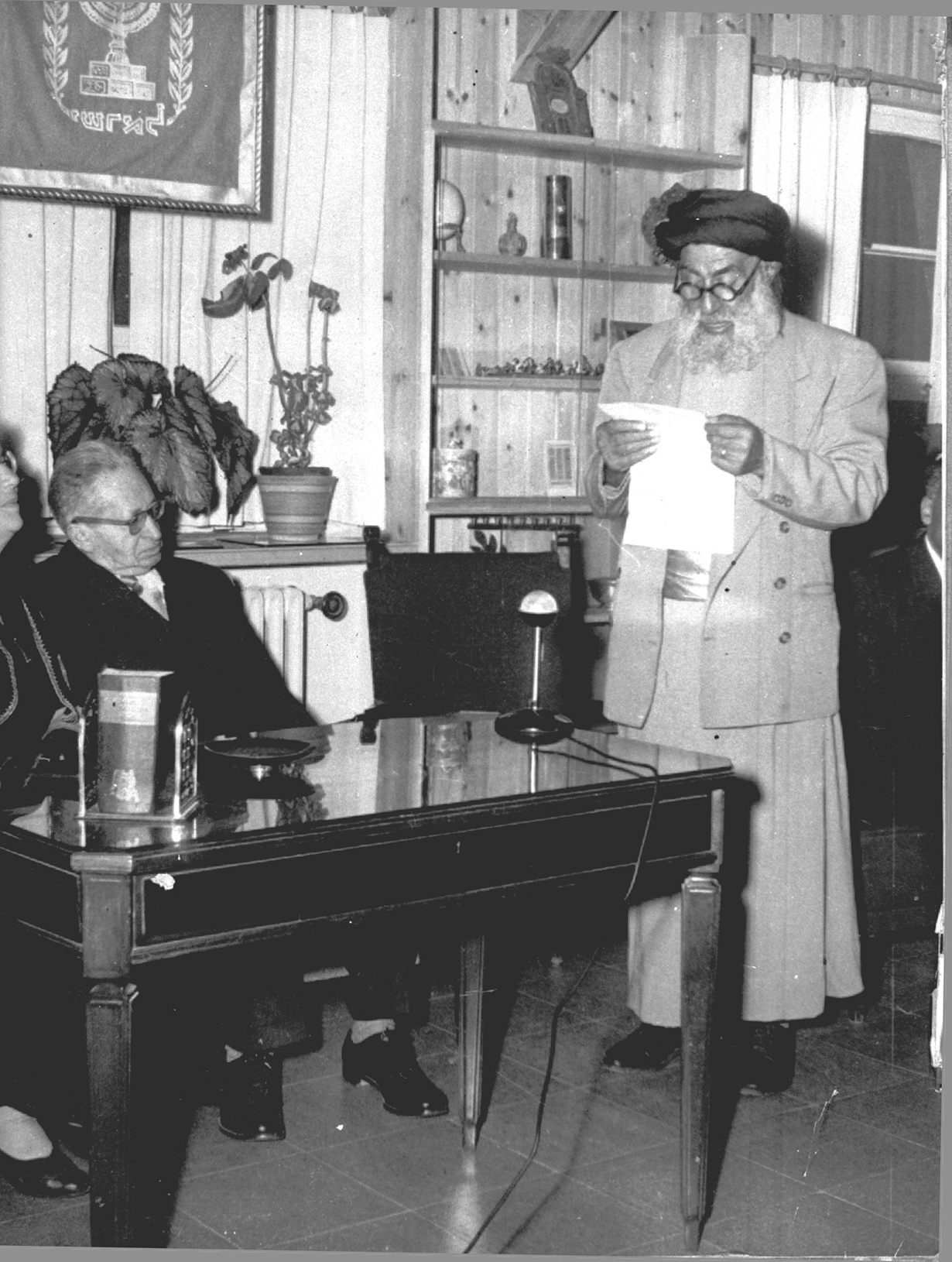
Rabbi Moshe Gabai petitioning President Zvi to help the Jewish community in Zacho, Iraq, 1951

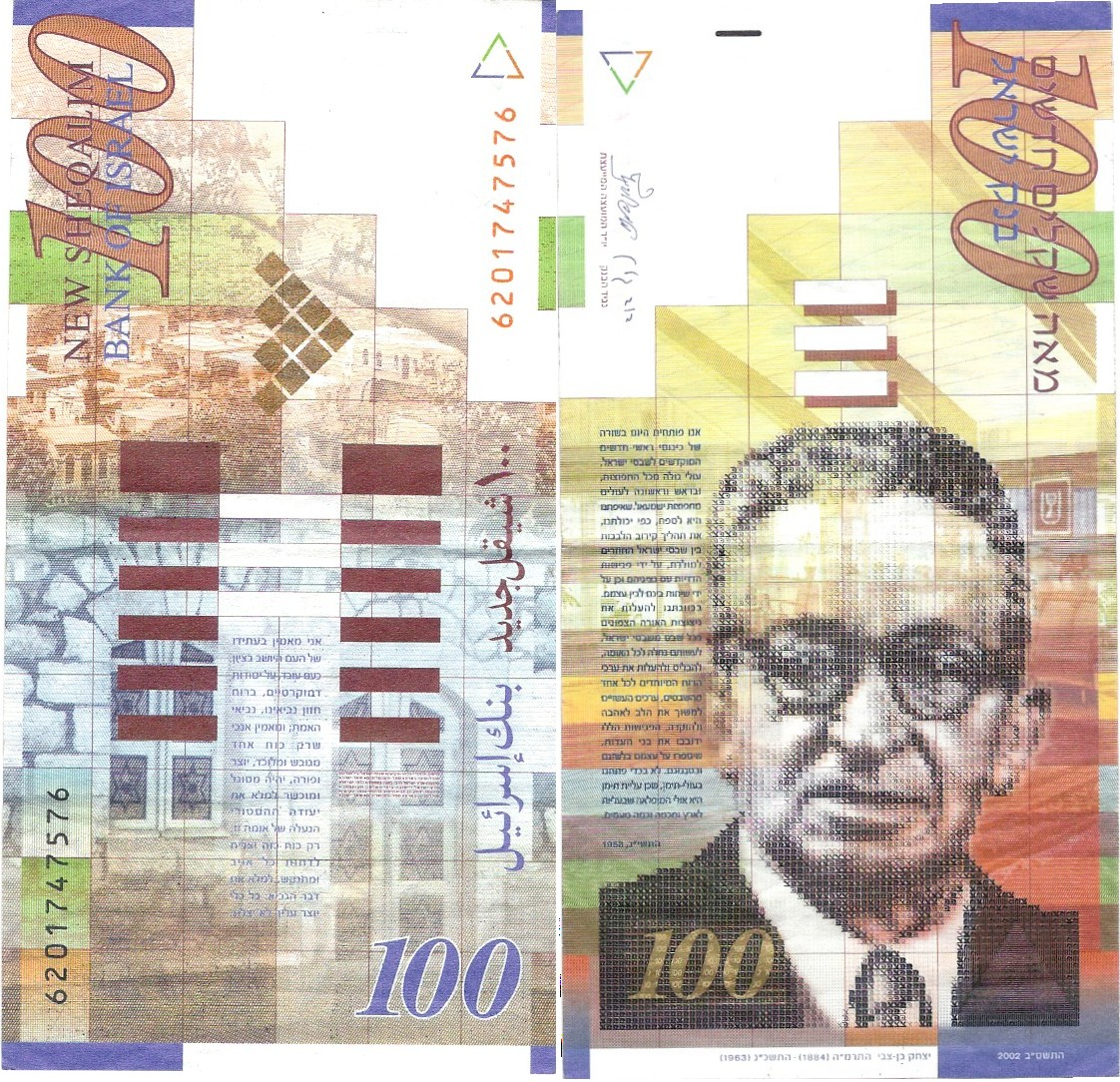
100 Israeli new shekel bill

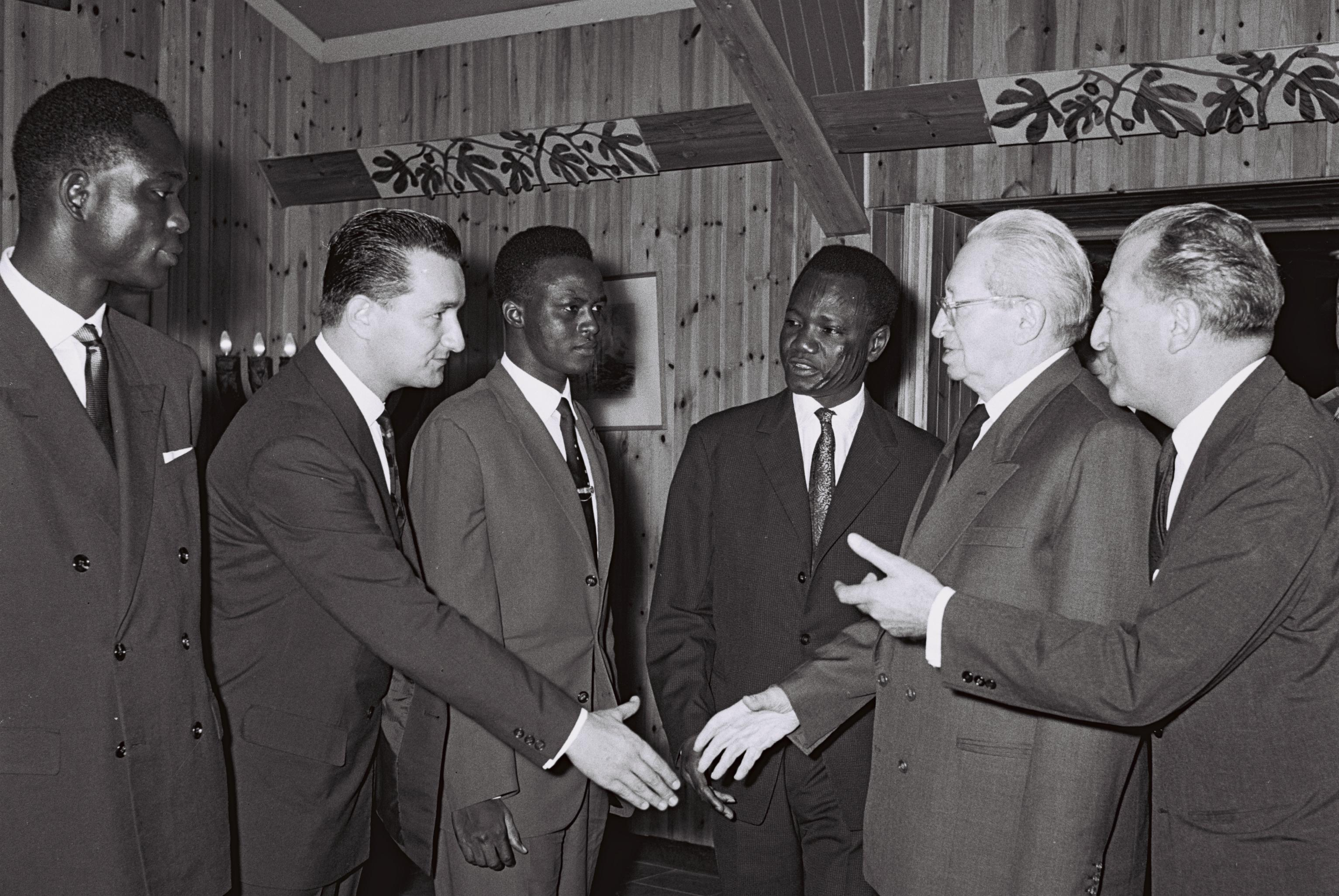

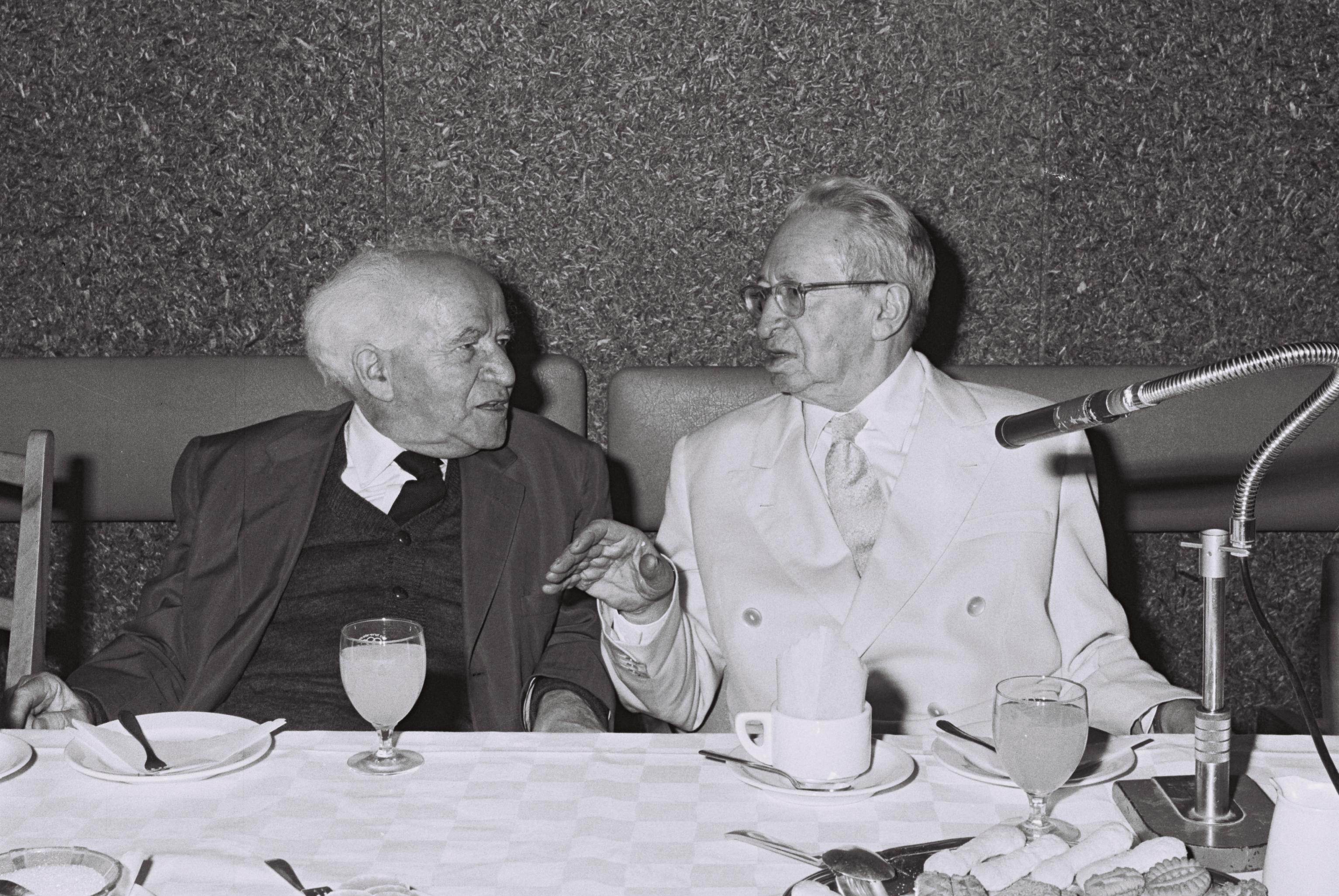

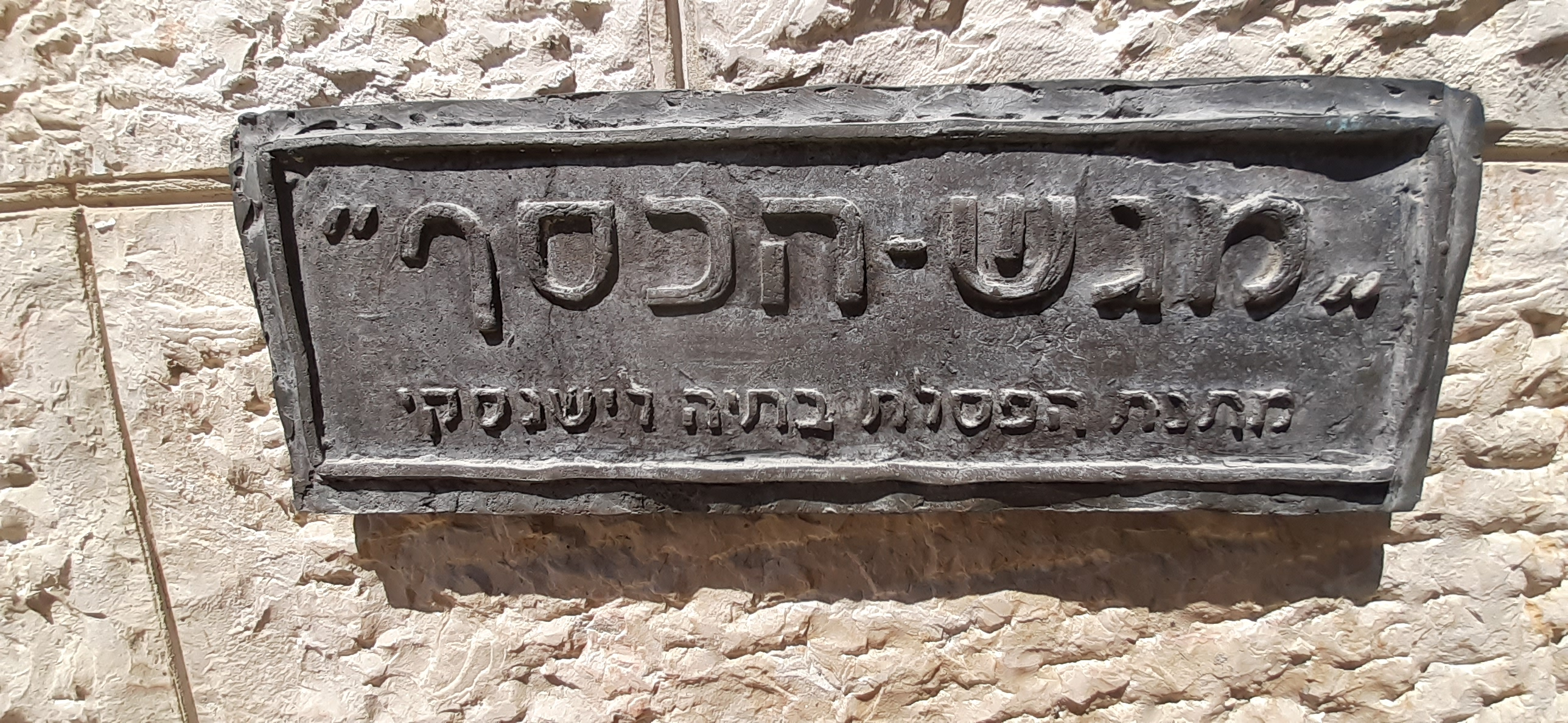

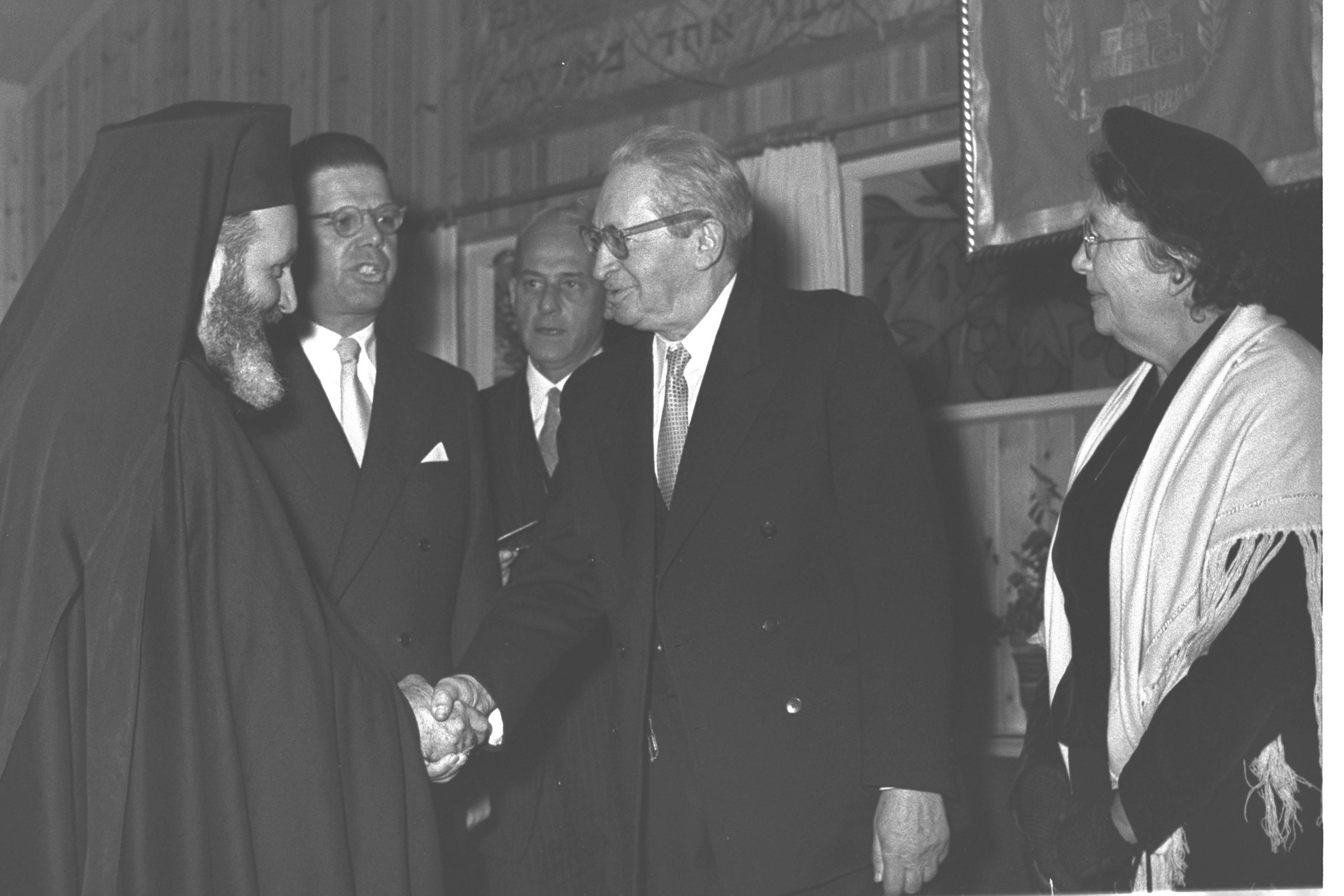

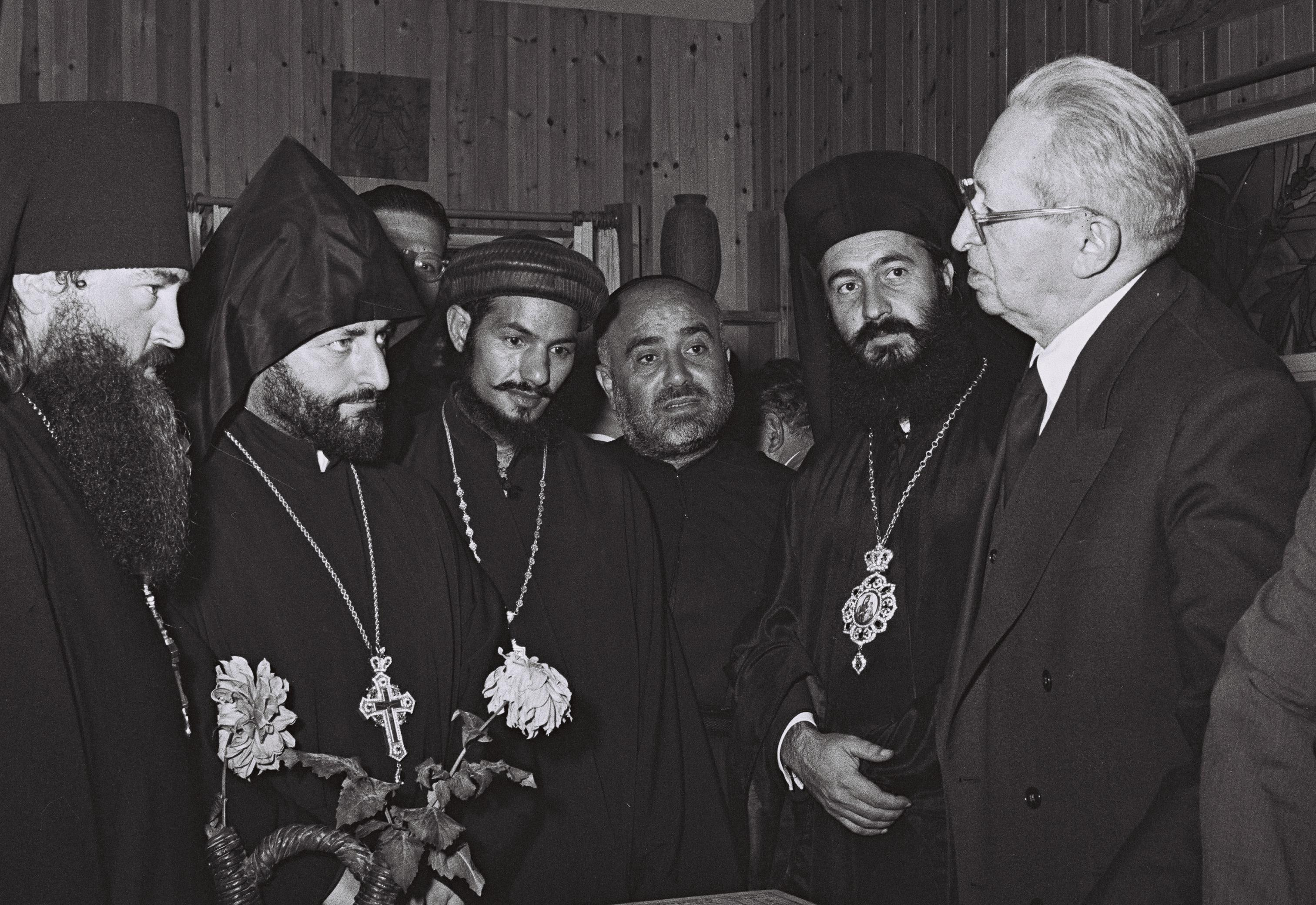

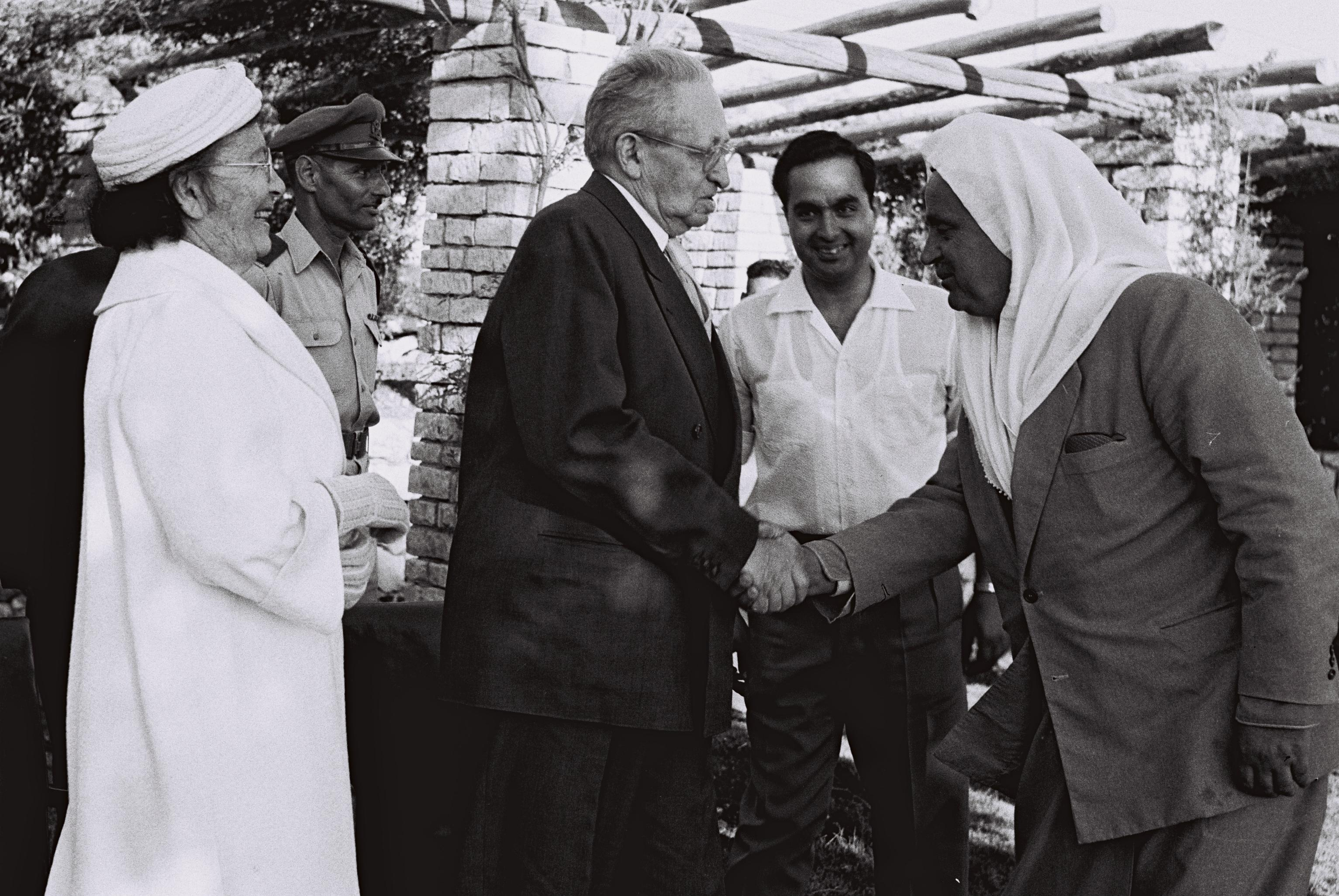

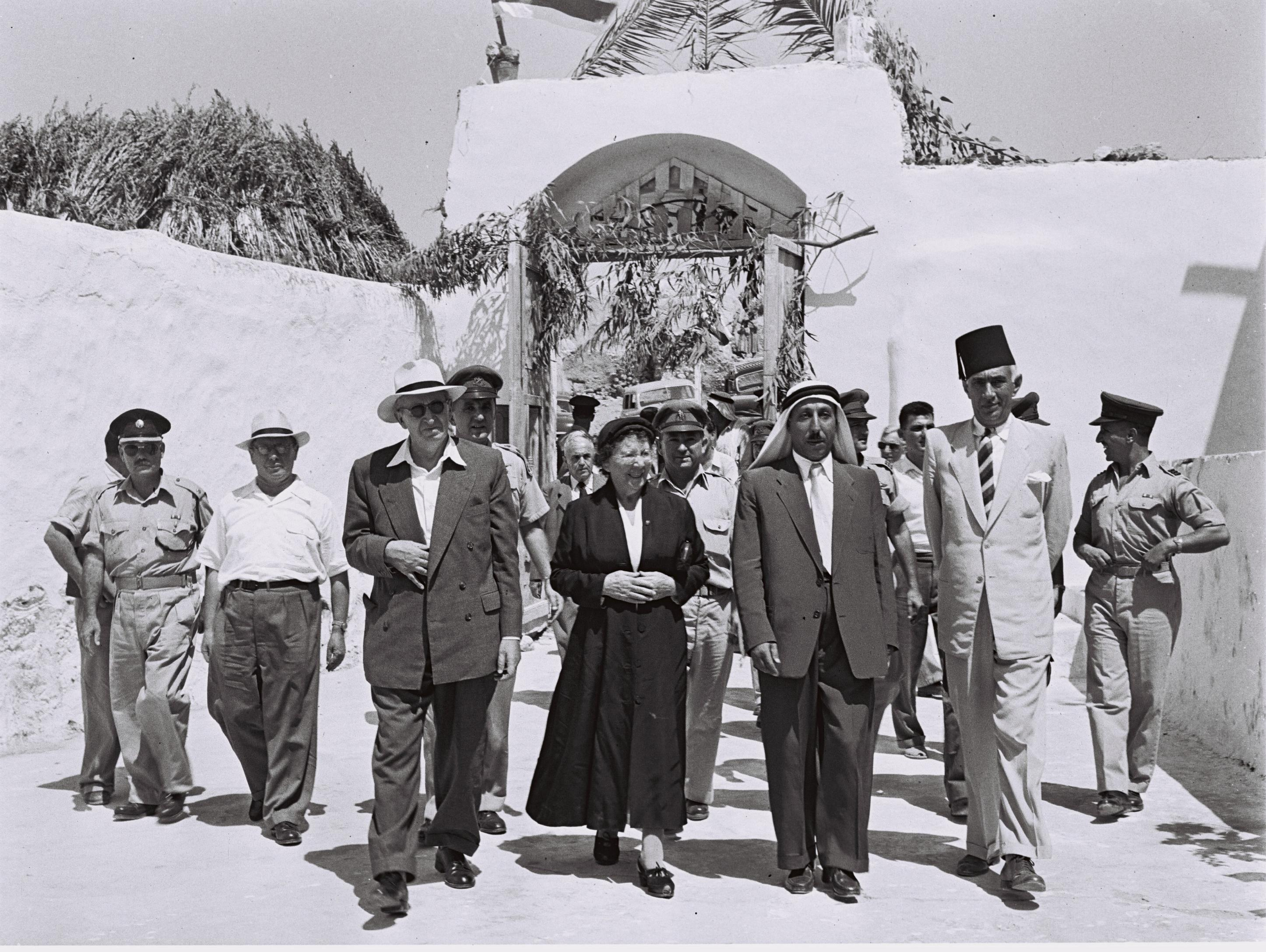

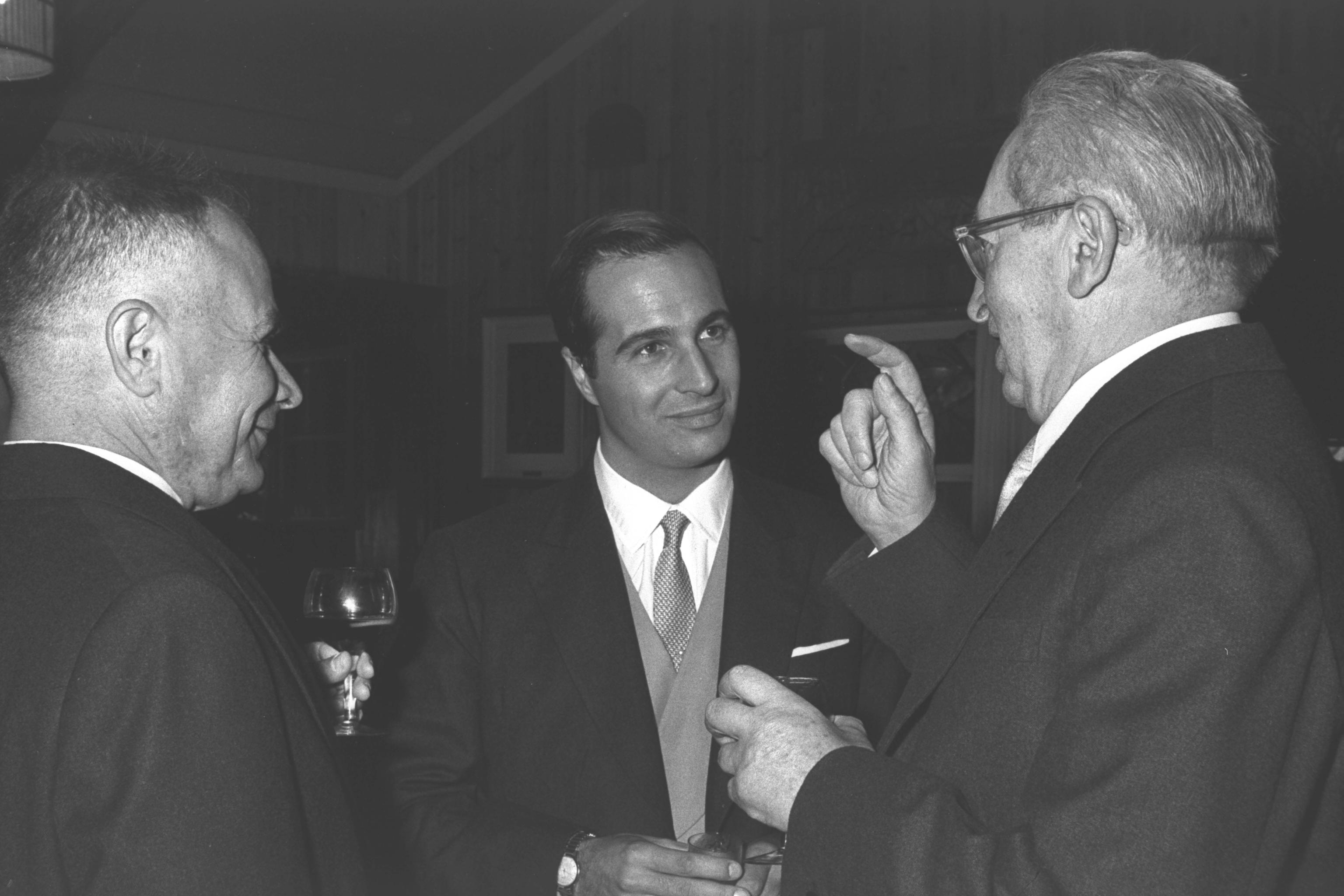

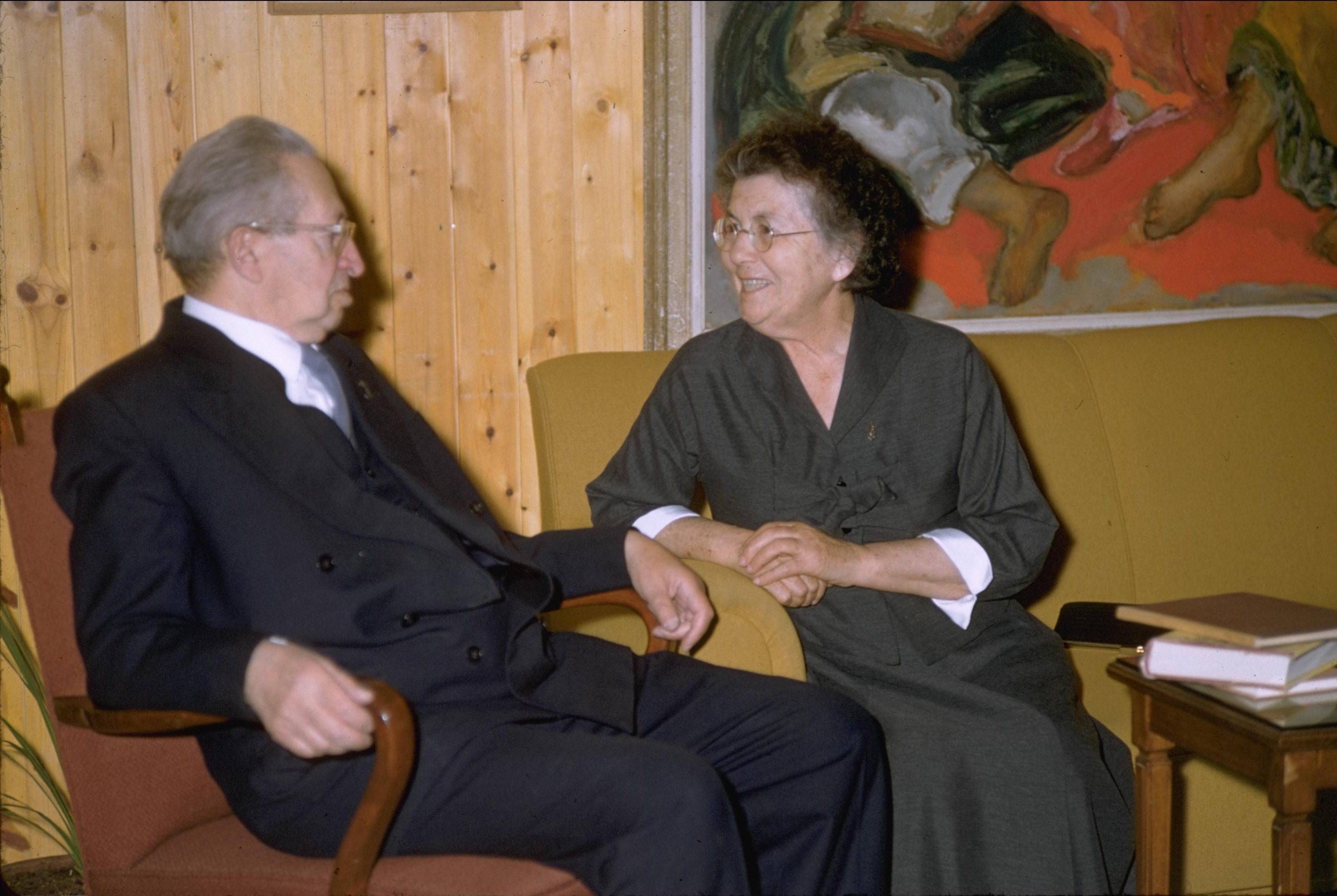

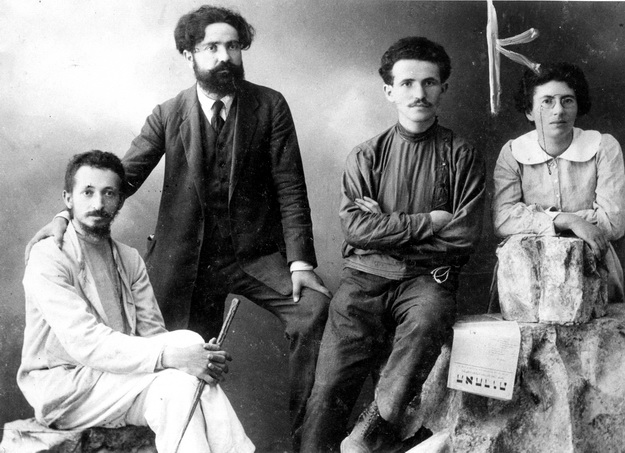

== See also ==
- List of Bialik Prize recipients
