= Ya'akov Zerubavel =

Russian-born Zionist activist and writer; leader of Poale Zion movement

- יעקב זרובבל
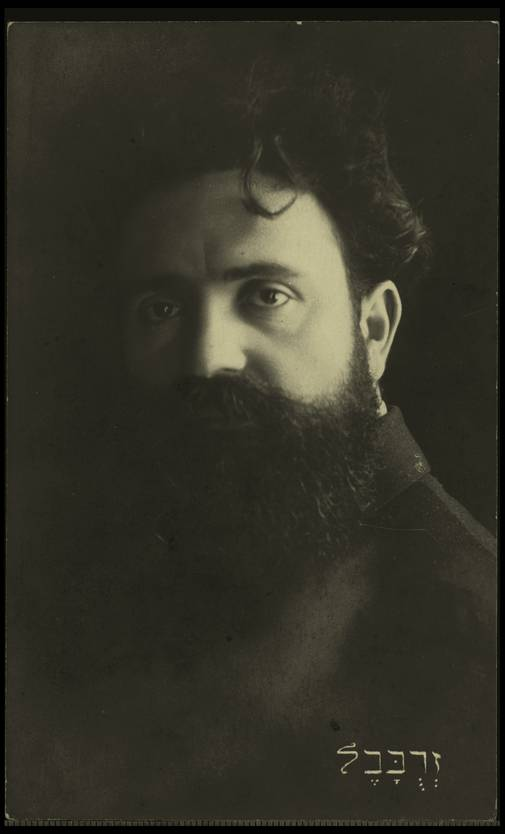
- Born: January 14, 1886; Poltava, Russian Empire
- Died: June 2, 1967 (aged 81); Israel
- Other names: Jacob Vitkin, Jacob Zerubavel
- Political party: Poale Zion, Mapam

Ya'akov Zerubavel (Hebrew: יעקב זרובבל; January 14, 1886 – June 2, 1967) was a Jewish Zionist activist, writer, publisher, and one of the leaders of the Poale Zion movement.

== Biography ==
Ya'akov (Vitkin) Zerubavel was born in Poltava in the Russian Empire (now in Ukraine). As a boy, he studied in a heder.

== Zionist activism ==
As a young man, he joined the Poale Zion movement and was elected to its executive board in 1906. Zerubavel was a central member of the party in Vilna and a member of the party's central committee in Russia. After helping fellow Zionist Ber Borochov publish an underground newspaper, Zerubavel moved to Vilna. He spent 18 months in prison before moving to Lvov, where he worked on the editorial board of the Yiddish newspaper Der Yiddisher Arbeter.

== Political career ==
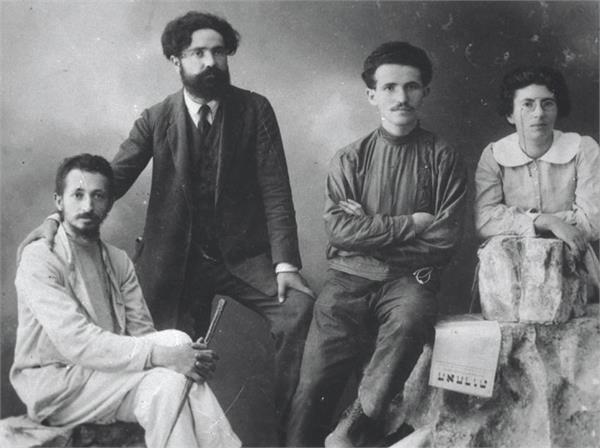
Ben Zvi, Zerubavel, Ben Gurion & Yanaita Ben Zvi 1911

In 1910 Zerubavel immigrated to Palestine, where he became one of the leaders of the Poale Zion movement along with David Ben-Gurion and Yitzhak Ben-Zvi. Zerubavel was sentenced to prison by Ottoman authorities during World War I, but he managed to escape and fled to the United States in 1915. Zerubavel returned to Russia following the October Revolution in 1917, becoming a member of the National Jewish Council of Ukraine. He returned to Poland in 1918, where he served as a leader of the Poale Zion and edited a Yiddish newspaper. In 1935 Zerubavel was allowed by British Mandatory authorities to return to Palestine. He served on the executive committee of the Histadrut, whose labor archive he directed beginning in 1951.

In 1949 he became a member of the Palestine Zionist Executive, and helped found the Mapam party.

== Views and opinions ==
Zerubavel was a strong proponent of the Yiddish language, sharing the view of many left-wing Zionists that Hebrew was the language of intellectuals, and therefore not suitable to the party's goal of reaching the primarily Yiddish-speaking masses abroad.
