= List of Guggenheim Fellowships awarded in 2011 =

Guggenheim Fellowships have been awarded annually since 1925, by the John Simon Guggenheim Memorial Foundation to those "who have demonstrated exceptional capacity for productive scholarship or exceptional creative ability in the arts."

Fellow	Category	Field of Study
Walter L. Adamson	Humanities	Italian History
David Adjmi	Creative Arts	Drama and Performance Art
Ann Agee	Creative Arts	Fine Arts
Arun Agrawal	Natural Sciences	Geography and Environmental Studies
Karen J. Alter	Humanities	Law
Gregory Amenoff	Creative Arts	Fine Arts
Thomas George Andrews	Humanities	United States History
Janine Antoni	Creative Arts	Fine Arts
Judith Barry	Creative Arts	Fine Arts
Shahzad Bashir	Humanities	Near Eastern Studies
Cynthia Beall	Social Sciences	Anthropology and Cultural Studies
Sven Beckert	Humanities	United States History
Seyla Benhabib	Social Sciences	Political Science
James Mark Biederman	Creative Arts	Fine Arts
Eula Biss	Creative Arts	General Nonfiction
Philippe Bodin	Creative Arts	Music Composition
Elizabeth Stinette Bolman	Humanities	Fine Arts Research
Pascal Boyer	Social Sciences	Anthropology
Katherine Bradford	Creative Arts	Fine Arts
Deborah Brandt	Social Sciences	Education
Rick Briggs	Creative Arts	Fine Arts
Richard Brookhiser	Creative Arts	Biography
Vincent Brown	Humanities	African Studies
William Brundage	Humanities	United States History
Stephen Budiansky	Creative Arts	General Nonfiction
Bonnie Jo Campbell	Creative Arts	Fiction
Beth Campbell	Creative Arts	Fine Arts
Peter Campion	Creative Arts	Poetry
Mary Cappello	Creative Arts	General Nonfiction
Pat Catterson	Creative Arts	Choreography
Ananya Chatterjea	Creative Arts	Choreography
Jeffrey Jerome Cohen	Humanities	Medieval Literature
Alon Confino	Humanities	German and East European History
Dalton Conley	Social Sciences	Sociology
Brian P. Copenhaver	Humanities	Philosophy
Chaya Czernowin	Creative Arts	Music Composition
John-Philip D'Agata	Creative Arts	General Nonfiction
Paolo D'Odorico	Social Sciences	Geography and Environmental Studies
Jonathan Dee	Creative Arts	Fiction
DD Dorvillier	Creative Arts	Choreography
David Eagleman	Natural Sciences	Neuroscience
Janet S. Echelman	Creative Arts	Fine Arts
Claudia Emerson	Creative Arts	Poetry
Jean Ensminger	Social Sciences	Economics
Robert Faggen	Humanities	American Literature
R. M. Fischer	Creative Arts	Fine Arts
David Fiuczynski	Creative Arts	Music Composition
Grace S. Fong	Humanities	Literary Criticism
Caroline Cole Ford	Humanities	French History
Katherine Franke	Social Sciences	Law
Estelle Brenda Freedman	Humanities	United States History
Stephen Anthony Gardbaum	Social Sciences	Constitutional Studies
Charles Goldman	Creative Arts	Fine Arts
Michael Gordin	Humanities	History of Science and Technology
Paul Guest	Creative Arts	Poetry
Michelle Handelman	Creative Arts	Film and Video
Duncan Hannah	Creative Arts	Fine Arts
Maria Hassabi	Creative Arts	Choreography
Wil Haygood	Creative Arts	General Nonfiction
Jonathan Haynes	Humanities	Film, Video, and Radio Studies
Agnes Weiyun He	Social Sciences	Anthropology and Cultural Studies
Jeffrey Gardner Heath	Humanities	Linguistics
Anne D. Hedeman	Humanities	Medieval History
Ursula K. Heise	Humanities	Intellectual and Cultural History
Corin Hewitt	Creative Arts	Fine Arts
Fred Ho	Creative Arts	Music Composition
Christie Anne Hodgen	Humanities	Fiction
Adina Hoffman	Creative Arts	General Nonfiction
Michael Keith Honey	Humanities	Folklore and Popular Culture
Don Wayne Howard	Creative Arts	Film and Video
Earl M. Howard	Creative Arts	Music Composition
George Hutchinson	Humanities	American Literature
Doug Leonard James	Natural Sciences	Computer Science
Kirk Richard Johnson	Natural Sciences	Science Writing
Kimberly Johnson	Creative Arts	Poetry
Ann Maret Jones	Creative Arts	General Nonfiction
Tom Kalin	Creative Arts	Film and Video
Benjamin Kaplan	Humanities	Renaissance History
Louis Karchin	Creative Arts	Music Composition
Karolina Karlic	Creative Arts	Photography
Kasumi .	Creative Arts	Film and Video
Patrick John Keeling	Natural Sciences	Molecular and Cellular Biology
Bruce A. Kimball	Social Sciences	Education
Matthew Kirschenbaum	Humanities	Literary Criticism
Amy Beth Kirsten	Creative Arts	Music Composition
Marwan Kraidy	Humanities	Near Eastern Studies
Christopher Landreth	Creative Arts	Film and Video
Lorenz Martin Lüthi	Humanities	German and East European History
Young Jean Lee	Creative Arts	Drama and Performance Art
Richard A. Leo	Creative Arts	General Nonfiction
Eleanor Lerman	Creative Arts	Poetry
Todd Lewis	Humanities	Religion
Jonathan Scott Lowenstein	Creative Arts	Photography
Bernie B. Lubell	Creative Arts	Fine Arts
Peter Lucas	Creative Arts	Film and Video
Rosemary Mahoney	Creative Arts	General Nonfiction
Maurice Walker Manning	Creative Arts	Poetry
Clancy Martin	Creative Arts	Fiction
Valerie Martin	Creative Arts	Fiction
Andrew Masullo	Creative Arts	Fine Arts
Bruce Raymond McClure	Creative Arts	Film and Video
Jennifer McCoy	Creative Arts	Film and Video
Kevin McCoy	Creative Arts	Film and Video
Tara McKelvey	Creative Arts	General Nonfiction
Monica Medina	Natural Sciences	Organismic Biology & Ecology
Mark Crispin Miller	Humanities	Folklore and Popular Culture
Mark S. Mizruchi	Social Sciences	Sociology
Isabel P. Montañez	Natural Sciences	Earth Science
Jesus Mora	Creative Arts	Fine Arts
Simon Morrison	Humanities	Music Research
Richard Mosse	Creative Arts	Photography
Sachiko Murata	Humanities	Translation
Heather Shawn Nathans	Humanities	Theater Arts
Eric Matthew Nelson	Social Sciences	Political Science
Fallou Ngom	Humanities	African Studies
Pipo Hieu Nguyen-duy	Creative Arts	Photography
Lynn K. Nyhart	Humanities	History of Science and Technology
Fiorenzo Omenetto	Natural Sciences	Engineering
Sarah Perin Otto	Natural Sciences	Organismic Biology & Ecology
Heidi Pauwels	Humanities	South Asian Studies
Jonathan Pieslak	Humanities	Music Research
Kevin M. F. Platt	Humanities	Russian History
John M. G. Plotz	Humanities	English Literature
Dimitris N. Politis	Natural Sciences	Statistics
Bjorn Poonen	Natural Sciences	Mathematics
Bill Porter	Humanities	Translation
Endi E. Poskovic	Creative Arts	Fine Arts
D. A. Powell	Creative Arts	Poetry
Katherine Russell Rich	Creative Arts	General Nonfiction
Bruce Robbins	Humanities	Literary Criticism
Jennifer Ellen Robertson	Humanities	East Asian Studies
Arthur John Robson	Social Sciences	Economics
Flash Rosenberg	Creative Arts	Film and Video
Charles Ross	Creative Arts	Fine Arts
Jennifer Prah Ruger	Natural Sciences	Medicine and Health
Karen Elizabeth Russell	Creative Arts	Fiction
Rafe Sagarin	Natural Sciences	Organismic Biology & Ecology
Re'em Sari	Natural Sciences	Astronomy—Astrophysics
Jay Scheib	Creative Arts	Drama and Performance Art
Betsy Schneider	Creative Arts	Photography
Jeffrey A. Segal	Social Sciences	Political Science
Catherine Moira Sharkey	Social Sciences	Law
Marilyn Shrude	Creative Arts	Music Composition
Seth Michael Shulman	Natural Sciences	Science Writing
Lisa Beth Sigal	Creative Arts	Fine Arts
Manuel Sosa	Creative Arts	Music Composition
Olaf Sporns	Natural Sciences	Neuroscience
Alicia Elsbeth (A.E.) Stallings	Creative Arts	Poetry
Alan Stewart	Humanities	English Literature
T. J. Stiles	Creative Arts	Biography
David Stuart	Social Sciences	Anthropology and Cultural Studies
Sanjay Subrahmanyam	Humanities	Intellectual and Cultural History
Kenneth Sanders Suslick	Natural Sciences	Chemistry
Renee Elizabeth Tajima-Penã	Creative Arts	Film and Video
Pam Tanowitz	Creative Arts	Choreography
Vahid Tarokh	Natural Sciences	Applied Mathematics
Steven Michael Tipton	Humanities	Religion
Ray Troll	Natural Sciences	Science Writing
Monika Trümper	Humanities	Classics
Aleh Tsyvinski	Social Sciences	Economics
Katherine M. Turczan	Creative Arts	Photography
Toby Twining	Creative Arts	Music Composition
Penelope Umbrico	Creative Arts	Photography
Deborah M. Valenze	Humanities	British History
Eric J. Van Young	Humanities	Iberian and Latin American History
David James Vann	Creative Arts	Fiction
Lara Vapnyar	Creative Arts	Fiction
Vijay Vazirani	Natural Sciences	Computer Science
Stephen Vitiello	Creative Arts	Fine Arts
Patricia Volk	Creative Arts	General Nonfiction
Louis Warren	Humanities	United States History
Brad Watson	Creative Arts	Fiction
Susan Verdi Webster	Humanities	Fine Arts Research
Tom Wells	Creative Arts	General Nonfiction
Kath Weston	Social Sciences	Anthropology and Cultural Studies
Randy Weston	Creative Arts	Music Composition
Martin White	Natural Sciences	Physics
John M. Willis	Creative Arts	Photography
Linda Trinkaus Zagzebski	Humanities	Philosophy
Matthew J. Zapruder	Creative Arts	Poetry
Cynthia Zarin	Creative Arts	Poetry
Judith Zeitlin	Humanities	East Asian Studies
Marina Zurkow	Creative Arts	Film and Video
Susana Villalba	Creative Arts	Poetry
Francisco Urbano	Natural Sciences	Neuroscience
Marcelo Yanovsky	Natural Sciences	Plant Sciences
Manuela Zoccali	Natural Sciences	Physical Science
Claudia Acuña	Creative Arts	General Nonfiction
Adriana Barenstein	Creative Arts	Choreography
Mónica Bernabé	Humanities	Literary Studies
Damaris Calderón	Creative Arts	Poetry
Tania Candiani	Creative Arts	Fine Arts
Antonio Bernardo Carvalho	Natural Sciences	Organismic Biology and Ecology
Eduardo Castaño	Natural Sciences	Medicine and Health
Oswaldo Chinchilla Mazariegos	Social Sciences	Anthropology
Milagros de la Torre	Creative Arts	Photography
Fabio Ariel Doctorovich	Natural Sciences	Chemistry
Matias Duville	Creative Arts	Fine Arts
Raquel Gil Montero	Humanities	History
Eduardo Halfon	Creative Arts	Fiction
Mario Hamuy	Natural Sciences	Physical Science
Esteban Jobbágy	Social Sciences	Geography and Environmental Studies
Claudia Joskowicz	Creative Arts	Film-Video
Sebastián Lelio	Creative Arts	Film-Video
Natalia Majluf	Humanities	History
Marcus Melo	Social Sciences	Political Science
Pedro Palou	Creative Arts	Fiction
Gustavo Paratcha	Natural Sciences	Molecular & Cellular Biology
Pedro Querejazu	Humanities	Fine Arts Research
José Quiroga	Humanities	Literary Studies
Andrés Rivera	Natural Sciences	Earth Science
Catalina Romero	Social Studies	Political Science
Alejandro Rosas	Humanities	Philosophy
