= Ensminger =

Ensminger may refer to:

- Jean Ensminger, American social scientist
- Chris Ensminger (born 1973), American basketball coach and former player
- Death of Janey Ensminger (1976–1985), died from contaminated drinking water
- John Ensminger (disambiguation), several people
- Steve Ensminger (born 1958), American football coach and former player
