= Peter Lucas =

Peter Lucas may refer to:

- Peter Lucas (footballer) (1929–2019), former Australian rules footballer
- Peter Lucas (rower) (1933–2001), former New Zealand rower
- Peter J. Lucas (born 1962), Polish and American actor
- Peter J. A. Lucas (1914–1994), British soldier awarded the Military Cross
- Peter Lucas (documentary film-maker), a 2011 Guggenheim Fellow
- Peter Lucas (computer scientist) (1935–2015), Austrian computer scientist
- Peter Lucas (rugby union) (born 1956), Australian rugby union player
