= Scythia =

Region of Eurasia defined in antiquity

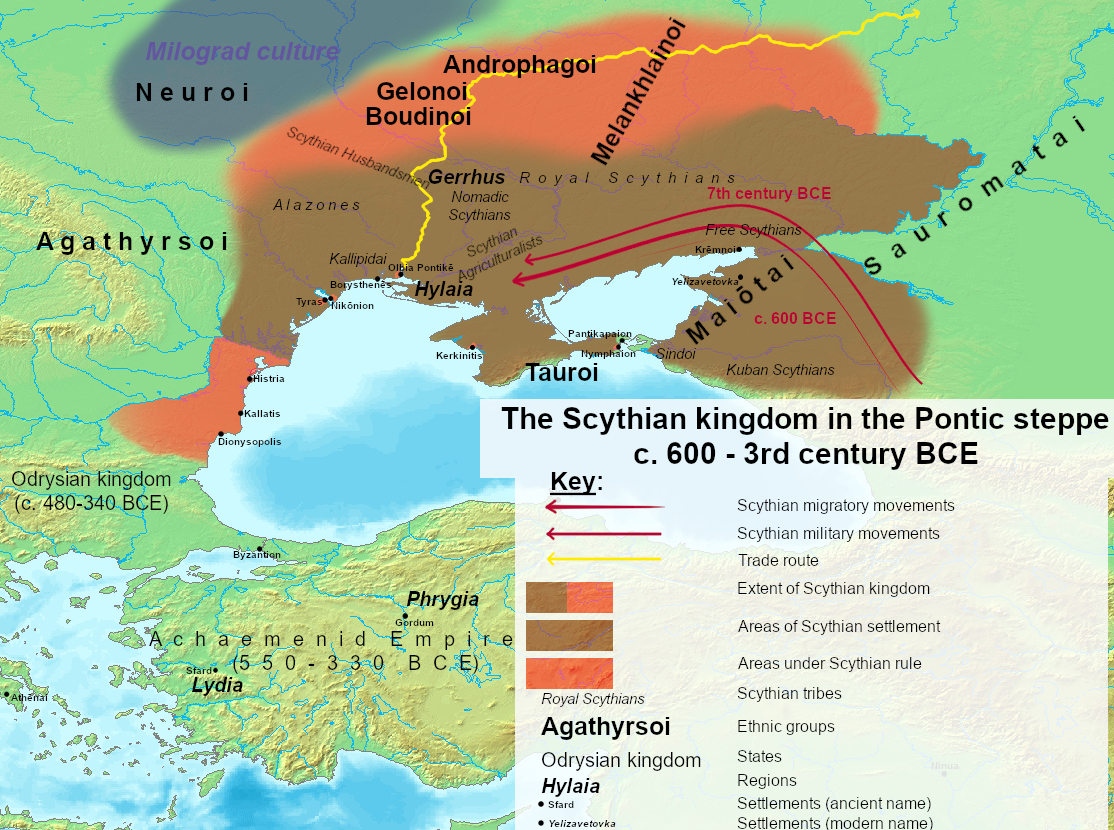
The maximum extent of Pontic Scythia.

Scythia (UK: /ˈsɪðiə/, also US: /ˈsɪθiə/) or Scythica (UK: /ˈsɪðikə/, also US: /ˈsɪθikə/) was a geographic region defined in the ancient Graeco-Roman world that encompassed the Pontic steppe. It was inhabited by Scythians, an ancient Eastern Iranic equestrian nomadic people.

== Etymology ==
The names Scythia and Scythica are themselves Latinisations of the Ancient Greek names Skuthia (Σκυθία) and Skuthikē (Σκυθική), which were themselves derived from the ancient Greek names for the Scythians, Skuthēs (Σκύθης) and Skuthoi (Σκύθοι), derived from the Scythian endonym *Skuδa.

== Geography ==
=== Scythia proper ===
The territory of the Scythian kingdom of the Pontic steppe extended from the Don river in the east to the Danube river in the west, and covered the territory of the treeless steppe immediately north of the Black Sea's coastline, which was inhabited by nomadic pastoralists, as well as the fertile black-earth forest-steppe area to the north of the treeless steppe, which was inhabited by an agricultural population. The northern border of this Scythian kingdom were the deciduous woodlands, while several rivers, including Don and Dnipro, flowed southwards across this region and emptied into the Black Sea.

Between the 9th and 5th centuries BCE, the climate in the steppes was cool and dry, which was a catalyst for the emergence of equestrian nomadic pastoralism in the northern Pontic region. The climate became warmer and wetter during the 5th century BCE, which allowed the steppe nomads to move into the steppes proper.

In these favourable climatic conditions, grass grew abundantly on the treeless steppe and permitted the nomadic Scythians to rear large herds of cattle and horses. The country which the Greeks named Hylaea (Ancient Greek: Ὑλαία, romanized: Hulaía, lit. 'the Woodland'), consisting of the region of the lower Dnipro river along the territory of what is modern-day Kherson and the valleys further north along the river, was covered with forests. Conditions in the southern lands near the shores of the Black Sea were propitious for agriculture.

Before the arrival of the Scythians, this region of the Pontic Steppe was dominated by the Agathyrsi, who were nomadic Iranic people related to the Scythians. The Scythian migration pushed the Agathyrsi westwards, away from the steppes and from their original home around Lake Maeotis, and into the Carpathian region.

Beginning in the late 4th century BCE, another related nomadic Iranic people, the Sarmatians, moved from the east into the Pontic steppe, where they replaced the Scythians as the dominant power of the Pontic steppe. Due to the Sarmatian invasion "Sarmatia Europea" (European Sarmatia) replaced "Scythia" as the name for the region.

=== Greater Scythia ===
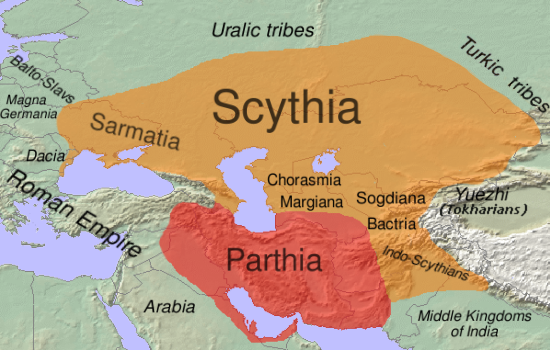
Greater Scythia.

During the Hellenistic period, the use of "Scythia" by Greek and Latin speakers was extended to also cover the southern Russian steppe in general, as well as the entire treeless steppe bounded by the Danubian plains in the west and the Chinese marches in the east.

In contemporary modern scholarship, "Scythian" generally refers to the nomadic Iranic people who dominated the Pontic steppe from the 7th century BCE to the 3rd century BCE, and the name "Scythia" is used to describe this region of the Pontic steppe inhabited by the Scythians.

=== Lesser Scythia ===
Following the Sarmatian invasion, the Scythians fled to two regions which both became known as Lesser Scythia or Little Scythia (Ancient Greek: Μικρά Σκυθία, romanized: Mikrá Skuthía; Latin: Scythia Minor) to the Graeco-Roman world. These corresponded to:

- Crimea until Taurida, as well as the lower Dnipro and the lower Buh rivers,
- and modern-day Dobruja.

The two Lesser Scythias lasted through the 2nd and 1st centuries BCE and the 1st century CE. The Lesser Scythia in Dobruja ceased to exist in the early 1st century BCE, while the settlements of the Lesser Scythia in Crimea were destroyed in the 3rd century CE as a result of the invasion of the Goths, and the Scythians there were finally absorbed by the various peoples who moved into the region during the Migration Period.

== See also ==
- Sarmatia
- Scytho-Siberian world

== Sources ==
- Alekseev, A Yu.; Bokovenko, N.A.; Boltrik, Yu; Chugunov, K.A.; Cook, G.; Dergachev, V.A.; Kovalyukh, N.; Possnert, G.; van der Plicht, J.; Scott, E.M.; Semeetsov, A.; Skripkin, V.; Vasiliev, S.; Zaitseva, G. (2001). "Chronology of Eurasian Scythian Antiquities Born by New Archaeological and C14 Data". Radiocarbon. 43 (2B: Proceedings of the 17th International Radiocarbon Conference (Part 2 of 3), Conference Editors: Israel Carmi, Elisabetta Boaretto): 1085–1107. doi:10.1017/S0033822200041746. hdl:11370/7aaa5cee-12dc-4cd6-a793-9ef547176092.
- Batty, Roger (2007). Rome and the Nomads: The Pontic-Danubian Realm in Antiquity. Oxford: Oxford University Press. ISBN 978-0-198-14936-1.
- Bunker, Emma C. (2002). Nomadic art of the eastern Eurasian steppes: the Eugene V. Thaw and other New York collections. New York: The Metropolitan Museum of Art. ISBN 978-0-300-09688-0.
- Cernenko, E. V. (2012). The Scythians 700–300 BC. Bloomsbury Publishing. ISBN 978-1-78096-773-8.
- Dandamayev, Muhammad (1994). "Media and Achaemenid Iran". In Harmatta, János Harmatta (ed.). History of Civilizations of Central Asia: The Development of Sedentary and Nomadic Civilizations, 700 B. C. to A. D. 250. Vol. 1. UNESCO. pp. 35–64. ISBN 92-3-102846-4.
- Di Cosmo, Nicola (1999). "The Northern Frontier in Pre-Imperial China (1,500 – 221 BC)". In Loewe, Michael; Shaughnessy, Edward L. (eds.). The Cambridge History of Ancient China: From the Origins of Civilization to 221 BC. Cambridge, United Kingdom: Cambridge University Press. pp. 885–996. ISBN 0-521-47030-7.
- Ivantchik, Askold (2018). "Scythians". Encyclopædia Iranica. New York City, United States: Encyclopædia Iranica Foundation; Brill Publishers.
- Jacobson, Esther (1995). The Art of the Scythians: The Interpenetration of Cultures at the Edge of the Hellenic World. BRILL. ISBN 90-04-09856-9.
- Karyshkovskij, Pyotr O. (1988). Монеты Ольвии. Наукова думка. ISBN 5-12-000104-1.
- Khazanov, A.M. (1975). Золото скифов [Social History of Scythians] (in Russian).
- Melyukova, A. I. (1990). "The Scythians and Sarmatians". In Sinor, Denis (ed.). The Cambridge History of Early Inner Asia. Cambridge, United Kingdom: Cambridge University Press. pp. 97–117. ISBN 978-0-521-24304-9.
- Novák, Ľubomír (2013). Problem of Archaism and Innovation in the Eastern Iranian Languages. Prague, Czech Republic: Charles University. Archived from the original on 14 August 2022.
- Olbrycht, Marek Jan (2000). "Remarks on the Presence of Iranian Peoples in Europe and Their Asiatic Relations". In Pstrusińska, Jadwiga [in Polish]; Fear, Andrew (eds.). Collectanea Celto-Asiatica Cracoviensia. Kraków: Księgarnia Akademicka. pp. 101–140. ISBN 978-8-371-88337-8.
- Sulimirski, T. (1985). "The Scyths". In Gershevitch, I. (ed.). The Median and Achaemenian Periods. The Cambridge History of Iran. Vol. 2. Cambridge, United Kingdom: Cambridge University Press. pp. 149–199. ISBN 978-1-139-05493-5.
- Sulimirski, Tadeusz; Taylor, T. F. (1991). "The Scythians". In Boardman, John; Edwards, I. E. S.; Hammond, N. G. L.; Sollberger, E.; Walker, C. B. F. (eds.). The Assyrian and Babylonian Empires and other States of the Near East, from the Eighth to the Sixth Centuries B.C. The Cambridge Ancient History. Vol. 3. Cambridge, United Kingdom: Cambridge University Press. pp. 547–590. ISBN 978-1-139-05429-4.
- Tokhtasyev, Sergey [in Russian] (2005a). "Проблема Скифского Языка в Современной Науке" [The Problem of the Scythian Language in Contemporary Studies]. In Cojocaru, Victor (ed.). Ethnic Contacts and Cultural Exchanges North and West of the Black Sea from the Greek Colonization to the Ottoman Conquest: Proceedings of the International Symposium Ethnic Contacts and Cultural Exchanges North and West of the Black Sea, Iaşi, June 12–17, 2005. Iași, Romania: Trinitas Publishing House; Iași Institute of Archaeology. pp. 59–108. ISBN 978-9-737-83450-8.
- Tokhtasyev, Sergey [in Russian] (2005b). "Sauromatae - Syrmatae - Sarmatae". Херсонесский сборник [Chersonesian Collection] (in Russian). 14: 291–306.
- Unterländer, Martina (March 3, 2017). "Ancestry and Demography and Descendants of Iron Age Nomads of the Eurasian Steppe". Nature Communications. 8 14615. Bibcode:2017NatCo...814615U. doi:10.1038/ncomms14615. PMC 5337992. PMID 28256537.
- West, Stephanie (2002). "Scythians". In Bakker, Egbert J.; de Jong, Irene J. F.; van Wees, Hans (eds.). Brill's Companion to Herodotus. Brill. pp. 437–456. ISBN 978-90-04-21758-4.
