= Sarah Lishansky =

- שרה לישנסקי
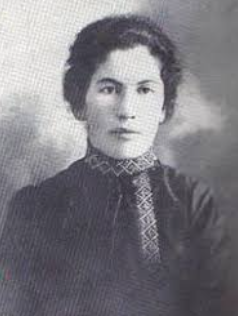
- Born: 1884; Malyn, Rivnens'ka oblast, Ukraine
- Died: 8 August 1924 (aged 39–40); Jerusalem, Israel

Sarah Lishansky (Hebrew: שרה לישנסקי; 1884–1924) was an Israeli nurse, born in Ukraine, who founded the first clinic of Clalit Health Services.

== Early life and education in the Ukraine ==
Sarah Lishansky was born in 1884 in Malyn, in the Russian Empire (now in Ukraine) to Shoshanna (1865–1944) and Meir Yonah Lishansky (1862–1942).

Lishansky had three younger sisters: Rachel, Tamar, and Batia. Her sister Rachel was the wife of Yitzhak Ben-Zvi, Israel's second president; her sister Batia was an Israeli sculptor who received the Israel Prize for sculpture (1985), the Dizengoff Prize for sculpture (in 1944 and 1957), and was named an honorary citizen of Tel Aviv (1983); and her sister Tamar was a physician.

In Ukraine, she received her education in a girls' elementary school, where she studied Russian and arithmetic and also read classic Russian literature. Together with her friends, she founded an association called "Mishanah" to support the poor.

From 1904 to 1906, Lishansky attended a course for nurses at the government hospital in Kiev. When her parents forced her into marriage at the age of sixteen, Right after the wedding, she fled the house and did not return until morning, and from that moment on, she completely ignored the husband who had been imposed on her. After a few months, the man went his way, and years later, while she was studying in Kyiv, he gave her a divorce through her sister, Tamar.

== Life in Israel ==
Lishansky was involved in the Poale Zion movement along with her sister Rachel, and also founded a Jewish school in the town. She was one of the first pioneer women in Israel.

Lishansky initially worked as a nurse at the Misgav Ladach Hospital in Jerusalem and later at the local government hospital.

Before the outbreak of World War I, she left Jerusalem and worked as a nurse in Karkur. When the Turks expelled the Jews from Tel Aviv-Jaffa in 1917, the parents of Lishansky moved to the moshav Tel Adashim in the Jezreel Valley. The residents of this community, who were then members of Ha-Shomer, invited Lishansky to serve as their nurse.

Later, she returned to live in Jerusalem, where she worked as a nurse at Clalit Health Services. She became an active member of the Ahdut HaAvoda party and was elected to the city council of Jewish Jerusalem, to the first assembly of elected officials, and to various councils.

In 1920, she moved to Tel Aviv and was involved in the founding of the "Clalit Health Fund of the Hebrew Workers in the Land of Israel" As an active member of the central health fund, she was one of the founders of the first clinic of the health fund in Tel Aviv.

=== Death ===
Lishansky fell ill with cancer. In an attempt to recover, she traveled to Vienna and Berlin, where she healed. She returned to Eretz Israel and resumed her work, but the cancer reappeared. After several months of struggle, she died in Jerusalem.

== Legacy ==
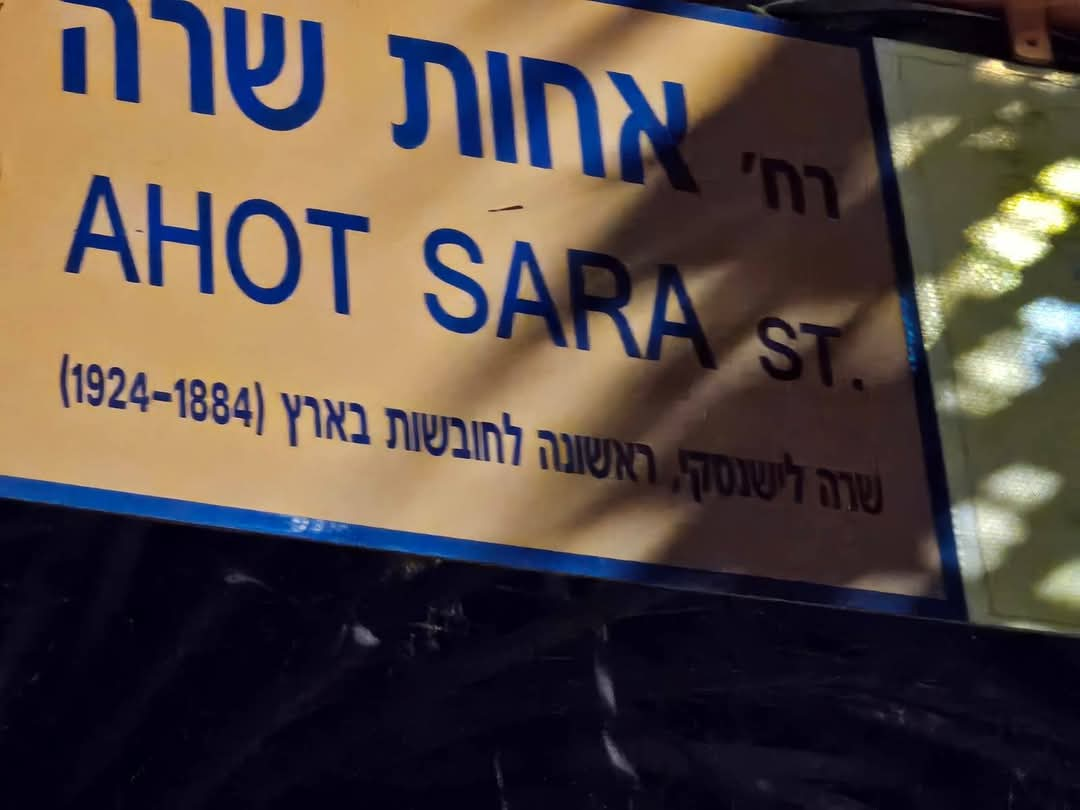
Street named after Sarah Lishansky

A book was written about her life titled האחות (HaOchot, meaning "The Nurse" in Hebrew).

A street is named after Lishansky.

The cultural hall "Ohel Sarah" in Tel Adashim was erected in her honour.

== See also ==
- Yitzhak Ben-Zvi
- Batia Lishansky
- Rachel Yanait Ben-Zvi
