= Jesús Mora =

Jesús Mora may refer to:

- Jesuli (born Jesús Antonio Mora Nieto), a Spanish footballer
- Jesús Mora (baseball), a Venezuelan ballplayer
- Jesus Mora (artist), a 2011 Guggenheim Fellowship recipient
