= Rachel Yanait Ben-Zvi =

Israeli author and educator (1886–1979)

- רחל ינאית בן־צבי
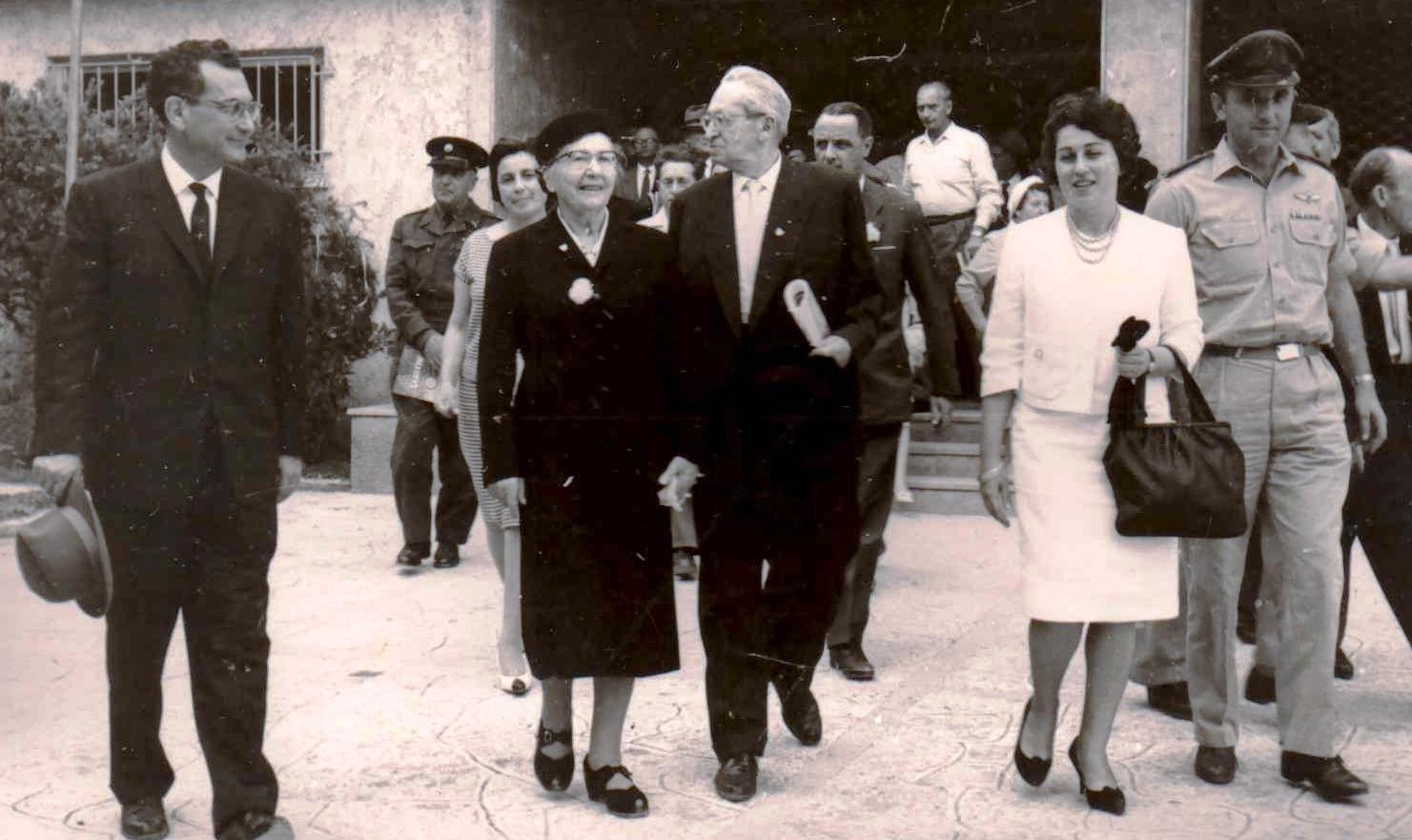
- Ben-Zvi with her husband (centre) on a visit to Rehovot
- Born: Golda Lishansky; May 1886; Malyn, Radomyslsky Uyezd, Kiev Governorate, Russian Empire (now Ukraine)
- Died: 16 November 1979 (aged 93)
- Occupations: Author, educator
- Known for: Labor Zionist; First Lady of Israel
- Awards: Israel Prize (1978)

Rachel Yanait Ben-Zvi (Hebrew: רחל ינאית בן־צבי; May 1886 – 16 November 1979) was an Israeli author and educator, and a leading Labor Zionist. Ben-Zvi was the wife of the second President of Israel, Yitzhak Ben-Zvi.

== Biography ==
Rachel Yanait was born Golda Lishansky in the town of Malyn, Radomyslsky Uyezd of the Kiev Governorate of the Russian Empire (now Ukraine) Shoshanna (1865–1944) and Meir Yonah Lishansky (1862–1942). She had three sisters: Sarah Lishansky, founder of the first clinic of Clalit Health Services; Tamar, a doctor, and the sculptress Batia Lishansky.

As a teenager in Kiev she joined the newly formed underground Marxist/Zionist party, Poale Zion. She supported herself while studying by teaching Hebrew. In 1904 she was amongst a group of 16 young people arrested after a clandestine meeting. She was held for several months in Lukyanivska Prison for being a Jew in Kiev without a permit.

The following year, while studying agriculture in France, she was chosen as the Poale Zion delegate from Malyn to the Seventh Zionist Congress in Basel. After the Congress she accompanied Ber Borochov on a visit to the leader of the German Zionist Organisation in Berlin, Dr Arthur Hantke. They persuaded him to fund the purchase of some guns which they smuggled back to Kiev.

In 1908, she emigrated to Palestine, which was then under the rule of the Ottoman Empire. She was one of the founding members of Poale Zion in Palestine. In Jerusalem she gave classes on Josephus at the Hebrew Gymnasium high school. The following year she and Yitzhak Ben Zvi took part in the first meeting of Hashomer, the Jewish underground militia. In 1911 she studied agriculture at the University of Grenoble. On graduating she returned to Palestine. During the First World War she was the only leader of Poale Zion who remained in Palestine. After the war she changed her name to Yanait, after the Hashmonean king Alexander Yannai. In 1918, she married Ben-Zvi, leader Poale Zion and co-founder of Hashomer. They had two sons together.

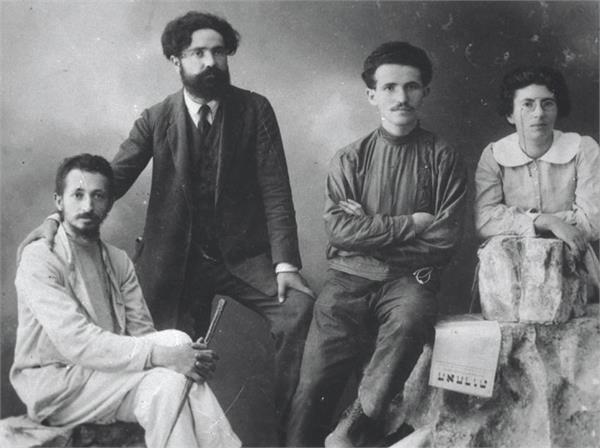
Ben Zvi, Zerubavel, Ben Gurion & Yanait Ben Zvi 1911

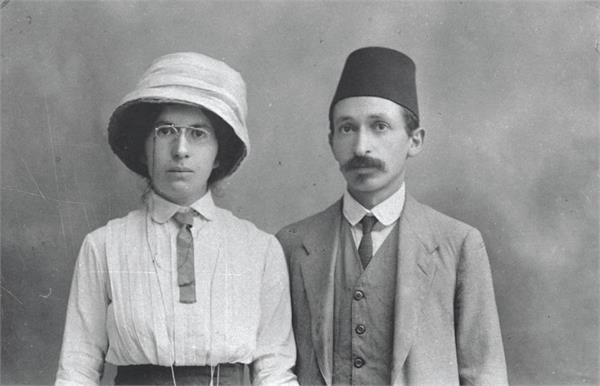
Rachel Yanait with Yitzhak Ben Zvi 1913

After World War I, she founded "The Educational Farm" in Jerusalem; a farm that provided agricultural education for women. She was among the founders of "The Hebrew Gymnasium" in Jerusalem and remained a labor activist. She was also active in the Haganah paramilitary organization and organized the clandestine aliyah of immigrants through Syria and Lebanon.

Her son, Eli, was killed in March 1948 at Beit Keshet during the civil war in Mandatory Palestine.

After the founding of the State of Israel, she was active in the absorption of immigrants from Arab countries.

In 1952, her husband was appointed the president of Israel. As the first lady of Israel, she opened the president's house to people from all the strata of Israeli society. During that time, she wrote about education and defense and wrote an autobiography called We are Olim (אנו עולים / anu olim), which was published in 1961.

In 1978, Ben-Zvi was awarded the Israel Prize for her special contribution to society and the State of Israel. She died on 16 November 1979.

== See also ==
- List of Israel Prize recipients
