= Batia Lishansky =

Israeli sculptor (1900–1992)

- בתיה לישנסקי
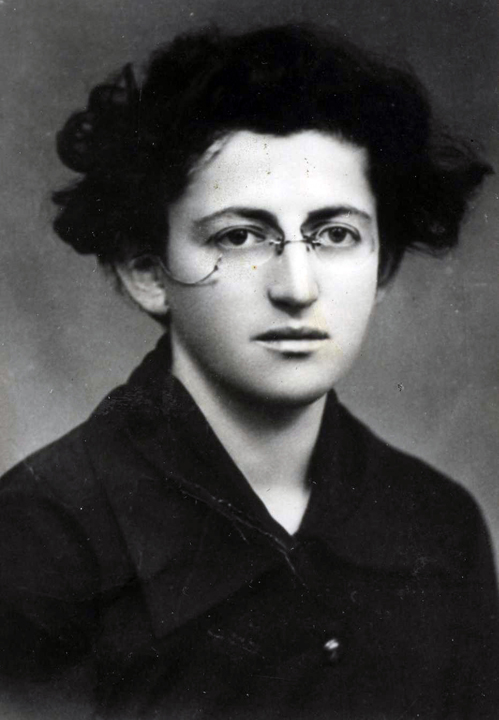
- Batia Lishansky (1920)
- Born: 1900; Malyn, Russian Empire
- Died: 1992 (aged 91–92); Tel Aviv, Israel
- Citizenship: Israel
- Occupation: Sculptor
- Notable work: Commemorating the Fallen (Kfar Yehoshua, Beit Keshet, Kadoorie Agricultural Village); From Holocaust to Revival (Netzer Sereni)
- Awards: Dizengoff Prize (1944, 1957); Israel Prize (1986)

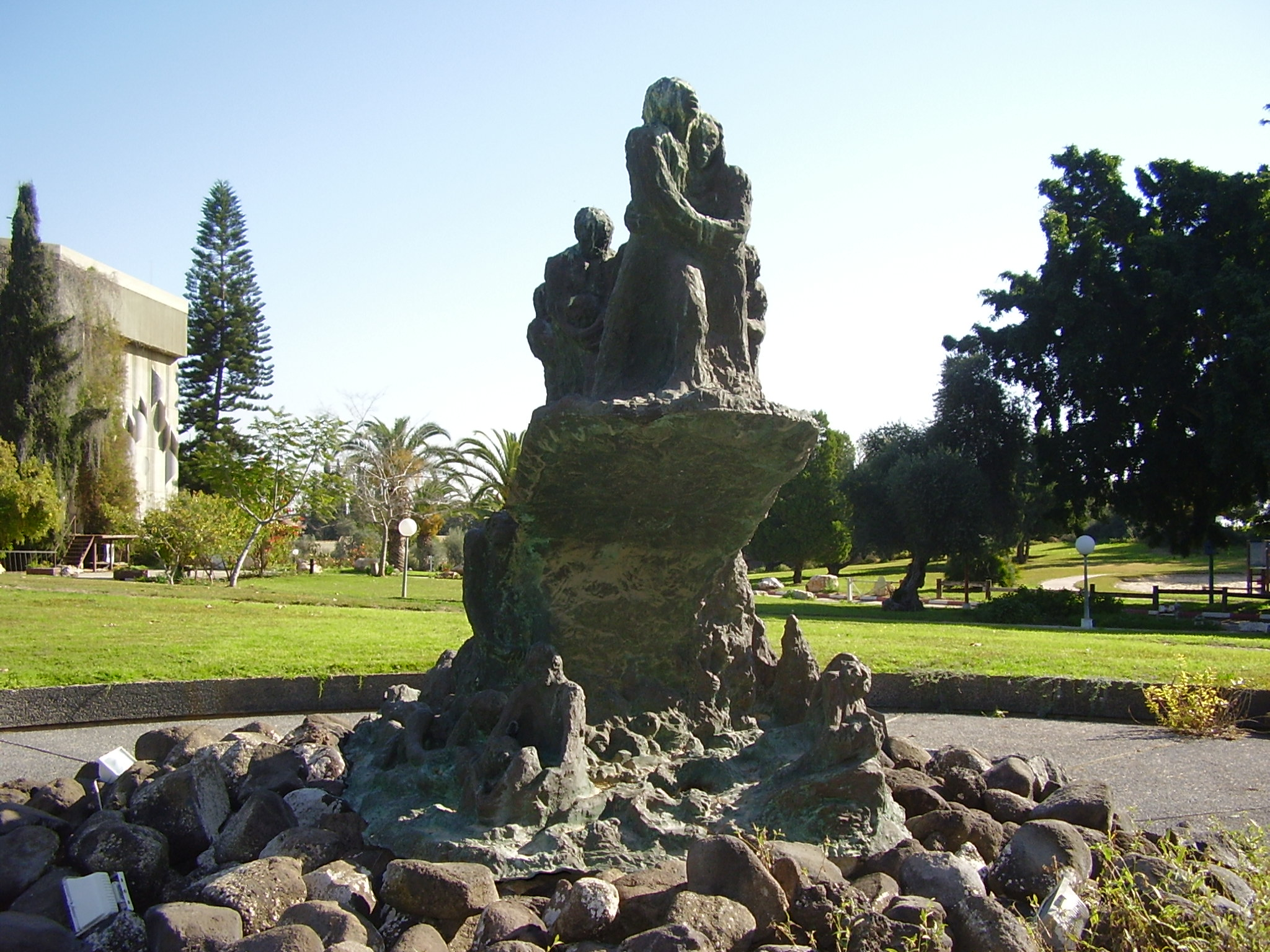
Holocaust memorial at Netzer Sereni

Batia Lishansky, also Batya, Batyah; Lichanski, Lishanski, (Hebrew: בתיה לישנסקי; 1900–1992) was a Russian-born Israeli sculptor. Working with stone, wood and bronze, she created portraits and memorials commemorating the people and events of the early years of the State of Israel. Her many busts portray cultural and political figures as well as members of her family while her monumental memorials are dedicated to those who were killed in the War of Independence. Many of her works can be seen in the permanent exhibition at the Shomer Museum in Kfar Giladi.

== Biography ==
Born in Malyn, Russian Empire, in 1900, Batia Lishansky was the youngest of the four daughters of Shoshanna (1865–1944) and Meir Yonah Lishansky (1862–1942). Her older sisters were Rachel Lishansky, an author and educator who would become the wife of the second President of Israel, Yitzhak Ben-Zvi; Tamar Lishansky, a doctor; and Sarah Lishansky, founder of the first clinic of Clalit Health Services.

After immigrating to Palestine with her mother in 1910, she studied for a year at the Bezalel Institute under Boris Schatz. She then spent a period at the Rome Academy of Fine Arts but returned to Palestine in 1921, settling at the Ein Harod kibbutz and exhibiting her early wood sculptures. In 1923, she went to Berlin where she studied for three years before spending a further three years at the Academy of Painting and Sculpture in Paris. She returned to Palestine in 1929.

Batia Lishansky died in Tel Aviv in 1992.

== Art career ==
In a style ranging from expressiveness to realism, her early works were influenced by Auguste Rodin and Camille Claudel. Among the hundreds of busts she created of historic Israeli figures are those of prime ministers David Ben-Gurion, Menahem Begin and Golda Meir. However, she is known above all for her memorials, including Commemorating the Fallen for those who died in the War of Independence (1947–1949). Depicting heroism and comradeship, the series of three can be found at Kfar Yehoshua, Beit Keshet and Kadoorie Agricultural Village. Her memorial "From Holocaust to Revival" is located at Netzer Sereni.

== Awards and recognition ==
Lishansky received the Dizengoff Prize for her contributions to sculpture on two occasions: in 1944 and 1957. In 1986, she was honoured with the Israel Prize for Lifework in Sculpture.

== Personal life ==
Lishansky had been in a relationship with the female painter Annie Neumann.

== See also ==
- Visual arts in Israel
- Women of Israel
