= Friederike Fless =

German classical archaeologist

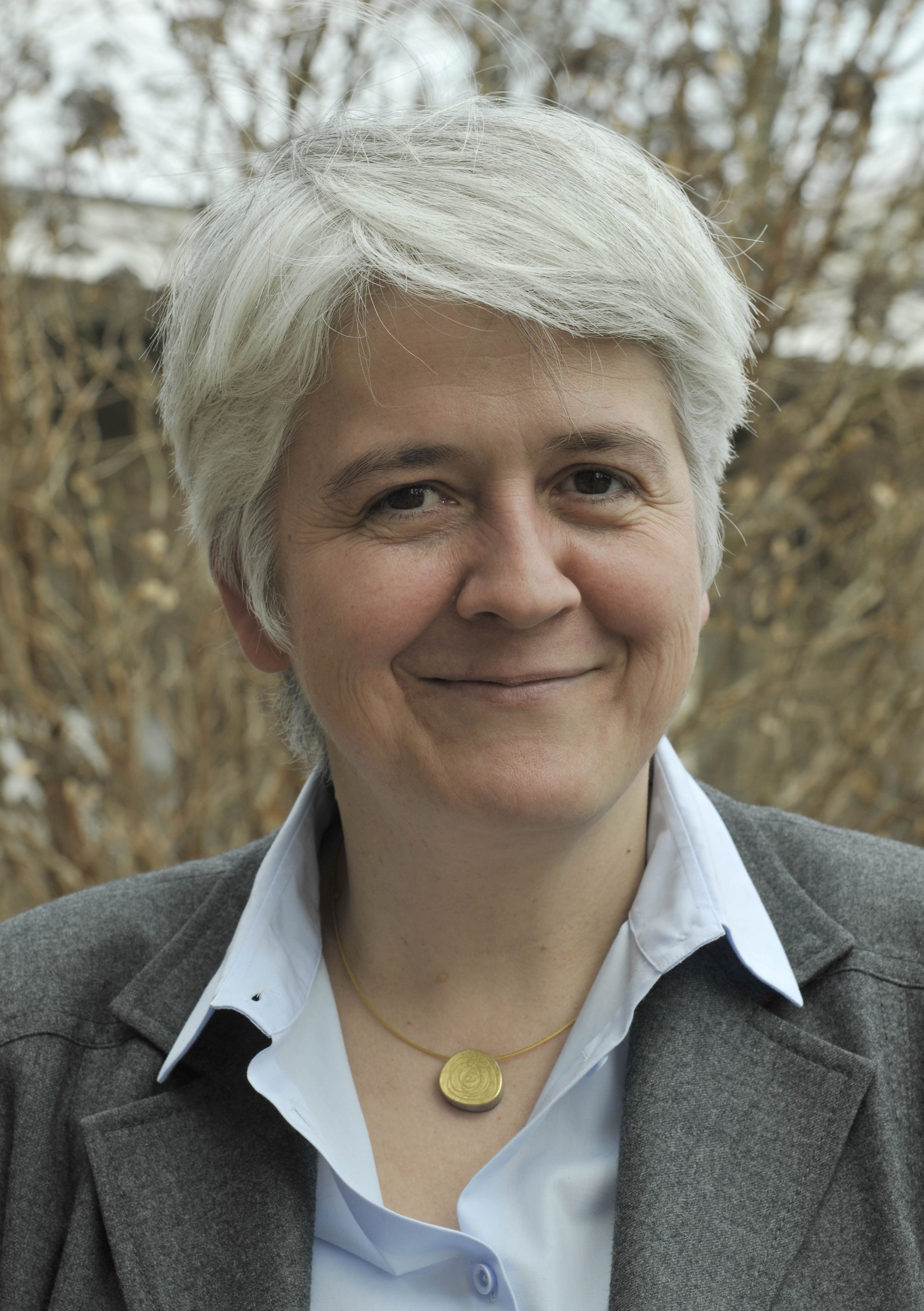
Friederike Fless (2011)

Friederike Fless (born 1964) is a German classical scholar and archaeologist. In 2003, she was appointed professor of classical archaeology at the Free University of Berlin. In March 2011, she became the first woman to be appointed president of the German Archaeological Institute where she is responsible for up to 300 digs and other projects per year. For her outstanding contribution to science and science management, in November 2014 she received an honorary doctorate from the Humboldt University of Berlin.

== Biography ==
Born on 25 May 1964 in Unna, Fless matriculated from the city's Geschwister-Scholl-Gymnasium in 1983. She then studied history of art, ancient history and classical archaeology at the universities of Trier, Würzburg and Mainz. Completing an assignment on Opferdiener und Kultmusiker auf stadtrömischen historischen Reliefs (Sacrificial Servants and Cult Musicians on Historical Reliefs) she graduated from Mainz in 1992, after which she received a travel grant from the Archaeological Institute in 1993.

In 1994, she embarked on research at the University of Cologne, completing work on Überlegungen zu den Formen der Aneignung und den Funktionen attisch-rotfiguriger Vasen im 4. Jh. v. Chr. (Reflections on the forms of appropriation and the functions of Attic red-figure vases in the 4th century BC) which led to her habilitation in 2000 and the corresponding colloquium. After serving as a lecturer for three years at the University of Leipzig, she was appointed professor at the Institute for Classical Archaeology at the Free University of Berlin. She was a major contributor to the Berlin universities' Cluster of Excellence on Topoi – The Formation and Transformation of Space and Knowledge in Ancient Civilizations. In 2011, she became President of the German Archaeology Institute.

In 2014, Fless received an honorary doctorate from the Humboldt University of Berlin.
