= Adriana Barenstein =

Argentine choreographer

Head of the Centro Cultural Ricardo Rojas Department of Dance Theater
- In office 1984–1994

Personal details
- Education: University of Buenos Aires
- Occupation: Choreographer; educator; radio personality
- Awards: Guggenheim Fellow (2011)

Adriana Barenstein is an Argentine choreographer, educator, and radio personality. Her works are focused on human-physical environment interactions. She also served as head of the Centro Cultural Ricardo Rojas Department of Dance Theater from 1984 until 1994.

== Biography ==
Adriana Barenstein was educated at the University of Buenos Aires (UBA), where she studied philosophy. After working at the National School of Dance as a teacher (1979-1985), she returned to UBA, where she formed the Centro Cultural Ricardo Rojas Department of Dance Theater and was head of the former from 1984 until 1994, an era she recalled "was very important for her [and] a dizzying moment". At the Centro Cultural Borgesa, she conceived their Living Arts Area, and she has also directed their workshops and dance school.

Many of her works – particularly the Edward Hopper-inspired Disculpen este prolongado silencio con música (1992), El Amor (2005), and Cuerpo y Ciudad (2010) – focused on human-physical environment interactions. Inspired by the 1997 Festival en el Subte, she began organizing monthly dances inside subway cars and stations as Curator of Dance, Theater, and Music at the Buenos Aires Underground. Some of her works use music from Edgardo Rudnitzky. In a 2000 interview with Diario Río Negro, she said of her projects' aesthetics: "If I say that my creation corresponds to a certain canon, I can't belong to another, I have to stay locked in there, and I don't like that type of choice. I prefer methodologically to define pedagogically."

She was appointed a Guggenheim Fellow in 2011. As part of the fellowship, she worked on the projects Esferas and Cuerpo y entorno.

She has also worked as a radio personality, hosting FM Radio Cultura's La Voz del Laberinto.
