= Yevhen Chernenko =

Ukrainian archaeologist

- Born: 5 October 1934; Buda, Malyn Raion, Zhytomyr Oblast, Ukrainian SSR
- Died: 3 January 2007 (aged 72); Kyiv, Ukraine
- Education: Taras Shevchenko National University of Kyiv
- Known for: Pioneering research on the archaeology of the Scythians
- Scientific career
- Fields: Archaeology
- Institutions: NASU Institute of Archaeology

Yevhen Vasylovych Chernenko (Ukrainian: Євген Васильович Черненко; 5 October 1934 – 3 January 2007) was a Ukrainian archaeologist. He was Professor of Archaeology at the Taras Shevchenko National University of Kyiv and an internationally renowned expert on Scythian archaeology.

== Biography ==
Yevhen Vasylovych Chernenko was born on 5 October 1934 in the village of Buda, Malyn Raion, Zhytomyr Oblast, Ukrainian SSR. During his evacuation to Orenburg Oblast along with his mother in World War II, Chernenko read the works of the German archaeologist Heinrich Schliemann, which greatly impressed him.

Cherneko graduated from the Department of History at the Taras Shevchenko National University of Kyiv in 1958, and was then sent to the Department of Scytho-Ancient Archaeology of the NASU Institute of Archaeology, with which he would be affiliated for the rest of his life. He began his postgraduate studies in 1960 and defended his Ph.D. thesis on Scythian military equipment in 1966.

Since 1970, Chernenko was a research fellow at the NASU Institute of Archaeology. From 1981 to 1986 he was in charge of the Department for the Archaeology of the Early Iron Age. He participated in a number of archaeological expeditions, most notably the 1971 excavation of the Scythian tomb of Tolstaya Mogila.

An internationally renowned scholar, no notable work on Scythian military affairs was published without references to the pioneering work of Chernenko. He was made a Corresponding Member of the German Archaeological Institute in 1988, and awarded the title of Professor in 1992.

Throughout his career, Chernenko published and edited a large number of articles and books. He also supervised doctoral studies at the NASU Institute of Archaeology and the Krymskyi Institute of Eastern Studies.

Chernenko died in Kyiv on 3 January 2007. In accordance with his will, the urn with the ashes of Chernenko were lowered in the Scythian Borysthenes river.

== Sources ==
- Галина Мезенцева. В кн.: Мезенцева Г. Дослідники археології України: Енциклопедичний словник-довідник. Чернігів: вид. «Рада», 1997. — C.146.
