= Dmytro Kozatskyi =

Ukrainian photographer, soldier (born 1995)

- Дмитро Козацький
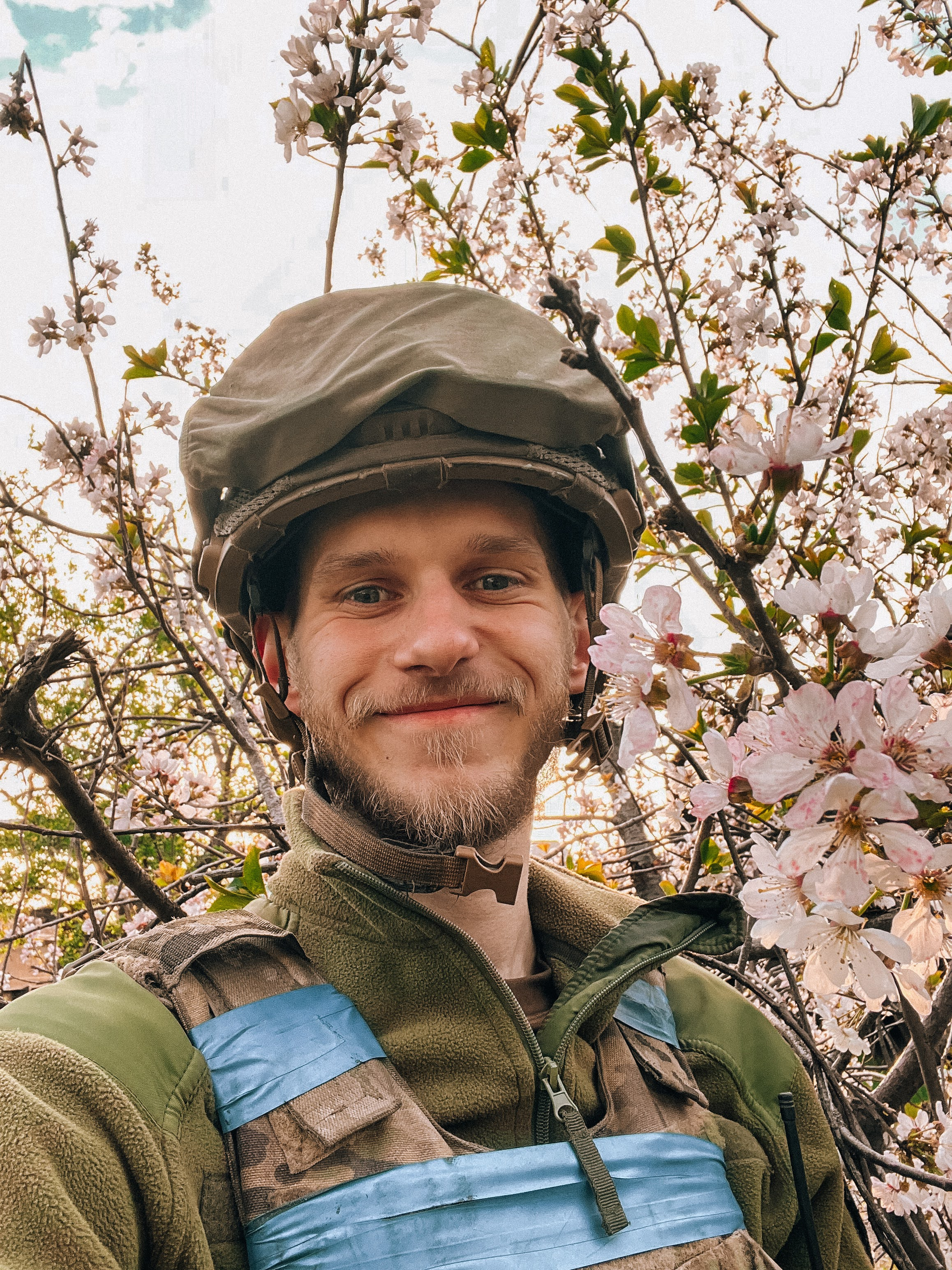
- Kozatskyi in 2022
- Born: 11 November 1995 (age 30); Malyn, Zhytomyr Oblast, Ukraine
- Education: National University of Ostroh Academy
- Occupations: Soldier and photographer, Azov Battalion of the National Guard of Ukraine
- Known for: Photography from the Siege of Mariupol
- Awards: Medal For Military Service to Ukraine (2022), Px3 (2022)

Dmytro Oleksandrovych Kozatskyi, (Ukrainian: Дмитро Олександрович Козацький), also known by his call sign Orest (born 11 November 1995), is a Ukrainian photographer, serviceman, senior soldier, and fighter of the Azov Brigade of the National Guard of Ukraine. He was awarded the Medal For Military Service to Ukraine (2022).

== Biography ==
Dmytro Kozatskyi was born in Malyn on 11 November 1995.

In 2014, he left the Rzeszów University of Information Technology and Management (Poland) to become a participant in the Revolution of Dignity. He is currently a student at the National University of Ostroh Academy.

In 2015 he joined the National Guard of Ukraine, and later joined the Azov Battalion.

=== Russian invasion of Ukraine (2022) ===
Since 2015, he has been a defender of Mariupol in the Donetsk region. During the Siege of Mariupol from 1 March 2022, together with other colleagues, he held the defense at the Azovstal plant.

As the head of the press service of the Azov Regiment, he published 10 photos of wounded colleagues from the field hospital at the plant, which were shared around the world. One of the photos, in which the young man falls under the rays of the May sun, falling inside the destroyed premises of the enterprise through a hole pierced by shells, was called "Light will win."

To the sound of explosions, he sang the song "Stefania" by the Kalush Orchestra, which brought Ukraine victory in the Eurovision 2022 song contest.

On 20 May 2022, before being taken prisoner, Dmytro Kozatskyi published a post on his Twitter: “Well, that's all. Thank you for shelter Azovstal – the place of my death and my life. By the way, while I am in captivity, I will leave you photos in the best quality, send them to all journalistic awards and photo contests, if I win something, it will be very nice after the release. Thank you all for your support. See you.” On the same day, the Vice Speaker of the Ukrainian Parliament Olena Kondratyuk stated that the Verkhovna Rada of Ukraine would send photos of Dmytro Kozatskyi to all parliaments of Europe and the world that are on Ukraine's side. The film association Babylon'13 published a video of the "Mariupol Fortress. The last day in Azovstal", filmed by Dmytro.

He was released from Russian captivity in late September 2022 when 215 Ukrainian military prisoners were exchanged for Viktor Medvedchuk among others. He appeared on Andrea Mitchell Reports, MSNBC on November 2, 2022.

== Awards ==
- Special honor at Grand Press Foundation Gala 2022
- Prix de la Photographie, Paris, gold prize for press/war, second-place winner in press.
- Medal for military service to Ukraine (April 17, 2022) — "for personal courage and selfless actions related to the protection of the state sovereignty and territorial integrity of Ukraine, loyalty to the military oath"

== Controversy ==
He has been accused by Anatoly Shariy and Kayla Popuchet of social media posts displaying symbols tied to Neo-Nazi ideology. Kozatskyi admitted he posted the photographs to Twitter, but denied the allegations of Nazism, and suggested that they were part of a smear campaign.

In October 2022, several photos from Kozatskyi's photo series The Light Will Win were included in an exhibition at the Ferraté Library at the Polytechnic University of Catalonia. On November 13, 2022, Kozatskyi's work was removed from the exhibition and the university released a statement which stated it "wasn't aware of the ideology of the author", and that the university "rejects Nazism and regrets the situation created". Also on November 13, 2022, Kozatskyi was heckled by Kayla Popuchet at Doc NYC where he was an invited speaker. The heckler was forcibly removed.

== Sources ==
- AP PHOTOS: A POW’s legacy of Mariupol siege pictures // East Bay Times, 21 May 2022
- Natalia Liubchenkova, Azov photographer publishes his work just before being taken prisoner // Euronews, 20 May 2022
- "While I am in captivity": military photographer from "Azovstal" showed photos of Ukrainian defenders // ТСН, 20 May 2022
- “Thank you for the shelter, Azovstal — the place of my death and my life” Soldier Dmytro Kozatsky from Azov Regiment released heartbreaking photos of Mariupol defenders
- Ксюша Савоскіна, «Спочатку йде авіабомбардування, а далі обстріл із кораблів. Це безперервний жах». Історія бійця з «Азовсталі» // hromadske, 17 May 2022
- Ольга Скотнікова, «Очі «Азовсталі» — фотограф Орест, що знімав життя захисників, написав з полону // Вечірній Київ, 20 May 2022
- «Місце моєї смерті і мого життя»: захисник Маріуполя показав прощальні світлини з «Азовсталі» // ТСН, 20 May 2022
- Роліна Мірер, Обличчя «Азовсталі». Історії захисників Маріуполя // Суспільне Новини, 18 May 2022
- «Найстрашніше — це втрата побратимів», — Дмитро Козацький, автор світлин поранених з «Азовсталі» // 1+1, 16 May 2022
