= Volodymyr Satsyuk =

Ukrainian intelligence officer

- Володимир Сацюк
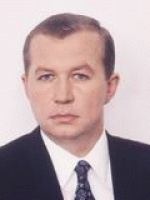
- Born: 11 March 1963 (age 63)
- Occupations: Security official, businessman
- Known for: Alleged involvement in the Viktor Yushchenko poisoning (2004)
- Title: Deputy Chairman of the Security Service of Ukraine

Volodymyr Satsyuk (Ukrainian: Володимир Сацюк) (born 11 March 1963) is the former deputy head of Ukraine’s intelligence agency. He is suspected of involvement in the poisoning of Ukrainian president Viktor Yushchenko in 2004.

== Career ==
Satsyuk was a businessman before he joined the Security Service of Ukraine, where he eventually became the Deputy Chairman.

== Allegations ==
Ukrainian prosecutors, after interviewing over 1,000 people, identified Satsyuk as being potentially involved in the poisoning of Yuschenko with dioxin. Yushchenko had attended a private dinner on 5 September 2004 held at Satsyuk's residence, during that year's Ukrainian presidential elections. He was accompanied by two assistants, Taras Zalessky and Alexei Poletukha, the former vice-president of the JS Bank «Ukraine». According to The Times newspaper, "Ukraine’s pro-Russian government at the time was opposed to Yushchenko, fearing his pro-western tendencies and ambitions for Ukraine to join NATO." Satsyuk was in hiding in Moscow, Russia, where the government has given him Russian citizenship, meaning he couldn't be extradited for trial to another country. When Yanukovich became president of Ukraine, Satsyuk was removed from the wanted list and returned to his home town Malyn in the summer of 2011.
