= Kaja Harter-Uibopuu =

Austrian legal historian (born 1968)

Kaja Harter-Uibopuu (born 6 March 1968 in Graz) is an Austrian ancient historian, legal historian and epigrapher.

== Life and career ==
Kaja Harter-Uibopuu, the daughter of the jurist Henn-Jüri Uibopuu and Ingeborg Peyrer, received the matura at Salzburg in 1986 and then studied ancient history and classics at the University of Graz. After receiving the Sponsion as a master of philosophy, she was a research assistant to Gerhard Thür at the institute for Roman law and ancient legal history at the University of Graz. She received a doctorate sub auspiciis Praesidentis there in 1997 with a thesis entitled "Interstate arbitration in the Achaean League: On peaceful conflict resolution according to epigraphic sources" (Das zwischenstaatliche Schiedsverfahren im achäischen Koinon. Zur friedlichen Streitbeilegung nach den epigraphischen Quellen). After that, she was employed in Vienna as an academic faculty member at the Commission for Ancient Legal History at the Austrian Academy of Sciences from 1998 to 1999 and from 2009 to 2015. From 1999 until 2003, she was a university assistant and lecturer at the University of Graz, then at the University of Vienna. She received her habilitation at Vienna in 2013. On 1 August 2015, she succeeded Helmut Halfmann as W2-Professor of ancient history at the University of Hamburg. In May 2016, she became a corresponding member of the German Archaeological Institute (DAI) and then an ordinary member in 2018. She has benn the subject representative of ancient history on the central directorate of the DAI from May 2017 and the directorate's deputy chairperson since May 2020. In 2021, Harter-Uibopuu was elected to the Academy of Sciences and Humanities in Hamburg. In 2023 she became the project leader for Inscriptiones Graecae.

Harter-Uibopuu's main academic focusses are legal history through epigraphy, especially inscriptions relating to legal processes of the Greek cities of Argos and Athens, ancient citizenship law, the constitutional and administrative law of Greek cities under Roman rule, and funerary law in Greco-Roman Asia Minor.

She has been married since 1996 and has two daughters.

== Selected bibliography ==
- Das zwischenstaatliche Schiedsverfahren im achäischen Koinon. Zur friedlichen Streitbeilegung nach den epigraphischen Quellen ("Interstate arbitration in the Achaean League: On peaceful conflict resolution according to epigraphic sources" = Akten der Gesellschaft für Griechische und Hellenistische Rechtsgeschichte. Vol. 12). Böhlau, Köln etc. 1998, ISBN 3-412-11798-6 (simultaneously PhD thesis, University of Graz, 1996).
- with Fritz Mitthof (ed.): Vergeben und Vergessen? Amnestie in der Antike. ("Forgive and Forget? Amnesty in Antiquity" = Wiener Kolloquien zur Antiken Rechtsgeschichte. Vol. 1). Holzhausen, Wien 2013, ISBN 978-3-902868-85-5 (Volltext).
- with Thomas Kruse (ed.): Sport und Recht in der Antike. ("Sport and Law in Antiquity" = Wiener Kolloquien zur Antiken Rechtsgeschichte. Band 2). Holzhausen, Wien 2014, ISBN 978-3-902976-14-7.
