= Deborah Valenze =

Deborah M. Valenze
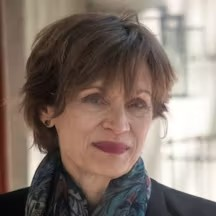
- in 2023
- Born: 1953 (age 72–73)
- Education: Radcliffe College
- Employer: Barnard College
- Known for: History professor and author

Deborah M. Valenze is an American historian and professor known for her work in British cultural and economic history. She is currently the Ann Whitney Olin Professor of History at Barnard College, Columbia University. Her research and teaching have covered the impact of political economy on social thought in the eighteenth and nineteenth centuries, the cultural history of economic life in Europe, the history of food and commodities, women’s work and industrialization, and the social history of religion.

== Early life and education ==
Valenze was born in Plattsburgh, New York, in 1953, where she attended public schools through high school. At the age of eight, she began studying the violin, the start of a life-long passion for music. She attended Radcliffe College, Harvard University, where she majored in European history.

She graduated Magna cum laude in 1975 and spent the next year on a Radcliffe scholarship as an independent researcher at the Institute of Historical Research in London.

She earned her doctorate at Brandeis University in 1982 and taught there, at Smith College, and at Worcester Polytechnic Institute before becoming an assistant professor at Barnard College.

== Academic career ==
Valenze joined the faculty at Barnard College, Columbia University, in New York in 1989. She received tenure in 1995 and became the Ann Whitney Olin Professor of History in 2015.

She was also a research associate at the Center for European Studies at Harvard University and acting director of the Women’s Studies in Religion Program at Harvard Divinity School during the 1997–1998 academic year. In 1998-99, she was a Fellow at the Mary Ingraham Bunting Institute of Radcliffe College.

Valenze was President of the North American Conference on British Studies from 2021 to 2023. She is a Fellow of the Royal Historical Society in Britain. She is currently a Board Member of the American Friends of the Institute of Historical Research, London.

Her scholarly work has been supported by the Guggenheim Foundation, the National Endowment for the Humanities, the American Council of Learned Societies, the Yale Center for British Art, the American Association of University Women, and the Fulbright-Hays Program.

Valenze frequently participates in public lectures and academic panels on the cultural and historical significance of early modern Britain, the history of agriculture and the environment, and changing ideas about food production. She is recognized by peers and reviewers for her interdisciplinary approach and her original contributions to the fields of political economy, food history, and gender studies.

Valenze was awarded a Guggenheim fellowship in 2011. Milk: A Local and Global History appeared that same year. A UK reviewer called the book a "fascinating history."
