= Malyn =

City in Zhytomyr Oblast, Ukraine

Malyn Малин, Malin
- City
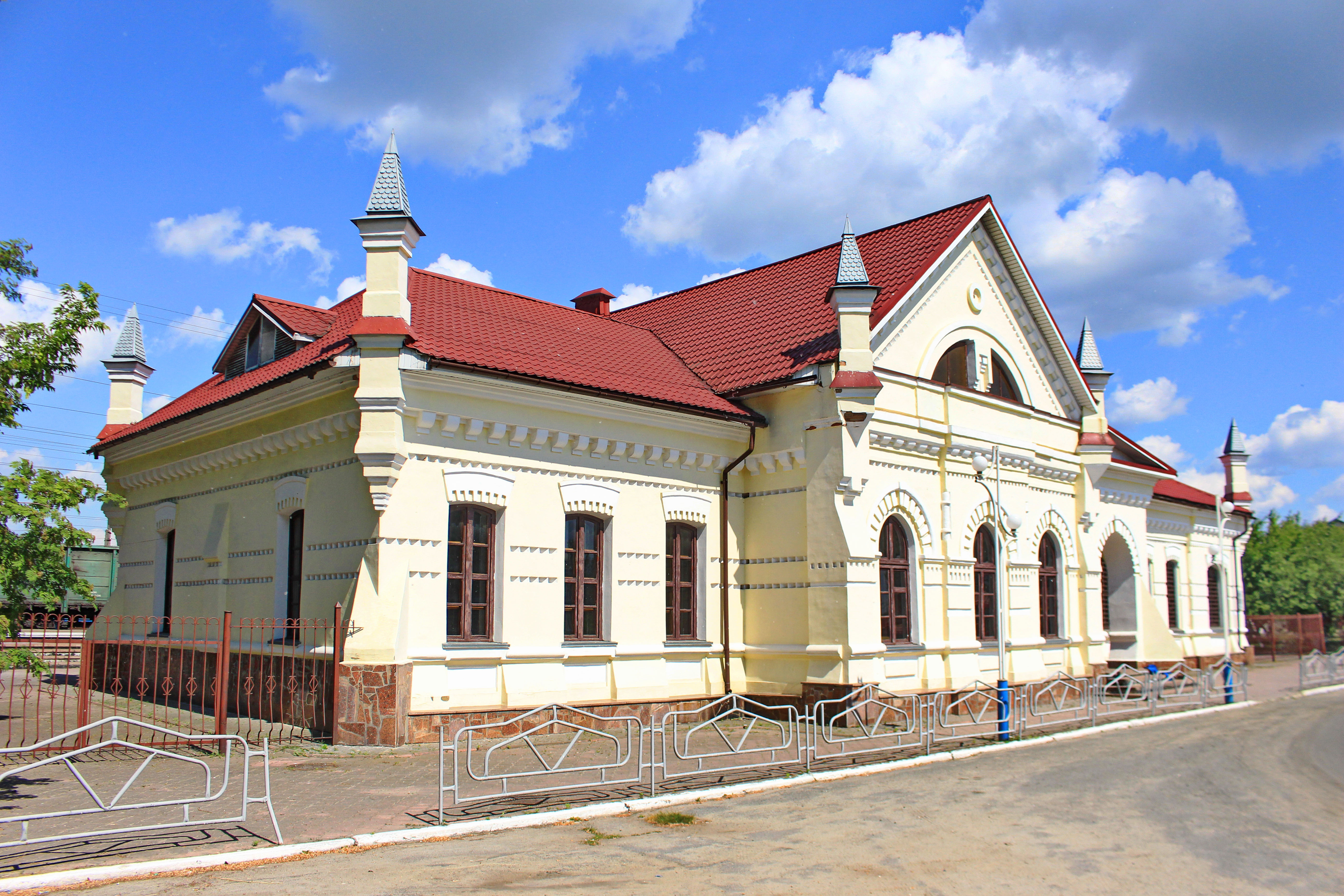
- Railway station

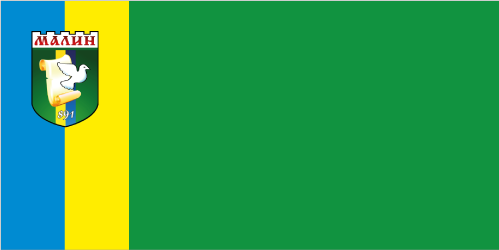
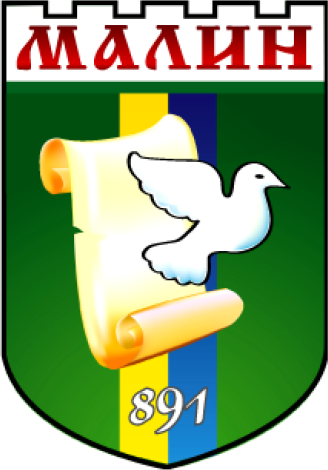
- Flag Coat of arms

- Location of Malyn Malyn (Ukraine)
- Coordinates: 50°46′8″N 29°16′12″E
- Country: Ukraine
- Oblast: Zhytomyr Oblast
- Raion: Korosten Raion
- Hromada: Malyn urban hromada
- Founded: 891

Area
  - Total: 60.92 km^{2} (23.52 sq mi)

Population (2022)
  - Total: 25,172
  - Density: 444.5/km^{2} (1,151/sq mi)
- Postal code: 11600
- Area code: +380-4133
- Website: Malyn governmental site

Malyn (Ukrainian: Малин, IPA: [ˈmɑlɪn], Polish: Malin) is a city in Zhytomyr Oblast (province) of Ukraine located about 100 kilometres (62 mi) northwest of Kyiv. It served as the administrative center of Malyn Raion until the administrative reform in 2020, when it was merged into Korosten Raion. Population: 25,172 (2022 estimate). As of January 2025, the city has a population of 27,000.

Located in a wooded area of Polesia (literally woodland), the city is known for its paper factory and a sheet of paper is depicted on the city's coat of arms. The city is located on the Irsha river which is a left tributary of Teteriv.

Through the city runs an important railroad Kyiv – Korosten and a motor vehicle highway Kyiv-Kovel-Warsaw.

The town hosts a seismic monitoring station (designated PS-45) belonging to an international network of nuclear test monitoring stations intended to verify the Comprehensive Test Ban Treaty (CTBT) treaty.

== History ==
The name of the city is traditionally connected with Prince Mal of the Drevlians mentioned in the Rus' chronicles, particularly during the Drevlian uprising of 945 against Igor, the Grand Prince of Kyiv.

Malyn was mentioned as a possession of nobleman Hryńko Wnuczkiewicz during the rule of Alexander Jagiellon at the turn of the 15th and 16th centuries. After his death, it passed to the Jelec family. Malin was administratively located in the Kijów Voivodeship in the Lesser Poland Province of the Kingdom of Poland. In the 18th century, it passed to noblewoman Anna Krasicka née Starzechowska, mother of leading Polish Enlightenment poet Ignacy Krasicki, and the Krasickis sold it to Stanisław Kordysz, who erected a new Catholic church in 1780. Following the Second Partition of Poland, the town was annexed by Russia in 1793. In 1801 it passed to the Morzkowski family, and afterwards to the Radziwiłł family.

Malyn is a small homeland of Nicholas Miklouho-Maclay, an Imperial Russian traveler, for whom Malyn served a residence to the maternal side of his family.

A paper mill and a tannery were founded in 1873 and 1877, respectively.

On 27–28 April 1920, it was the site of a battle in which the Poles defeated the Russians and liberated the town during the Kyiv offensive and Polish–Soviet War.

In 1939, 3,607 Jews (32% of the population) lived in Malin.

During World War II, Malyn was under German occupation from 29 July 1941 until 12 November 1943. It was administered as a part of the Reichskommissariat Ukraine.

Most of Malyn’s Jewish residents were shot by Nazi mobile killing units and their collaborators in August and September 1941. According to Soviet-era documentation, between 670 and over 1,100 Jews from Malyn and nearby areas were murdered and buried in mass graves located in the Shcherbov Yar ravine.

On March 3, 1975, the village of Horodyshche of the Ukrainian Village Council and the southwestern part of the village of Malynivka of the Malynivka Village Council of the Malyn district were included in the city of Malyn.

At least five people were killed in Malyn in the 2022 Russian invasion of Ukraine. On February 27, 2022, a Bayraktar drone downed a Russian Buk near Malyn. On March 7, 2022, Russians shelled the town, destroying a two-story building and 3 cars. It is known that one person was killed and 3 others were injured. The Church of St. Michael of the Odesa Diocese of the UOC (MP), located in the city center at 3 Soborna Square, was also destroyed. On May 20, 2022, according to the mayor of Malyn, Oleksandr Sytailo, 3 people were injured and 100 houses were damaged by rocket fire in the town.

== Demographics ==
Distribution of the population by ethnicity according to the 2001 census:

Ethnic groups in Malyn
	percent
Ukrainians	93.23%
Russians	4.12%
Poles	1.10%
Czechs	0.60%
Belarusians	0.32%
Jews	0.14%
Germans	0.06%
Armenians	0.05%
Moldovans	0.05%

== Sports ==
FC Papirnyk Malyn is a Ukrainian football team based in Malyn.

== Gallery ==
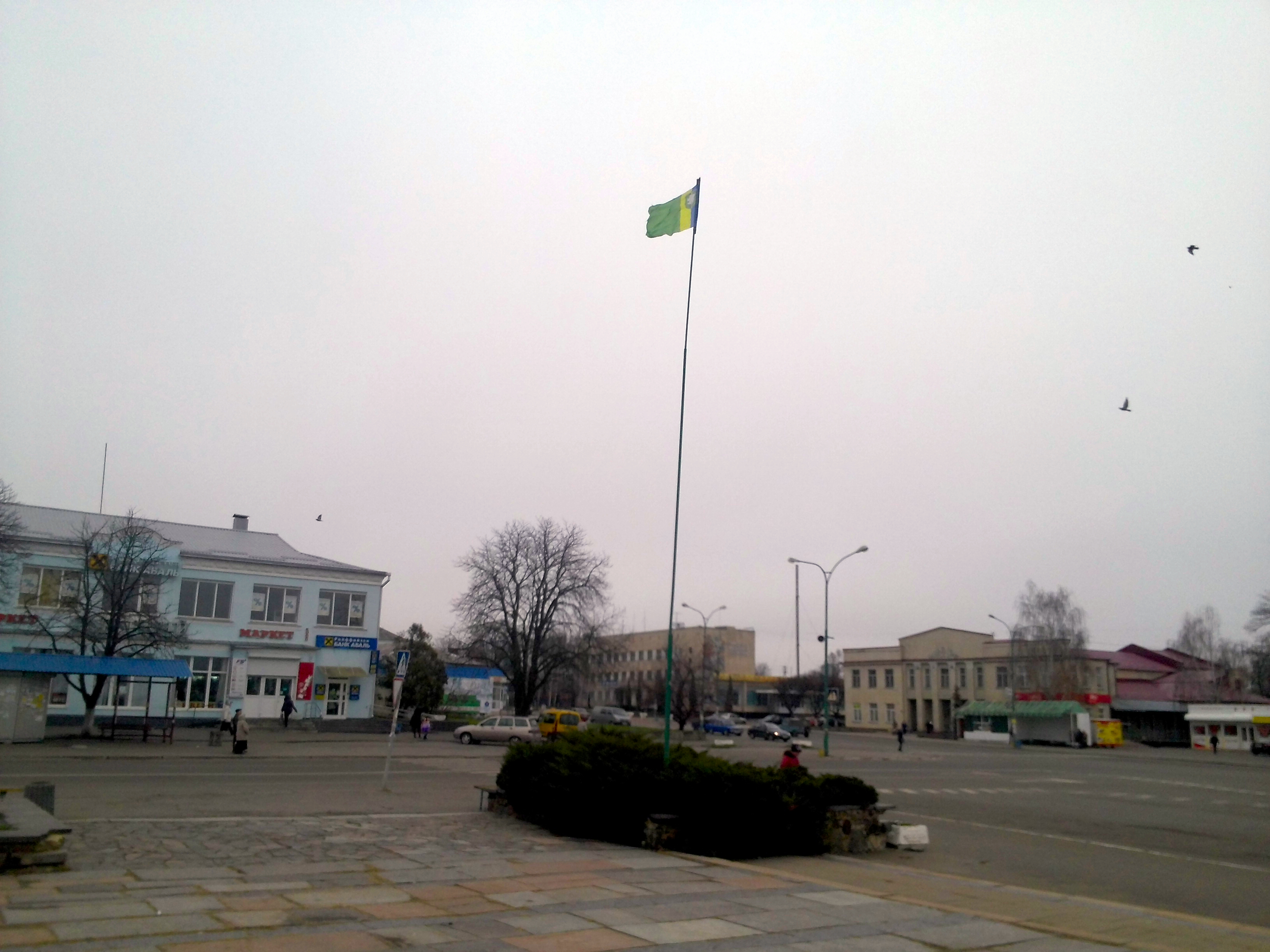
Central square

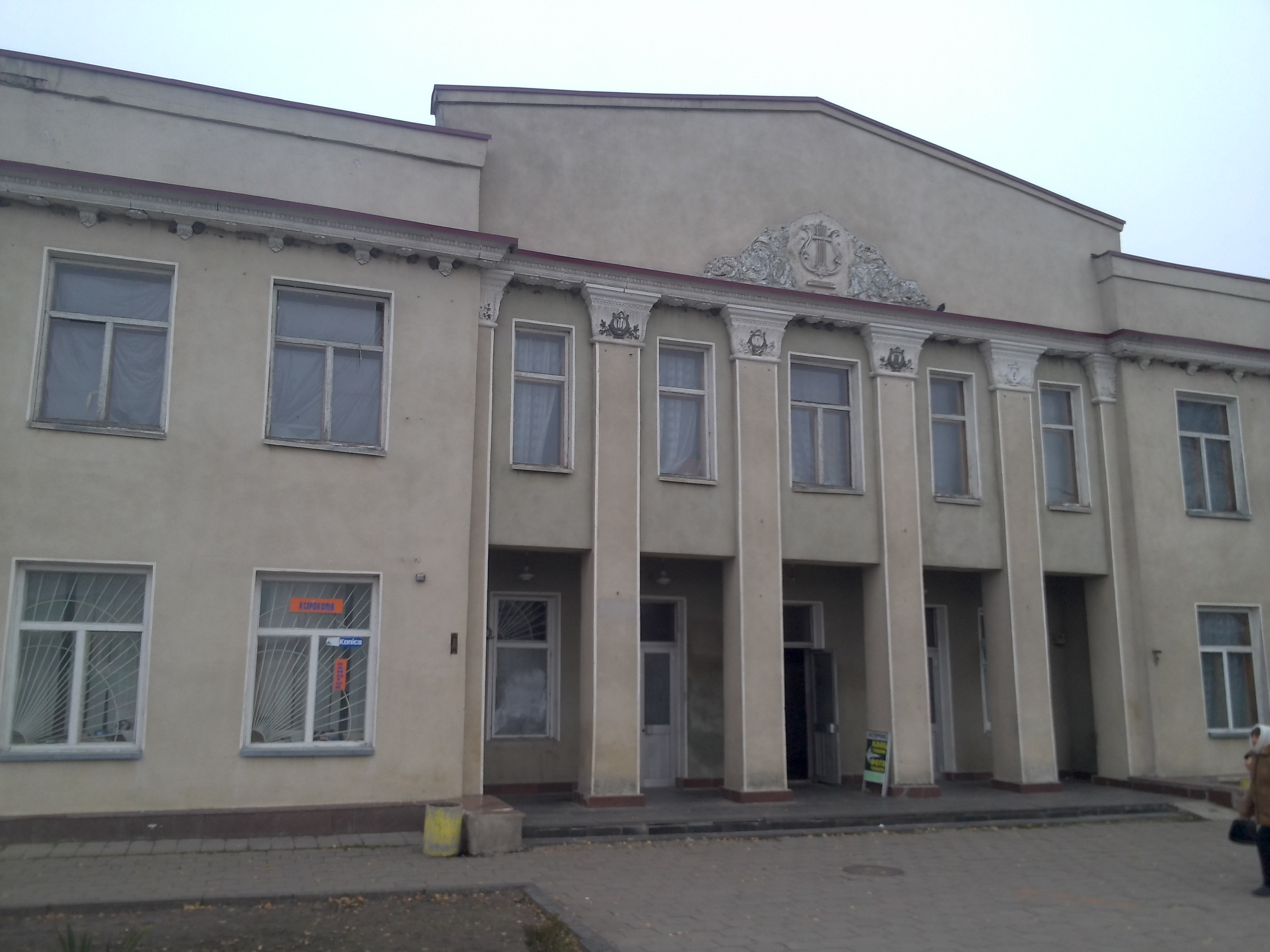
House of culture

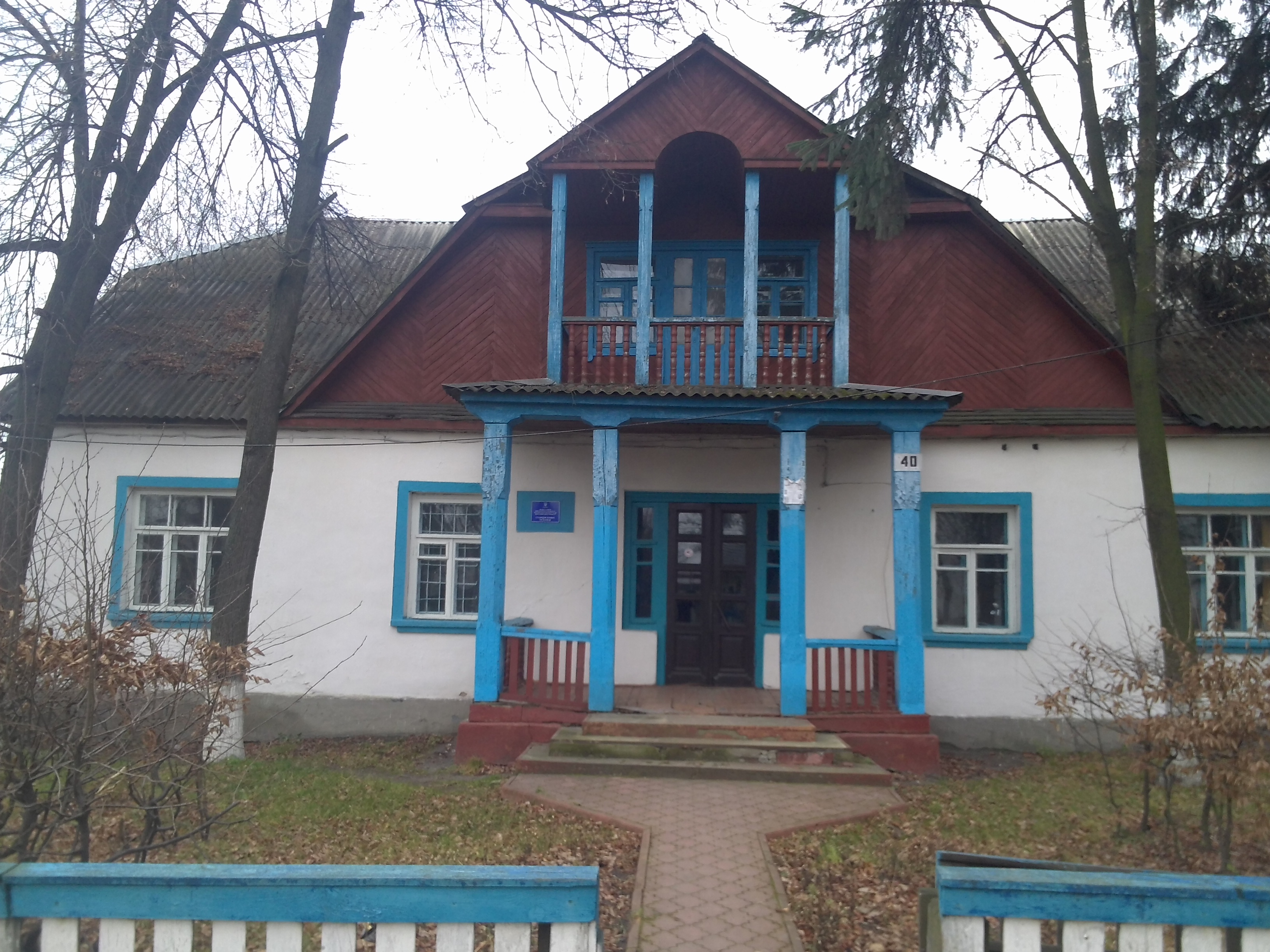
Historic building

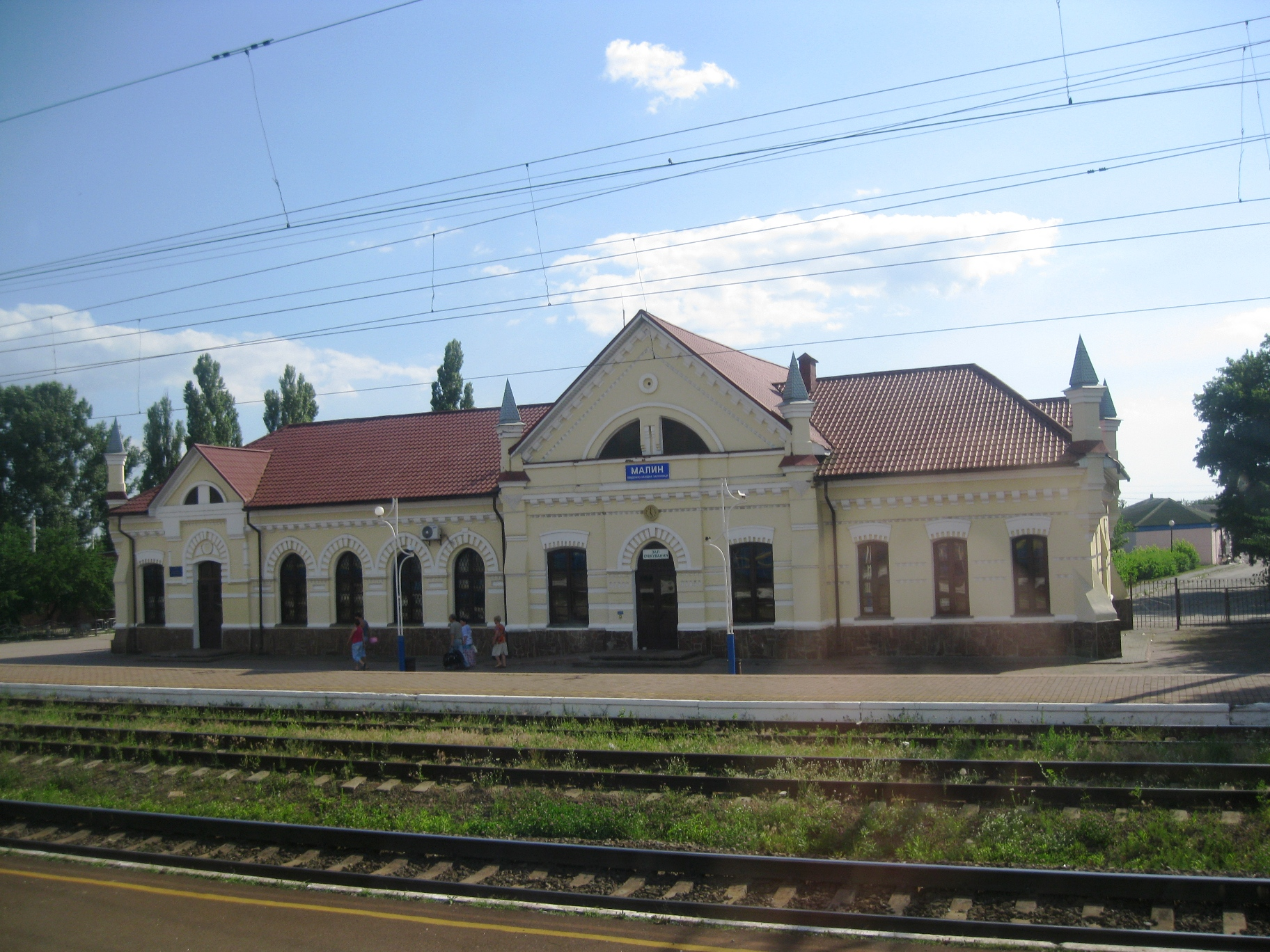
Malyn railway station

== Notable people ==
- Vladyslav Gorai, Ukrainian opera singer (tenor)
- Batia Lishansky, Israeli sculptor
- Rayisa Nedashkivska, Soviet-Ukrainian theater and cinema actress
- David Nowakowsky, composer
- Rachel Yanait Ben-Zvi, Israeli author and educator
- Dmytro Kozatskyi, Ukrainian photographer, serviceman, senior soldier
- Volodymir Satsyuk, former deputy head of Ukraine’s intelligence agency, a suspect in president Yushchenko's poisoning.
