= Peter J. A. Lucas =

British Military Cross recipient

Lieutenant-Colonel Peter Joshua Arnold Lucas MC (8 July 1914 – 30 June 1994) was a British military veteran awarded the Military Cross (MC) for his actions during World War II.

== Early life ==
A Leicestershire farmer's son, Peter Joshua Arnold Lucas was born on 9 July 1914 at Eastwell Hall, near Melton Mowbray and educated at Warwick School. He served in the Coldstream Guards from 1936 to 1938, before leaving to join the Warwickshire Police. Released for military service, in 1939 he was selected for training at the Royal Military College, Sandhurst and then was commissioned into the Royal Warwickshire Regiment as a second lieutenant on 4 June 1940. His service number was 138730.

== Military career ==
In 1942 he was seconded to the 8th Battalion, the Durham Light Infantry (DLI). By March 1943 Erwin Rommel was trapped in Tunisia between the British Eighth Army in the east and the 1st Army in the west. After routing the Americans at the Kasserine Pass he dug his army in at the old French frontier position on the Mareth Line and, a sick man, departed for Europe, leaving Hans-Jürgen von Arnim in charge. Montgomery, commander of the Eighth Army, began his attack through its northern end, via the formidable Wadi Zigzaou.

Lucas was serving in D Company, 8th Battalion, Durham Light Infantry, part of 151 Brigade, which established a bridgehead on the far side of the Wadi. In order to widen the bridgehead the Royal Engineers had built a causeway across the Wadi under intense fire, only to see it wrecked by a cloudburst. Meanwhile 75 German tanks, infantry of 15 Panzer Division, a regiment from 90th Light Division and Ramcke parachutists were forming up at Zarat, to attack the brigade. The 8th DLI confronted the German assault with no supporting weapons – the few Valentine tanks and anti-tank guns were unable to cross the wadi - and no air support, since the aircraft had been grounded by torrential rain. The German attack began with accurate shelling of the Durhams' position, which caused many casualties. When the gunfire was at its heaviest Lucas, commanding the Bren Gun Carrier Platoon, answered an urgent call from A and B Companies for wireless sets and batteries. Undeterred by the murderous defensive fire sweeping the wadi Lucas went forward in his carrier through a gap in the minefield. He safely crossed the wadi and anti-tank ditch, all the time under heavy fire, and finally reached the forward companies with his valuable cargo. He then returned to Battalion H.Q. the way he had come. Later, under equally difficult conditions, he again undertook the hazardous journey this time with rations and ammunition. There is no doubt that his actions enabled the forward troops to hold onto their positions and Captain Lucas was awarded the Military Cross. Lucas remained with the 8th DLI during the rest of the North African campaign.

In July 1943 the 8th DLI was part of the invasion force for Operation Husky, the allied campaign to capture Sicily from the Italian and German armies. Alerted to the invasion, the Germans airlifted paratroopers to Catania, north of the 8th Army's landing sites around Syracuse. One of the major links into mainland Sicily was the Primosole Bridge over the River Simeto between Syracuse and Catania. British Paratroopers were sent to capture the bridge (Operation Fustian), but, although the British 1st Parachute Brigade managed to take the bridge, they were forced to retreat due to an overwhelming enemy presence. The Durham Light Infantry and the 44th Royal Tank Regiment raced north to reinforce the paratroops. After wading the Simeto north of the bridge two companies of the 8th DLI succeeded in establishing a bridgehead on the opposite bank, taking the Primosole Bridge over which the remaining two companies of the Battalion were able to pass to reinforce the leading companies. Despite heavy casualties in hand to hand fighting the 8th DLI held the bridgehead until they were reinforced during the night by the 9th and 6th DLI. In the course of the battle Lucas' position in the east of the bridgehead was struck by a German shell; he was seriously wounded in the back and hand and evacuated to Malta.

Lucas fought to regain his fitness and rejoined the Royal Warwickshire Regiment after the war. In 1947/48 he served in Palestine in anti-terrorist operations and was mentioned in despatches for gallant and distinguished services during the period 27 September 1947 – 26 March 1948. Afterwards he was seconded to the King's African Rifles (KAR) and fought against the Mau-Mau in Kenya and against communist terrorists in Malaya. His final appointments were as commandant of the Army School of Physical Training at Aldershot and then as administrative commandant of the Defence NBC School at Winterbourne Gunner, Wiltshire.

== Personal life ==
As a young man he played rugby; he was also a good horseman and shot and took a keen interest in the theatre. In retirement he worked at the School of Infantry, Warminster and was also a councillor on Amesbury Rural District Council.

He married, in 1942, Amy Packer, who died in 1985; He is survived by a daughter and two grandchildren.
