= Malyn Raion =

Former subdivision of Zhytomyr Oblast, Ukraine

Malyn Raion Малинський район
- Raion
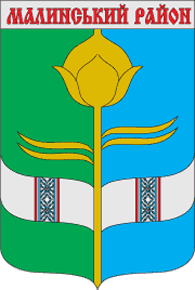
- Coat of arms

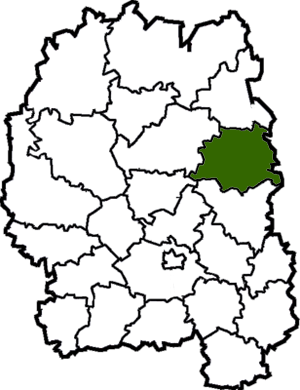
- Coordinates: 50°49′41″N 29°2′12″E
- Country: Ukraine
- Oblast: Zhytomyr Oblast
- Disestablished: 18 July 2020
- Admin. center: Malyn
- Subdivisions: List: 0 — city councils; 2 — settlement councils; — rural councils; Number of localities: 0 — cities; 2 — urban-type settlements; — villages; — rural settlements

Area
  - Total: 1,406 km^{2} (543 sq mi)

Population (2020)
  - Total: 18,010 ▼
  - Density: 12.81/km^{2} (33.18/sq mi)
- Time zone: UTC+02:00 (EET)
  - Summer (DST): UTC+03:00 (EEST)
- Area code: +380

Malyn Raion (Ukrainian: Малинський район) was a raion (district) of Zhytomyr Oblast, northern Ukraine. Its administrative centre was located at Malyn, which did not belong to the raion and was incorporated separately as a city of oblast significance. The raion covered an area of 1,406 square kilometres (543 mi^{2}). The raion was abolished on 18 July 2020 as part of the administrative reform of Ukraine, which reduced the number of raions of Zhytomyr Oblast to four. The area of Malyn Raion was merged into Korosten Raion. The last estimate of the raion population was 18,010 (2020 est.)

== Geography ==
It was situated in the north-eastern part of the Oblast. Distance Malyn to the Oblast center is a 102 km by highways.

== Social and historic tourist objects ==
There is the row of sights of architecture and town-planning: Mykolaivska church in v. Vorsivka (in 1850), St. Mykhailyvska church in v Ukrainka (end of a ХІХc.); railway station in v. Chopovychi (the end of the ХІХc.).
