= John Ensminger =

John Ensminger may refer to:

- John Ensminger, American drummer for Dog Fashion Disco and Polkadot Cadaver
- John C. Ensminger (1934–2022), American businessman and Louisiana State Senator
