= Centro Cultural Ricardo Rojas =

Cultural center in Buenos Aires, Argentina

Rojas Cultural Center
- Centro Cultural Rojas
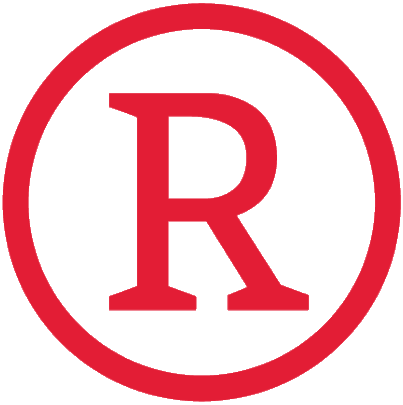

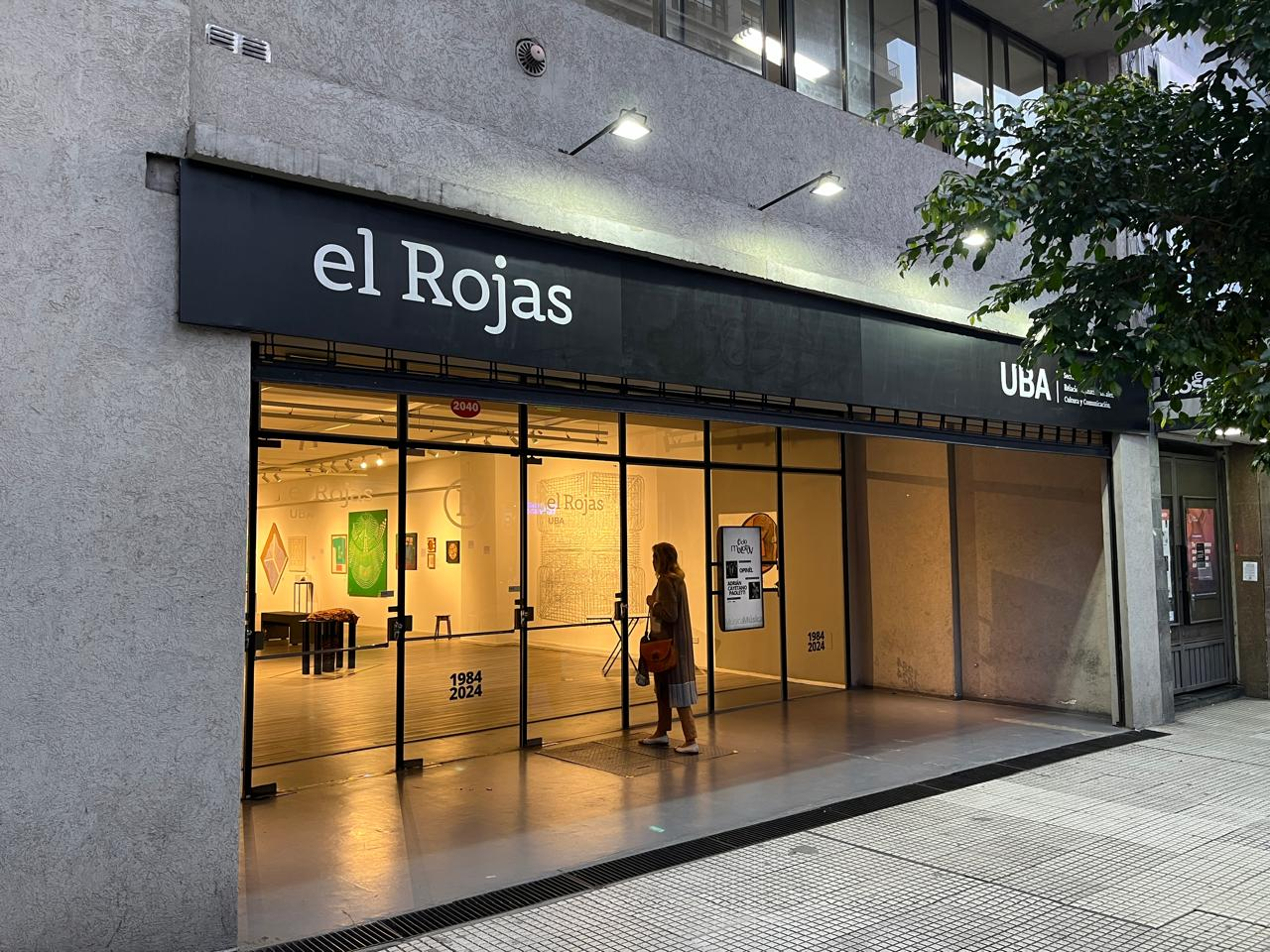
- CCRRRojas UBA 2026

- Location within Buenos Aires
- Former names: Centro Cultural Ricardo Rojas
- Alternative names: El Rojas

General information
- Type: Cultural center
- Location: Avenida Corrientes 2038, Buenos Aires, Argentina
- Coordinates: 34°36′17″S 58°23′46″W
- Opened: 1984; 42 years ago
- Owner: University of Buenos Aires

Website
- rojas.uba.ar

The Centro Cultural Ricardo Rojas ("Ricardo Rojas Cultural Center") is a cultural center in Buenos Aires, Argentina. It is owned and operated by the University of Buenos Aires (UBA), the country's largest university. It is named after journalist and writer Ricardo Rojas (1882–1957), who served as the university's rector from 1926 to 1930.

The cultural center organizes conferences, expositions, workshops, courses and contests both on a national and international scale. It also has a digital repository of books, texts, magazines and catalogues available for free, covering a wide array of topics. According to the UBA Secretariat of Institutional Relations, Culture and Communication, which operates the center, up to 900 workshops and courses are taught at the CCRR every semester, attracting over 100 thousand visitors each year.

The CCRR was founded in 1984, in the aftermath of the last military dictatorship and in a context of social awakening. The building itself previously housed the Faculty of Medical Sciences students' union. The center quickly became an important meeting place and groundwork for visual artists upon the opening of the Galería del Rojas.

It is the cultural center that the University of Buenos Aires (UBA) proposes to artists, the public, and its students, aiming to transcend the boundaries of each discipline and create a space for encounter. It is a multifaceted organization, capable of generating networks in which knowledge, creation, social interaction, and reflection take place.

The center is part of the university's Secretariat of Institutional Relations, Culture, and Communication. Located in Balvanera, and like the neighborhood itself, it is open to cross-pollination, mixing, and experimentation. It serves as a bridge to the community, and it is not necessary to be a student, faculty member, or staff member of the UBA to participate in its activities.
