= Jeffrey Heath =

Jeffrey Heath may refer to:

- Jeffrey Heath (linguist)
- Jeffrey Heath (disability advocate)
