= Monika Trümper =

German archaeologist

- Occupation: Archaeologist
- Awards: Guggenheim Fellowship (2011)

Academic background
- Education: Hochschule für Musik und Tanz Köln; LMU Munich; Heidelberg University
- Doctoral advisor: Paul Zanker

Academic work
- Discipline: Classical archaoelogy
- Sub-discipline: Delos
- Institutions: Heidelberg University; University of North Carolina at Chapel Hill; Free University of Berlin

Monika Trümper is a German archaeologist. A 2011 Guggenheim Fellow, she has written several books in classical archaeology, including two on the Greek island of Delos. She has also worked as a full professor at the University of North Carolina at Chapel Hill and the Free University of Berlin.

== Biography ==
Trümper initially studied music, obtaining a master's degree in violin at the Hochschule für Musik und Tanz Köln by 1989. She attended LMU Munich, where she got an MA in 1993 and PhD in 1995 (both in classical archaeology), and Heidelberg University, where she obtained a habilitation in 2005. Her three graduate theses were centered on the Greek island of Delos, with the first two supervised by Paul Zanker. She also studied at University of Cologne and Paris-Sorbonne University.

Trümper worked as an assistant professor at the Heidelberg University Department of Classics (1993–2003). After holding visiting positions at the Center for Hellenic Studies (2003–2004) and Johns Hopkins University (2004–2005), she worked as an assistant professor of classical archaeology at University of North Carolina at Chapel Hill Department of Classics starting in 2005. She was promoted to associate professor in 2008 and full professor in 2013. She also became a full professor of classical archaeology at the Free University of Berlin Institute of Classical Archaeology in 2013.

Trümper's research centers on Greek and Roman archaeology, architecture, and urbanism. She was author of Kaffee und Kaufleute: Guatemala und der Hamburger Handel (1871–1914), the seventh volume of Historia latinoamericana en la Universidad de Hamburgo published in 1996. She wrote two archaeology books on Delos: Wohnen in Delos (2001), which examines "the symbolic use of the houses at Delos to convey messages about the status of their occupants", and Die "Agora des Italiens" in Delos (2008), which is based on her 2004 habilitation thesis and argues that the Agora of the Italians was a garden. In 2009, she published Graeco-Roman Slave Markets: Fact or Fiction? after working on it as a 2008–2009 National Humanities Center Fellow. She was also a contributor to Tonio Hölscher's 2002 book Klassische Archäologie: Grundwissen. In 2011, she was awarded a Guggenheim Fellowship in Classics.

Her fieldwork centers on Delos, though she often has experience in excavations in France, Germany, and Italy.

== Bibliography ==
- Kaffee und Kaufleute: Guatemala und der Hamburger Handel (1871–1914) (1996)
- Wohnen in Delos: Eine baugeschichtliche Untersuchung zum Wandel der Wohnkultur in hellenistischer Zeit (1998)
- Die "Agora des Italiens" in Delos (2008) (Note: Reviews of this book:)
- Graeco-Roman Slave Markets: Fact or Fiction? (2009) (Note: Reviews of this book:)
