= Jean Ensminger =

Jean Ensminger is an American social scientist. She is the Edie and Lew Wasserman Professor of Social Science at Caltech. Her scholarship focuses on the political economy of Africa, global distribution of wealth, corruption in development and decentralized government. Along with Robert Boyd and Joseph Henrich, she did some of the first lab-in-the-field experiments on prosociality, in the 1990s.

== Early life and education ==
Ensminger trained with paleontologist Louis Leakey in the Olduvai Gorge in Kenya. Her doctoral research focused on the Orma of Kenya. She obtained her Ph.D. from Northwestern University in 1984.

== Career ==
Ensminger's fieldwork used methods from game theory to study whether human behavior is naturally cooperative or competitive, and to explain how nations became rich or poor. She applied New Institutional Economics to study property rights and transaction costs. Ensminger described how economic incentives influenced social behaviors including religious choices. Prior to arriving at Caltech, Ensminger taught at Washington University in St. Louis as part of a group assembled by Douglass North, the 1993 Nobel laureate in Economics. Her research built on North's work comparing the relative impacts of preferences and costs on institutional change.

While working on development projects in Kenya, Ensminger became interested in the scope of corruption of World Bank initiatives in the area, and designed methods to quantitate its magnitude.

Ensminger was the first woman head of a division - Humanities and Social Sciences- at Caltech, from 2002 to 2006. As a visiting scholar at the Russell Sage Foundation in 2006–2007, she compared and contrasted altruism between nomadic Kenyans and urban Americans, and investigated how social networks, information, trust, and economic power impact behaviors.

Ensminger served as President of the Society for Economic Anthropology.

With Joseph Henrich, Ensminger was co–principal investigator of the Roots of Human Sociality Project, which used dictator games and other research tools to study the role of prosociality in bringing change to market institutions.

Ensminger has been asked if her findings, from studying some of the world's poorest people living in subsistence economies, are relevant to industrial societies. She commented, "People are more alike everywhere than most people think."

== Awards ==
John Simon Guggenheim Fellowship, 2011

== Books ==
- Making a Market: The Institutional Transformation of an African Society, Cambridge University Press, 1996
- Experimenting with Social Norms: Fairness and Punishment in Cross-Cultural Perspective, Russell Sage Foundation, 2014
- Theory in Economic Anthropology (ed.), AltaMira Press, 2001

== Selected articles and chapters ==
- Detecting Corruption: Evidence from a World Bank project in Kenya (World Development, 2025)
- Detecting Fraud in Development Aid (NBER Working Paper, 2022)
- Written Testimony before the House Financial Services Committee, Subcommittee on International Monetary Policy and Trade on "Examining Results and Accountability at the World Bank." (2019)
- Corruption in Community Driven Development: A Kenyan Case Study with Insights from Indonesia (U4, 2017)
- Culture does account for variation in game behavior. (Proceedings of the National Academy of Sciences of the United States of America, 2012)
- Markets, Religion, Community Size, and the Evolution of Fairness and Punishment. (Science, 2010)
- Costly punishment across human societies. (Science, 2006)
- "Economic man" in cross-cultural perspective: behavioral experiments in 15 small-scale societies. (Behavioral and Brain Sciences, 2005)
- 12 Market Integration and Fairness: Evidence from Ultimatum, Dictator, and Public Goods Experiments in East Africa (in Foundations of Human Sociality, 2004)
