= Eliezer Margolin =

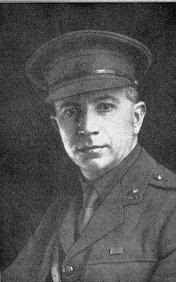
- Margolin in c. 1916
- Born: 5 February 1875; Belgorod, Kursk Governorate, Russia
- Died: 2 June 1944 (aged 69); Sydney, New South Wales, Australia
- Military career
- Allegiance: Australia
- Branch: Citizen Military Forces; Australian Imperial Force; British Army
- Service years: 1911–1921
- Rank: Lieutenant colonel
- Commands: 40th Battalion, Royal Fusiliers; 39th Battalion, Royal Fusiliers
- Conflicts: First World War; Gallipoli campaign; Western Front; Sinai and Palestine campaign; Capture of Es Salt
- Awards: Distinguished Service Order; Mentioned in Despatches

Eliezer Margolin, DSO (Hebrew: אליעזר מרגולין; 5 February 1875 – 2 June 1944) was a Russian-born Australian Jew who served as a commander of the Jewish Legion during the First World War.

== Early life ==
Margolin was born on 5 February 1875 in Belgorod, Kursk Governorate, Russian Empire, the son of Murdochy Joseph Margolin and Llata Carlin.

In 1892, Margolin immigrated to Ottoman Palestine with his family and settled in Rehovot. He became involved in agricultural labor and defense. Due to the death of his parents and the poor economic conditions in the region, he immigrated to Australia in 1902. He then spent the next two years living in Perth, Coolgardie, Kalgoorlie, and Lawlers. He was living in the latter town when he became a naturalized Australian citizen in 1904, by which point he was working as a green grocer. He spent three years working as manager of Silbert and Sharp's Menzies branch and was treasurer of the Menzies Rifle Club. In 1907, he moved to Leonora to manage the Silbert and Sharp branch there. He later moved to Collie, Western Australia and ran a cordial factory.

== Military service ==
In 1911, Margolin was made second lieutenant of the Collie Half-Company of the First West Australian Infantry Regiment. In August 1914, shortly after the outbreak of the First World War, he was lieutenant and commanding officer of the Collie division of the "A" Company, 86th Regiment when the division was mobilized. In December 1914, he became captain of the 88th Infantry of the Australian Imperial Forces. In April 1915, he was one of the first in his battalion to land in Gallipoli during the Gallipoli campaign. While fighting there, his senior officer was killed and he took charge of his men until he was shot through the arm. In September 1915, he was promoted to major and became second in command of the 16th Battalion. He was part of the last detachment to leave Gallipoli. In June 1916, in honor of the 1916 Birthday Honours, he received the Distinguished Service Order. He served on the Western Front in France from 1916 to 1917 and was wounded several times there. From June to September 1917, he was temporarily made lieutenant-colonel in command of the 14th Battalion, after which he returned to the 16th. In September 1917, he was mentioned in dispatches. He was with the 16th until he was evacuated to a London hospital with a knee injury.

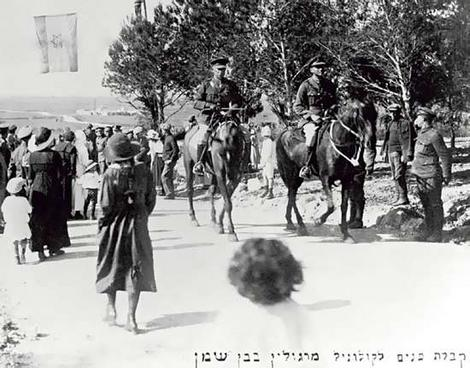
Margolin entering Ben Shemen with soldiers of the 39th Battalion of the King's Slingshots

In March 1918, Margolin assumed command of the 39th Battalion, Royal Fusiliers. He met Ze'ev Jabotinsky and volunteers from the Zion Mule Corps while serving in Gallipoli, and Jabotinsky offered him command of the battalion, which was part of the Jewish Legion. The battalion mostly consisted of Jewish volunteers from America and Canada and included David Ben-Gurion and Yitzhak Ben-Zvi. In the summer of 1918, he went to Palestine as the battalion's commander. The battalion broke through the Turkish front on the Jordan River and participated in the Capture of Es Salt. He was then made military governor of Es Salt. He also disregarded military norms by cultivating friendly relations with Palestinian volunteers in the third battalion of the Jewish Legion. By August 1918, he was officially promoted to colonel.

After the Armistice and the end of the First World War, most of the Jewish Legion volunteers returned home. Margolin remained in Palestine. In December 1919, he became commander of the newly organized First Judaeans, which consisted of former members of the Jewish Legion. He struggled with hostility the British military had with the First Judaeans and maintained a deep relationship with the Yishuv. In the 1920 Nebi Musa riots, his men were dispersed throughout the Arab villages, with his knowledge, in an attempt to prevent further bloodshed. In March 1921, the British military replaced the First Judaeans with the Palestine Defense Force, which consisted of a Jewish unit and an Arab unit. Margolin commanded the Jewish unit. In May 1921, during the Jaffa riots, Jewish soldiers and former soldiers took arms from Sarafand military camp without Margolin's knowledge and used them to stop the riots. A day later, he arrived in Tel Aviv, mobilized soldiers and former soldiers, and provided them with military arms. This was used as a pretext to dismantle the Palestine Defense Force and what was left of the Jewish Legion. Margolin resigned to escape court marshal and returned to Australia.

== Later life ==
When Margolin returned to Australia in 1921, he bought and ran a service station in Nedlands, Perth. He then became vice-president of the local Returned Sailors' and Soldiers' Imperial League of Australia, a foundation member of the Perth Legacy Club, and president of the Naval and Military Club and the 16th Battalion Association. In 1926, he married Hilda Myrtle England. They had no children.

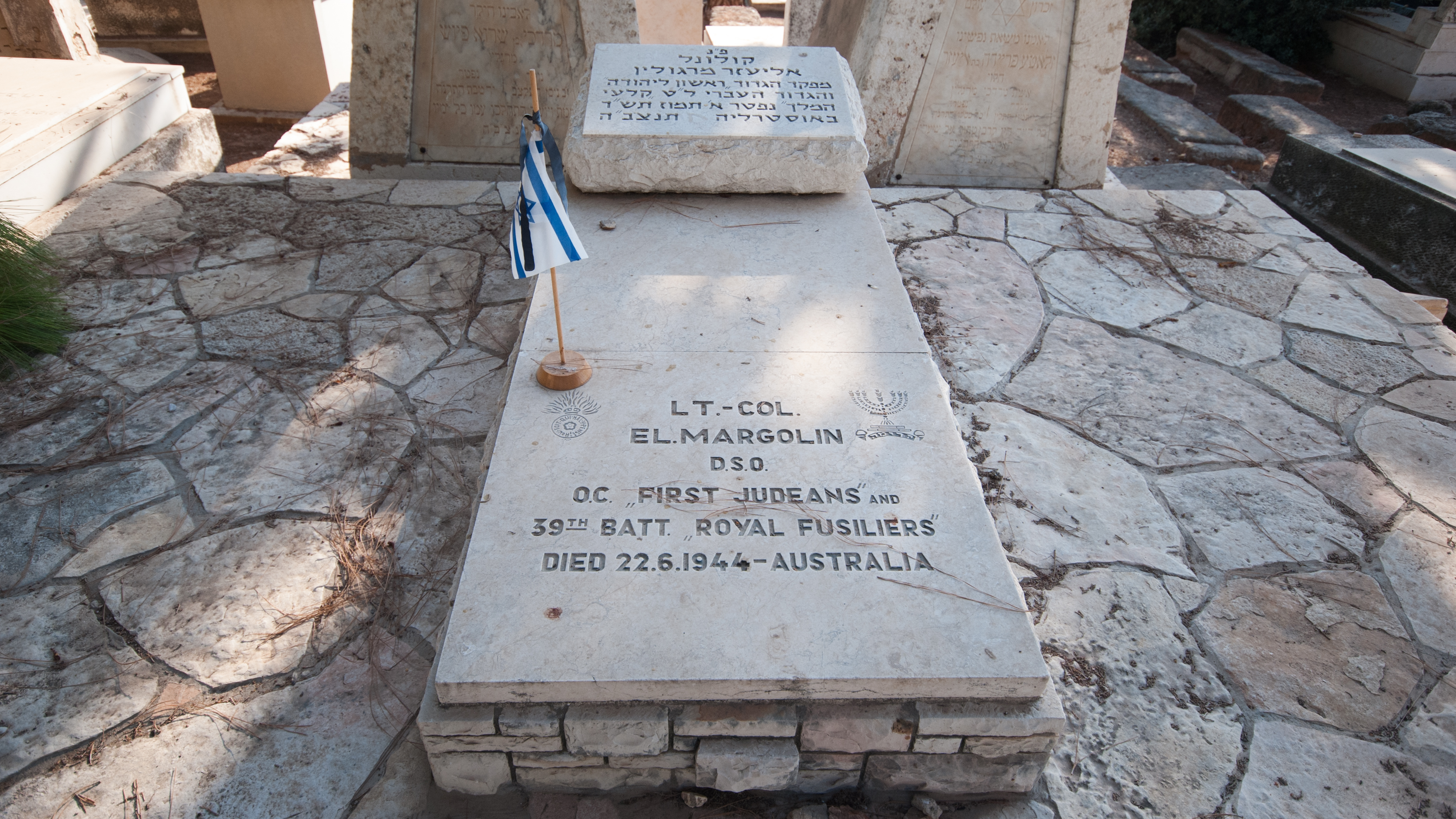
Margolin's grave in the Rehovot cemetery

Margolin died from a cerebral haemorrhage at a private hospital on 2 June 1944. His funeral was held in Karrakatta and was attended by, among other people, Brigadier Hoad of the G.O.C. and the state executives and members of the RSL. The ceremony was conducted at the crematorium by acting state RSL president E. S. Watt. He was cremated. In 1950, his remains were sent to Israel and buried in a grave near his parents in Rehovot. The burial was attended by, among other people, Prime Minister David Ben-Gurion, Australian Minister to Israel Osmond Charles Fuhrman, Minister of Supply and Rationing Dov Yosef, Knesset member Yitzhak Ben-Zvi, Aloof Moshe Dayan, former Haganah commander Yaacov Pat, and veterans of the Jewish Legion. Author Moshe Smilansky delivered the eulogy. His widow donated his ceremonial sword and medals to Chief of the General Staff Yigael Yadin, who accepted it on behalf of Israel and the army. Yadin turned them over to the Menorah Club, which was founded by veterans of the Fist World War, in a ceremony attended by veterans of the Zion Mule Corps and the Jewish Legion.
