= Moshe Smilansky =

Israeli writer (1874–1953)

- משה סמילנסקי
- Moshe Smilansky
- Born: February 24, 1874; Telepino, Kiev Governorate, Russian Empire (present-day Ukraine)
- Died: October 6, 1953 (aged 79); Tel Aviv, Israel
- Occupations: Farmer, author, Zionist activist
- Known for: Advocating peaceful coexistence with Arabs in Mandatory Palestine, literary works
- Awards: MBE

Moshe Smilansky MBE (Hebrew: משה סמילנסקי; February 24, 1874 – October 6, 1953) was a pioneer of the First Aliyah, a Zionist leader who advocated peaceful coexistence with the Arabs in Mandatory Palestine, a farmer, and a prolific author of fiction and non-fiction literary works.

== Early life ==
Moshe Smilansky was born in 1874 to a family of farmers in Telepino, a village in Kiev Governorate, then part of the Russian Empire (present-day Ukraine). He grew up in a pastoral environment and received his education from private tutors, also being influenced by the members of Bilu, the first Zionist group of agricultural pioneers to set out for Eretz Israel, who lived in Telepino for a while; and by disciples of Leo Tolstoy who had settled in the village.

Smilansky travelled to Ottoman Palestine in 1890, at the age of 16. He planned to study at Mikve Israel agricultural school, but then purchased with his family's assistance and in Hadera in 1891. After his family's return to Russia he became an agricultural worker in Rishon LeZion before settling in Rehovot in 1893. At the age of 20 he went back to Russia to serve in the military, but returned to Palestine after several weeks. Smilansky settled in Rehovot as an agricultural pioneer, working at his vineyards, almond and citrus groves as a farmer/landowner.

== Later life and career ==
=== Literature ===
Smilansky, who considered himself a disciple of Ahad Ha'am, was an active Zionist whose cultural output include many essays and articles, which he has contributed to Hebrew periodicals published in Russia and in Germany (Ha-Tsefirah, Ha-Meliẓ, Ha-Tzofeh, Lu'aḥ Aḥiasaf, Ha-Shilo'aḥ, and Ha-Olam), sometimes under the pen name "Ben Hava". His articles dealt with the Yishuv, the Jewish community in Eretz Israel ("Land of Israel"). Smilansky also published in Hebrew periodicals in Ereẓ Israel, where he was one of the first contributors (writing under the pen name "Heruti") to the journal of Ha-Po'el ha-Tsa'ir and a co-founder of Ha-Omer literary journal together with David Yellin and S. Ben Zion (Simha Alter Guttman). His first article appeared already in 1889.

After falling ill and travelling to Europe in search of a cure in 1906, Smilansky used his convalescence period to write his first story. It dealt with Arab life and folklore, and with relations between Jews and Arabs. It became the first of a whole series on the topic, which Smilansky published under the Muslim pseudonym Khawaja Moussa, "Master Moshe".

Smilansky's literary works include autobiographical novels as well as memoirs and non-fiction depictions of the Zionist pioneers of the First Aliyah and Second Aliyah that were collected in the four-volume Mishpahat ha-Adamah and the six-volume Perakim be-Toledot ha-Yishuv. His groundbreaking fiction stories and sketches depicting Arab life in Ottoman Palestine were first published in 1906 under the pseudonym Hawaja Mussa (Hebrew: חוג'ה מוסה), and collected in the volume Bene Arav (also spelled Bnei Arav), first published in Odessa in 1911. Smilansky was awarded the Ussishkin Memorial Prize in 1949 in recognition of his books "Ba-Aravah" ("In the Wilderness") and "Ba-Har u'va-Gai" ("In Mountain and Valley").

=== Ideology and politics ===
Smilansky was a delegate to the Seventh Zionist Congress in Basel in 1905.

Smilansky strongly believed in the value of manual labour, particularly of working the land, for what he considered to be the redemption of the Jewish people. He was one of the founders of the Hitahadut ha-Moshavot bi-Yehudah ve-Shomron ("Association of moshavot in Judea and Samaria"), whose chairman he became during its early years. Smilansky worked as the editor of the Association's Hitahdut HaIkarim weekly "Bustenai" ("Orchard Farmer") from 1929 to 1937. He was also active during the 1920s and 1930s in organisations for the reclamation and acquisition of land, especially in the Negev.

Smilansky's political views, as reflected in many of his articles in the Hebrew press (particularly in Haaretz), were close to those of Chaim Weizmann, and he was prominent in his activities towards peaceful coexistence with the Arabs. A close ally of Brit Shalom from 1925 till its disintegration, Smilansky, during the 1930s, was a member of "The Five" (together with Gad Frumkin, Pinhas Rutenberg, Moshe Novomeysky, and Judah Leon Magnes), who met with Arab leaders in an attempt to explore the idea of a bi-national state, founded on a vision of economic integration and a legislative council based on parity, that would enable Zionist development. During the 1940s, Smilansky, for a similar reason, opposed the struggle against the British in Palestine. In 1946, Smilansky, together with Magnes and Martin Buber, all members of the small Ihud ("Unity") binationalist Zionist party, advocated the establishment of an Arab-Jewish state to the Anglo-American Committee of Inquiry.

=== Military activity ===
Smilansky volunteered to the Jewish Legion in 1918, and was the commander of the Haganah organisation in Rehovot during the 1921 Jaffa Riots.

== Death ==
Smilansky died in Tel Aviv and was buried in Rehovot in 1953.

== Legacy ==
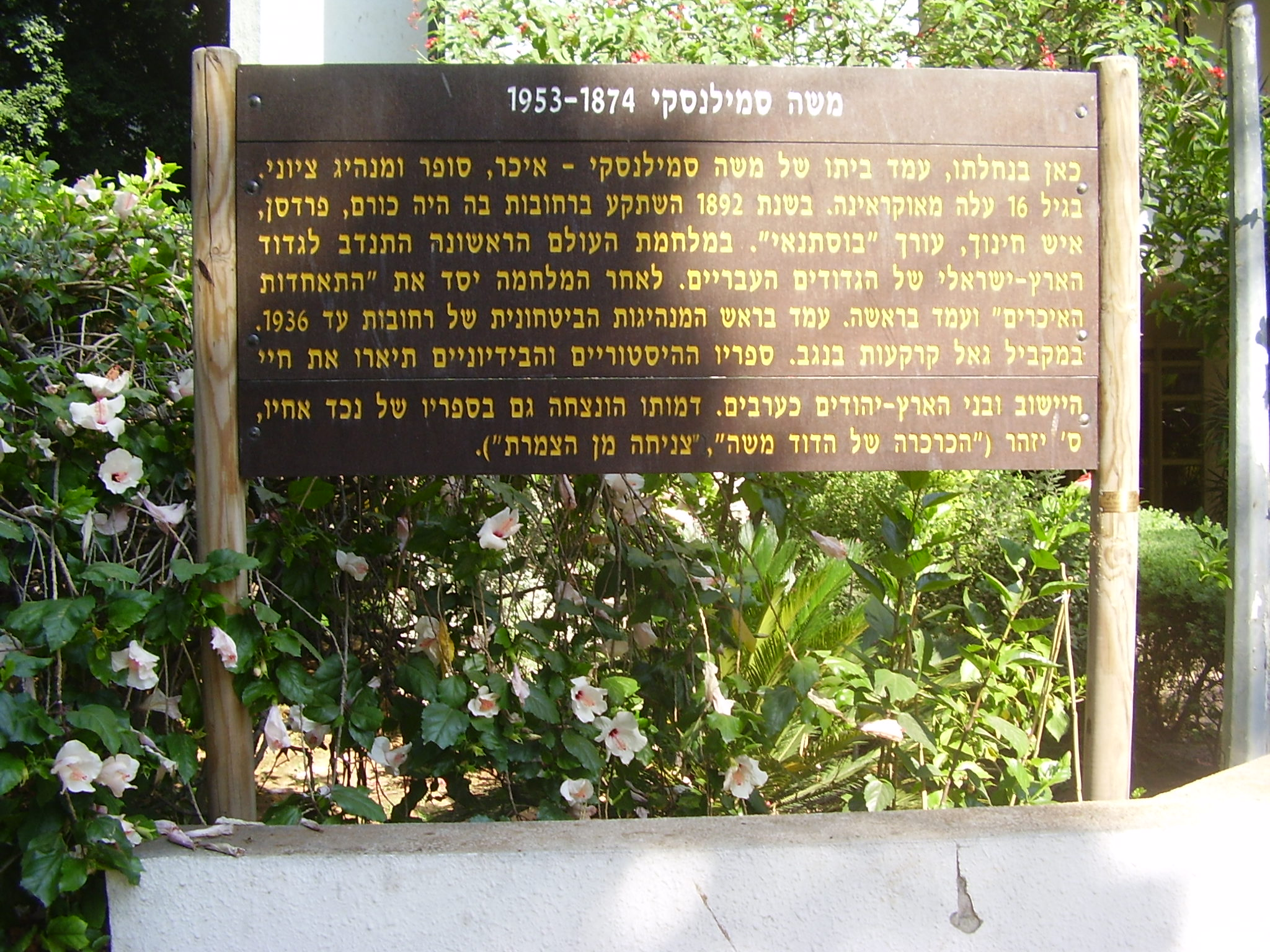
Commemorative plaque in Rehovot

The Farmer's Association founded a new colony named after him, Kfar Moshe ("Moshe's Village"), on his 60th birthday.

Moshav Nir Moshe, founded in the Negev in the year of his death, 1953, was called after Smilansky.

== Relatives ==
Smilansky was the brother of novelist Meir Smilansky (who published under the pen name M. Secco) and psychoanalyst Anna Smeliansky (who worked in the 1920s at the Berlin Psychoanalytic Institute before emigrating to Mandatory Palestine in 1933, where she was a founding member of the Palestine Psychoanalytic Association, later the Israeli Psychoanalytic Society). Smilansky was the uncle of writer Zev Smilansky, and the great-uncle of his son, novelist S. Yizhar, who wrote about Smilansky in his 1973 memoir, Ha-Merkavah Shel Ha-Dod Moshe ("Uncle Moshe's Chariot").

== Published works ==
- Sons of Arabia [Bnei Arav] (stories), under the pen-name Khawaja Moussa, lit. "Master Moshe" (Odessa, 1911)
- Toldot Ahavah Ahat (1911)
- Tovah (1924 or 1925)
- Zikhronot (3 vols., 1924 or 1925 - 1929)
- Me-Haye ha-Arvim (1925)
- Ha-ityashvut ha-Haklait (1926 or 1927)
- Rehovot (1929)
- The Hebrew Settlement and the Arab Farmer [Ha-Hityashvut ha-Ivrit ve'ha-Falah] (non-fiction, 1929 or 1930; 1947)
- Haderah (1930)
- By the Yarkon River [Al Hof Hayarkon] (stories; 1936, 1966)
- Moshe Smilansky's Works [Kitvei Moshe Smilansky] (12 vols., 1933–1937)
- Palestine Caravan (1935)
- Hadera (non-fiction, 1936)
- Perakim be-Toldot ha-Yishuv (non-fiction, 6 vols., 1939–1947)
- Birkat ha-adamah (1941 or 1942)
- Ha-Yishuv ha-Ivri (1941 or 1942)
- Unknown Pioneers [Mishpahat ha-Adamah] (non-fiction, 4 vols., 1943–53)
- Bi-Yeme Elem (1943)
- The Path to Redemption [Maslul ha-Geulah] (non-fiction), published by KKL-Jewish National Fund (1943 or 1944)
- Jacob the Soldier (1944)
- In the Fields of Ukraine [Bi-Sedot Ukrainah] (1944)
- Sipur Geulat ha-Adamah ba-Arets (1944 or 1945)
- Yehoshua Hankin (1945 or 1946)
- Grandfather's Tales [Sipurei Saba] (1946)
- In the Steppe [Ba-Aravah] (1946)
- Yishuv Stories [Sipurei ha-Yishuv] (1948)
- Ben Karme Yehudah (1948)
- In Mountain and Valley [Ba-Har u'va-Gai] (stories, 1948)
- The Land's Redeemers [Goalei Ha-Karka] (non-fiction), published by KKL-Jewish National Fund, (1947 or 1949)
- Friends [Haverim] (1949)
- Rehovot: 60 Years of Its Existence [Rehovot: 60 Shenot Hayeha] (non-fiction, 1950)
- In the Shadow of the Orchards [Be-Tsel ha-Pardesim] (1951)
- Shemesh Aviv (1952)
- Rebirth and the Holocaust [Tekumah ve-Sho'ah] (1952 or 1953)
- Ness-Tziona (non-fiction), 1953
- Mishut ba-Arets (1953)
- Hevle Ledah (1953 or 1954)
- Farewell [Im Preidah], 1955
- Hu Ahav et ha-Yarden (1962)

Posthumously:

- The History of the Yishuv [Pirkei Toldot Ha-Yeshuv] (non-fiction, 1978)

== See also ==
- Israeli literature
