= List of members of the first Knesset =

The 120 members of the first Knesset were elected on 25 January 1949. The breakdown by party was as follows:

- Mapai: 46
- Mapam: 19 (gained one member during the Knesset term)
- United Religious Front: 16
- Herut: 14 (lost two members during the Knesset term)
- General Zionists: 7
- Progressive Party: 5
- Sephardim and Oriental Communities: 4
- Maki: 4 (lost one member during the Knesset term)
- Democratic List of Nazareth: 2
- Fighters' List: 1
- WIZO: 1
- Yemenite Association: 1

== Members of the Knesset ==
Party	Name	Note
Mapai (46)	Meir Argov	
Mapai (46)	Ami Assaf	
Mapai (46)	Zalman Aran	
Mapai (46)	Yitzhak Ben-Zvi	
Mapai (46)	Aryeh Bahir	
Mapai (46)	David Bar-Rav-Hai	
Mapai (46)	Yosef Beretz	
Mapai (46)	Haim Ben-Asher	
Mapai (46)	David Ben-Gurion	Prime Minister, Minister of Defense
Mapai (46)	Shmuel Dayan	
Mapai (46)	Ben-Zion Dinor	
Mapai (46)	Hasya Drori	
Mapai (46)	Yehiel Duvdevani	
Mapai (46)	Yosef Efrati	
Mapai (46)	Heshel Frumkin	Replaced by Jenia Tversky on 5/2/1951
Mapai (46)	Shraga Goren	
Mapai (46)	Akiva Govrin	
Mapai (46)	Yisrael Guri	
Mapai (46)	Eliyahu Hacarmeli	
Mapai (46)	David Hacohen	
Mapai (46)	Neta Harpaz	
Mapai (46)	Avraham Herzfeld	
Mapai (46)	Abba Hushi	Replaced by Baruch Osnia on 12/2/1951
Mapai (46)	Beba Idelson	
Mapai (46)	Eliezer Kaplan	Minister of Finance, Minister of Trade and Industry
Mapai (46)	Yona Kesse	
Mapai (46)	Yosef-Michael Lamm	Replaced by Rafael Bash on 21/5/1951
Mapai (46)	Shlomo Lavi	
Mapai (46)	Pinhas Lavon	Minister of Agriculture (second government)
Mapai (46)	Eliezer Livna	
Mapai (46)	Ada Maimon	
Mapai (46)	Golda Meir	Minister of Labour and Social Security
Mapai (46)	Peretz Naftali	
Mapai (46)	Dvora Netzer	
Mapai (46)	David Remez	Minister of Transportation (first government), Minister of Education and Culture (second government), replaced by Menachem Cohen on 19/5/1951
Mapai (46)	Moshe Sharett	Minister of Foreign Affairs
Mapai (46)	Zalman Shazar	Minister of Education and Culture (first government)
Mapai (46)	Aryeh Sheftel	Replaced by Yisrael Yeshayahu on 12/2/1951
Mapai (46)	Reuven Shari	Deputy Minister of Transportation (second government)
Mapai (46)	Yosef Sprinzak	
Mapai (46)	Yizhar Smilansky	
Mapai (46)	Yehudit Simhonit	Replaced by Herzl Berger on 5/2/1951
Mapai (46)	Efraim Taburi	
Mapai (46)	Avraham Taviv	Replaced by Yitzhak Kanav on 20/4/1950
Mapai (46)	Zvi Yehuda	
Mapai (46)	Dov Yosef	Minister of Agriculture, Minister of Rationing and Supply (first government), Minister of Transportation (second government)
Mapam (19)	Moshe Aram	
Mapam (19)	Menachem Bader	
Mapam (19)	Dov Bar-Nir	Replaced by Menachem Ratzon on 10/4/1951
Mapam (19)	Yisrael Bar-Yehuda	
Mapam (19)	Yitzhak Ben-Aharon	
Mapam (19)	Mordechai Bentov	
Mapam (19)	Yaakov Hazan	
Mapam (19)	Yisrael Galili	
Mapam (19)	Fayge Ilanit	
Mapam (19)	Hannah Lamdan	
Mapam (19)	Nahum Nir	
Mapam (19)	Eliezer Peri	
Mapam (19)	Berl Repetur	
Mapam (19)	Ya'akov Riftin	
Mapam (19)	Hanan Rubin	
Mapam (19)	Moshe Sneh	
Mapam (19)	Yitzhak Tabenkin	Replaced by David Livschitz on 12/4/1951
Mapam (19)	Meir Yaari	
Mapam (19)	Aharon Zisling	
United Religious Front (16)	Yosef Burg	
United Religious Front (16)	Moshe Kelmer	Replaced by Eliyahu Mazur on 11/3/1949
United Religious Front (16)	Eliyahu-Moshe Ganhovsky	
United Religious Front (16)	Avraham-Yehuda Goldrat	
United Religious Front (16)	Aharon-Ya'akov Greenberg	
United Religious Front (16)	Kalman Kahana	
United Religious Front (16)	Meir-David Levenstein	
United Religious Front (16)	Yitzhak-Meir Levin	Minister of Welfare
United Religious Front (16)	Yehuda Leib Maimon	Minister of Religions and War Victims
United Religious Front (16)	Benjamin Mintz	
United Religious Front (16)	Mordechai Nurock	
United Religious Front (16)	David-Zvi Pinkas	
United Religious Front (16)	Avraham-Haim Shag	
United Religious Front (16)	Haim-Moshe Shapira	Minister of Health, Minister of Immigration, Minister of Internal Affairs
United Religious Front (16)	Moshe Unna	
United Religious Front (16)	Zerach Warhaftig	
Herut (14)	Menachem Begin	
Herut (14)	Yohanan Bader	
Herut (14)	Aryeh Ben-Eliezer	
Herut (14)	Haim Cohen-Meguri	
Herut (14)	Uri-Zvi Greenberg	
Herut (14)	Ari Jabotinsky	Left the party to sit as an independent
Herut (14)	Shmuel Katz	
Herut (14)	Hillel Kook	Left the party to sit as an independent
Herut (14)	Haim Landau	
Herut (14)	Eliyahu Lankin	
Herut (14)	Yaakov Meridor	
Herut (14)	Shmuel Merlin	
Herut (14)	Avraham Rakanti	
Herut (14)	Esther Raziel-Naor	
General Zionists (7)	Peretz Bernstein	
General Zionists (7)	Ya'akov Gil	
General Zionists (7)	Ya'akov Klivnov	
General Zionists (7)	Shoshana Parsitz	
General Zionists (7)	Israel Rokach	
General Zionists (7)	Yosef Sapir	
General Zionists (7)	Yosef Serlin	
Progressive Party (5)	Idov Cohen	
Progressive Party (5)	Yeshayahu Forder	
Progressive Party (5)	Avraham Granot	
Progressive Party (5)	Yizhar Harari	
Progressive Party (5)	Pinchas Rosen	Minister of Justice
Maki (4)	Shmuel Mikunis	
Maki (4)	Eliezer Preminger	Left to form the Hebrew Communists before joining Mapam
Maki (4)	Tawfik Toubi	
Maki (4)	Meir Vilner	
Sephardim & Oriental Communities (4)	Moshe Ben-Ami	
Sephardim & Oriental Communities (4)	Eliyahu Eliashar	
Sephardim & Oriental Communities (4)	Avraham Elmalih	
Sephardim & Oriental Communities (4)	Bechor-Shalom Sheetrit	Minister of Police
Democratic List of Nazareth (2)	Seif-El-Din El-Zubi	
Democratic List of Nazareth (2)	Amin-Salim Jarjora	
Fighters' List (1)	Nathan Yellin-Mor	
Yemenite Association (1)	Zecharia Glosca	
WIZO (1)	Rachel Cohen-Kagan	

=== Replacements ===
MK	Replaced	Party	Date
Eliyahu Mazur	Moshe Kelmer	United Religious Front	11 March 1949
Yitzhak Kanav	Avraham Taviv	Mapai	20 April 1950
Herzl Berger	Yehudit Simhonit	Mapai	5 February 1951
Jenia Tversky	Heshel Frumkin	Mapai	5 February 1951
Yisrael Yeshayahu	Aryeh Sheftel	Mapai	12 February 1951
Baruch Osnia	Abba Hushi	Mapai	12 February 1951
Menachem Ratzon	Dov Bar-Nir	Mapam	10 April 1951
David Livschitz	Yitzhak Tabenkin	Mapam	12 April 1951
Menachem Cohen	David Remez	Mapai	19 May 1951
Rafael Bash	Yosef-Michael Lamm	Mapai	21 May 1951

== See also ==
- Knesset
- List of Knesset speakers
- List of political parties in Israel
- List of Israelis
- List of Likud Knesset Members
- Prime Minister of Israel
- President of Israel
- Politics of Israel
