= List of members of the Knesset who died in office =

The following is a list of members of the Knesset who died in office.

== List ==
Member	Party	Date of death	Age at death (years)	Cause
Avraham Taviv	Mapai	20 April 1950	60-61	
Yehezkel Hen	Mapai	4 April 1952	69-70	
Eliezer Kaplan	Mapai	13 July 1952	61	
David-Zvi Pinkas	Mizrachi	14 August 1952	56	Heart disease
Eliyahu Hacarmeli	Mapai	21 December 1952	61	
Avraham Deutsch	Agudat Yisrael	25 May 1953	63-64	
Yitzhak Yitzhaky	Mapam	21 September 1955	52	
Haim Ariav	General Zionists	18 June 1957	62	
Avraham Abaas	Ahdut HaAvoda	17 September 1958	45-46	
Yosef Sprinzak	Mapai	28 January 1959	73	
Zalman Ben-Ya'akov	Religious Torah Front	2 March 1959	61-62	
Shimshon Unichman	Herut	21 March 1961	54	
Binyamin Mintz	PAI	30 May 1961	58	
Giora Yoseftal	Mapai	23 August 1962	50	
Herzl Berger	Mapai	29 August 1962	58	
Hanan Rubin	Mapam	24 October 1962	54	
Mordechai Nurock	Mafdal	9 November 1962	74	Heart disease
Aharon-Ya'akov Greenberg	Mafdal	2 April 1963	63	
Ami Assaf	Mapai	17 May 1963	61	Heart attack
Meir Argov	Mapai	24 November 1963	57	Heart attack
Jenia Tversky	Mapai	9 April 1964	59	
Avraham Drori	Herut	20 August 1964	45	
Yisrael Bar-Yehuda	Ahdut HaAvoda	4 May 1965	69	
Moshe Sharett	Mapai	7 July 1965	70	Lung cancer
Eliyahu Meridor	Gahal	16 October 1966	52	
Bechor-Shalom Sheetrit	Alignment	28 January 1967	71-72	
Ya'akov Katz	PAI	21 December 1967	60	
Levi Eshkol	Labor	26 February 1969	73	Heart attack
Aryeh Ben-Eliezer	Gahal	29 January 1970	56	
Haim-Moshe Shapira	Mafdal	16 July 1970	68	
Shlomo-Yisrael Ben-Meir	Mafdal	4 April 1971	60	
Yitzhak-Meir Levin	Agudat Yisrael	7 August 1971	78	
Mordechai Ofer	Alignment	1 September 1971	47	
Yosef Sapir	Gahal	26 February 1972	70	
Moshe Sneh	Maki	1 March 1972	63	
Reuven Barkat	Alignment	5 April 1972	65	
Abd el-Aziz el-Zoubi	Alignment	14 February 1974	48	
Uzi Feinerman	Alignment	8 April 1975	50-51	
Michael Hasani	Mafdal	2 July 1975	62	
Pinchas Sapir	Alignment	12 August 1975	68	Heart attack
Zvi Guershoni	Alignment	1 September 1976	60-61	
Avraham Ofer	Alignment	3 January 1977	54-55	Suicide
Yehoshua Rabinovitz	Alignment	14 August 1979	67	Heart attack
Yigal Allon	Alignment	29 February 1980	61	Heart failure
Hamad Abu Rabia	Ra'am	12 January 1981	51-52	Assassinated
Hanna Mwais	Hadash	13 February 1981	67-68	
Moshe Dayan	Telem (1981 political party)	16 October 1981	66	Heart attack, colon cancer
Moshe Harif	Alignment	16 January 1982	48	Traffic collision
David Shiffman	Likud	18 October 1982	59	
Simcha Erlich	Likud	19 June 1983	67	
Yitzhak Seiger	Likud	5 February 1985	48	
Michael Reisser	Likud	27 October 1988	42	Traffic collision
Yigal Cohen	Likud	6 December 1988	59-60	
Tawfiq Ziad	Hadash	5 July 1994	65	Traffic collision
Mordechai Gur	Labor	16 July 1995	65	Suicide
Haim Kaufman	Likud	7 August 1995	60	
Yitzhak Rabin	Labor	4 November 1995	73	Assassinated
Ariel Weinstein	Likud	20 July 1996	63	Heart attack
Avraham Stern	Mafdal	12 May 1997	61	
Zevulun Hammer	Mafdal	20 January 1998	61	
Rehavam Ze'evi	National Union	17 October 2001	75	Assassinated during the Second Intifada
Yehudit Naot	Shinui	16 December 2004	60	Throat cancer
Yuri Stern	Yisrael Beiteinu	16 January 2007	57	Cancer
Avraham Ravitz	UTJ	26 January 2009	57	Heart disease
Ze'ev Boim	Kadima	18 March 2011	67	Cancer
Gideon Ezra	Kadima	17 May 2012	74	Lung cancer
Uri Orbach	Jewish Home	16 February 2015	54	Chronic hematologic disease
Said al-Harumi	Ra'am	25 August 2021	49	Heart attack
