= Shlomo-Yisrael Ben-Meir =

Israeli politician (1910–1971)

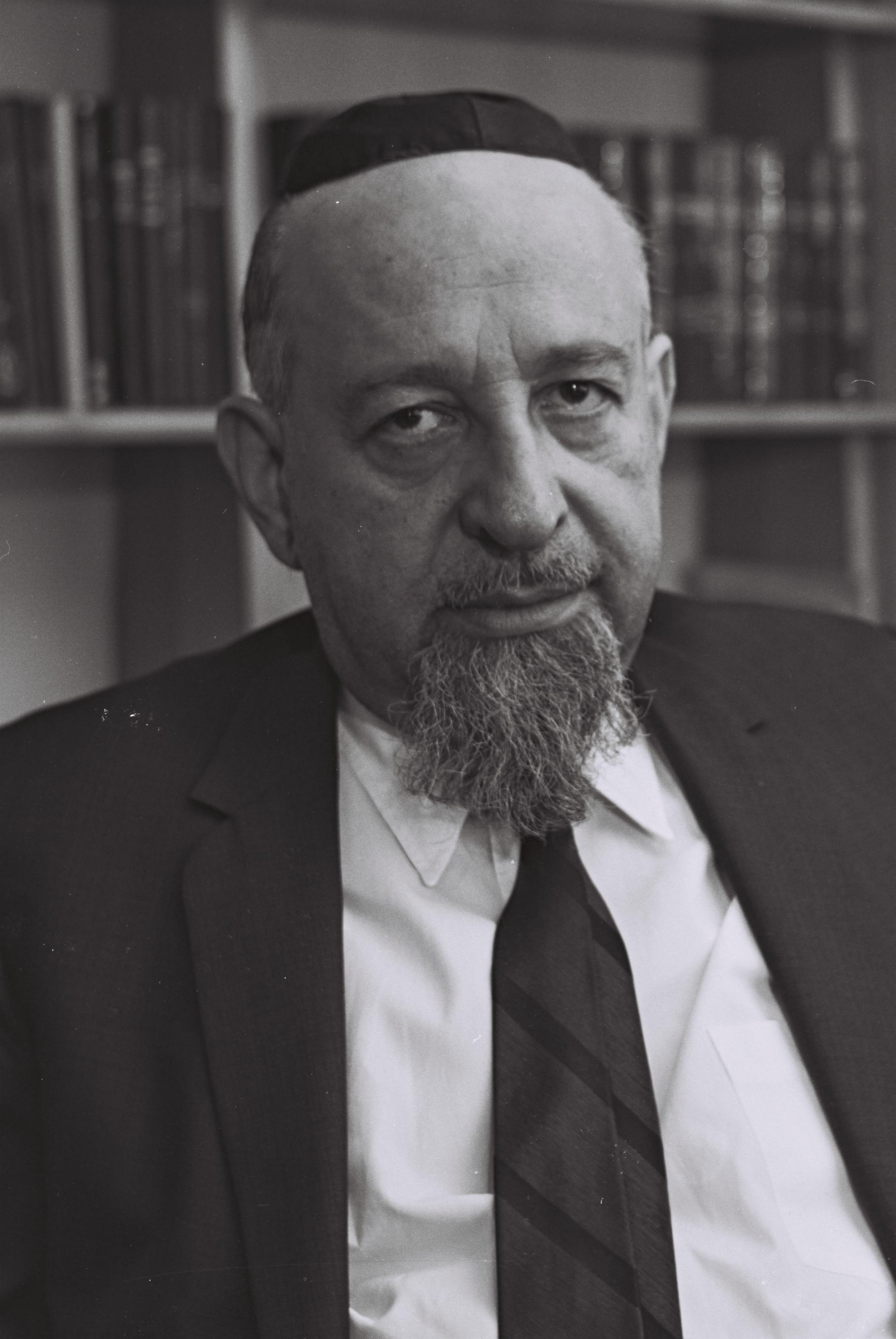
- Ben-Meir in 1969

Faction represented in the Knesset
- 1952-1956: Mizrachi
- 1956-1971: National Religious Party

Personal details
- Born: 13 August 1910 Warsaw, Russian Empire
- Died: 4 April 1971 (aged 60)

Shlomo-Yisrael Ben-Meir (Hebrew: שלמה-ישראל בן-מאיר; 13 August 1910 – 4 April 1971) was an Israeli politician who served as a member of the Knesset from 1952 until his death.

== Biography ==
Born Shlomo-Yisrael Rosenberg in Warsaw in the Russian Empire (today in Poland), Ben-Meir was educated at the Yitzchak Elchanan yeshiva, before studying at Yeshiva University and New York University. He was certified as a rabbi and was awarded a doctorate in law. He worked as a lawyer in New York City until 1940, when he became rabbi of Hartford in Connecticut. Between 1937 and 1941 he was a member of the board of directors of the American branches of the Jewish National Fund and Keren Hayesod.

In 1950 he emigrated to Israel. In the same year he became world chairman of the Mizrachi movement, and in Israel was chairman of the national council. He was given a place on the list of the organisation's political branch for the 1951 elections, but failed to win a seat. However, he entered the Knesset on 14 August 1952 as a replacement for the deceased David-Zvi Pinkas, and on 5 January 1953 was appointed Deputy Minister of Welfare, serving until the government resigned on 26 January 1954. He worked towards a merger of Mizrachi and Hapoel HaMizrachi, which was partially achieved when the party ran a joint list for the 1955 elections (in which he retained his seat), and fully achieved when the two merged to form the National Religious Party in 1956. The chairman of the party's political section, he served as Deputy Minister of Welfare again between 13 January and 1 July 1958.

He retained his seat again in the 1959 elections, and was appointed Deputy Minister of Internal Affairs in the ninth government. He was re-elected again in 1961, serving as a Deputy Speaker, the Deputy Minister of Internal Affairs from 18 February 1963 onwards, and also as Deputy Minister of Health from 24 March 1965 until the government left office on 12 January 1966.

After re-election in 1965 and 1969, he remained Deputy Minister of Internal Affairs until his death on 4 April 1971. His seat was taken by his son Yehuda, who served as a Knesset member until 1984.
