= Lists of Knesset members =

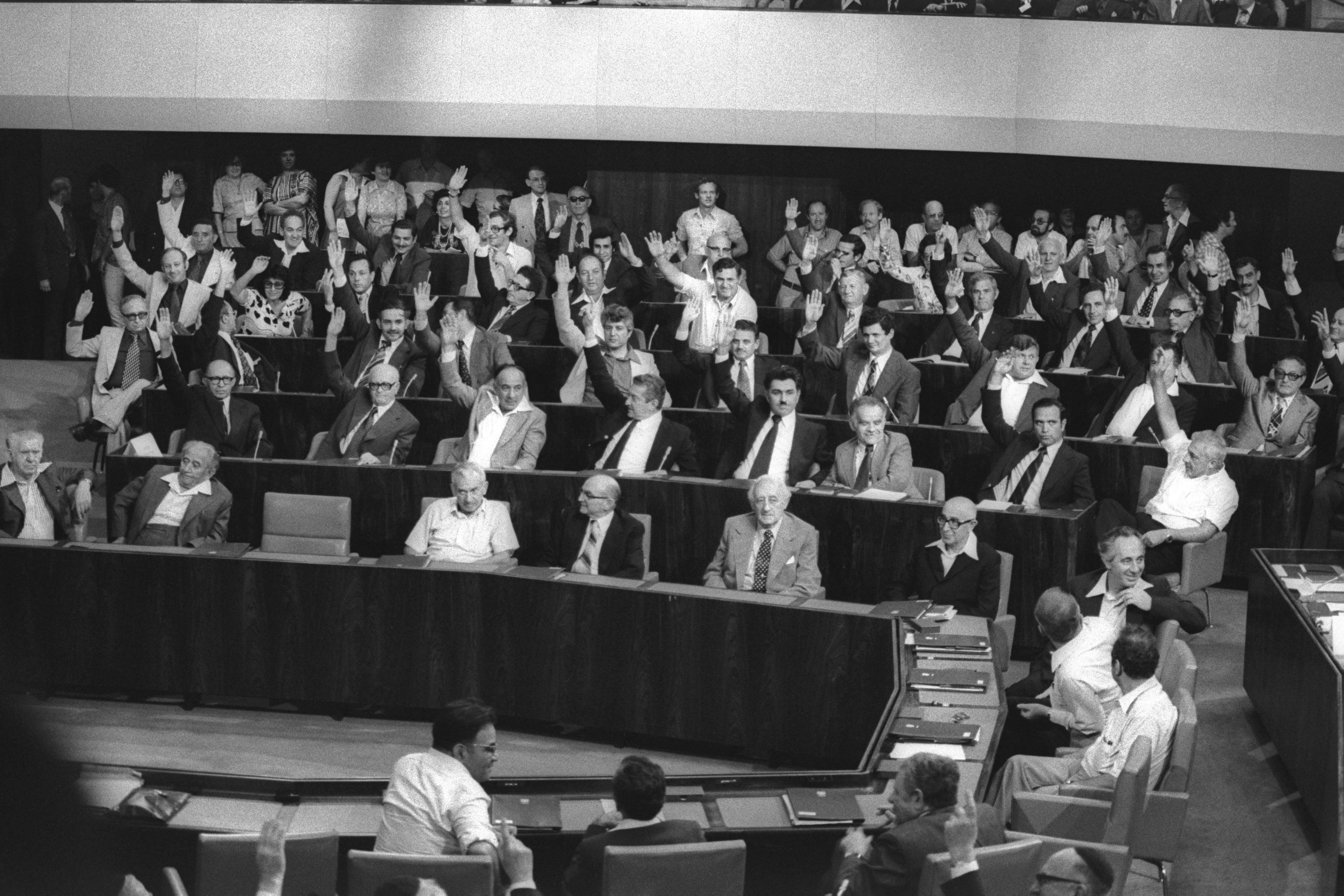
Likud MKs raise their hands in favor of Yitzhak Shamir as speaker of the 9th Knesset behind a glum government bench.

Lists of Knesset members cover members of the Knesset of Israel. They are organized by session, by ethnicity and by position.

== By session ==
- List of members of the first Knesset (1949–51)
- List of members of the second Knesset (1951–55)
- List of members of the third Knesset (1955–59)
- List of members of the fourth Knesset (1959–61)
- List of members of the fifth Knesset (1961–65)
- List of members of the sixth Knesset (1965–69)
- List of members of the seventh Knesset (1969–74)
- List of members of the eighth Knesset (1974–77)
- List of members of the ninth Knesset (1977–81)
- List of members of the tenth Knesset (1981–84)
- List of members of the eleventh Knesset (1984–88)
- List of members of the twelfth Knesset (1988–92)
- List of members of the thirteenth Knesset (1992–96)
- List of members of the fourteenth Knesset (1996–99)
- List of members of the fifteenth Knesset (1999–2003)
- List of members of the sixteenth Knesset (2003–06)
- List of members of the seventeenth Knesset (2006–09)
- List of members of the eighteenth Knesset (2009–13)
- List of members of the nineteenth Knesset (2013–15)
- List of members of the twentieth Knesset (2015–19)
- List of members of the twenty-first Knesset (2019)
- List of members of the twenty-second Knesset (2019–20)
- List of members of the twenty-third Knesset (2020–21)
- List of members of the twenty-fourth Knesset (2021–22)
- List of members of the twenty-fifth Knesset (2022–2026)
- List of members of the twenty-sixth Knesset (2026–)

== By ethnicity ==
- List of Arab members of the Knesset

== By position ==
- List of prime ministers of Israel
- List of Knesset speakers

== By party ==
- List of Likud Knesset members

== Other ==
- List of members of the Knesset who died in office
