= Shalom-Avraham Shaki =

Israeli politician

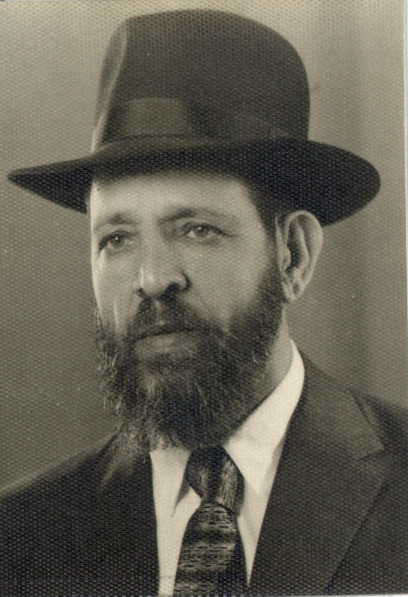
- Shaki during his time in the Knesset

Faction represented in the Knesset
- 1962–1965: National Religious Party

Personal details
- Born: 1906 Ottoman Empire
- Died: 4 November 1990 (aged 83–84)

Shalom-Avraham Shaki (Hebrew: שלום-אברהם שאקי; 1906 – 4 November 1990) was an Israeli politician who served as a member of the Knesset for the National Religious Party between 1962 and 1965.

== Biography ==
Born in Yemen in the Ottoman Empire, Shaki emigrated to Palestine in 1914. He was educated at a religious school and college before attending a religious teachers' seminary. He also studied at the Institute for Middle Eastern Studies at the Hebrew University of Jerusalem.

In 1929 he began working as a teacher in Hadera, before switching to Tel Aviv the following year, where he worked until 1951. Between 1950 and 1951 he was headmaster of a religious school in a Yemenite ma'abara in Ein Shemer. From 1952 until 1963 he was headmaster of a school in Bnei Brak.

Having been a member of Hapoel HaMizrachi, Shaki became a member of the National Religious Party when it was founded by a merger of Hapoel HaMizrachi and Mizrachi. Shaki was on the party's list for the 1961 elections. Although he failed to win a seat, he entered the Knesset on 8 November 1962 as a replacement for the deceased Mordechai Nurock. However, he lost his seat in the 1965 elections.

His daughter, Tehila, is married to Breslov rosh yeshiva Eliezer Berland. He died in 1990.
