= 1925 Assembly of Representatives election =

Election for the Assembly of Representatives

- 6 December 1925
- 221 seats in the Assembly of Representatives
- Turnout: 57%
Party	Leader	Seats
Ahdut HaAvoda	David Ben-Gurion	54
Hapoel Hatzair	Yosef Sprinzak	30
Others		20
HaSephardim		19
Hatzohar	Ze'ev Jabotinsky	15
Hebrew Women's Association	Beba Idelson	13
Agricultural Bloc		13
Democrat's Association		12
Mizrachi	Yehuda Leib Maimon	7
Centre List		6
National Citizens		6
Ma'amad Hapoalim		6
Hapoel HaMizrachi		6
Hapoel HaMizrachi HaMeuhad		4
Polish List		4
Valley Kibbutzim List		2
Safed Municipality List		2
HaMerkaz HaHakla'i		1
Galilee Farmers Association		1
Eastern Farmers Association		1
Georgian's List		1
Hebrew Women's Popular list		1
Givat HaRambam list		1
Young Mizrachi List		1
Craftsmen's Centre		1
Bnei Brak Residents' List		1
This lists parties that won seats. See the complete results below.
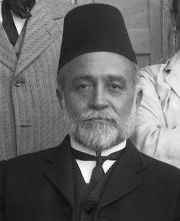

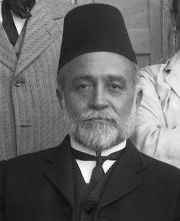
President of the Jewish National Council before	President of the Jewish National Council after
David Yellin; Independent	David Yellin; Independent

Elections to the Assembly of Representatives in Mandatory Palestine were held on 6 December 1925, electing the legislature of the Yishuv. Around half the votes went to parties associated with trade unions. Ahdut HaAvoda remained the largest party in the Assembly.

== Electoral system ==
Following the 1920 elections, debate continued on the issue of women's suffrage. In 1923 Mizrachi called for a men-only referendum on whether women should be entitled to vote, and threatened to withdraw from the Yishuv if one was not held. The Jewish National Council agreed to hold one on 8 November 1925, but with female participation. This led to Agudat Yisrael calling for a boycott. In response, Mizrachi and the Jewish National Council agreed to cancel the referendum.

The number of eligible voters rose from around 26,000 to 64,764. However, turnout was only around 57%. This was put down to an Agudat Yisrael boycott, several delays in holding the elections, and the unfamiliarity of some women with voting.

The number of seats was reduced from 314 to 221.

== Results ==
Party	Votes	%	Seats	+/–
Ahdut HaAvoda	8,834		54	–16
Hapoel Hatzair	5,337		30	–11
HaSephardim			19	–35
Revisionists			15	New
Hebrew Women's Association			13	New
Agricultural Bloc			9	New
Democrat's Association			9	New
Mizrachi			7	–2
Centre List			6	New
National Citizens			6	New
Ma'amad Hapoalim	1,028		6	New
Hapoel HaMizrachi			6	New
Hapoel HaMizrachi HaMeuhad			4	New
Polish Immigrants List			4	New
Valley Kibbutzim List			2	New
Safed Municipality List			2	New
HaMerkaz HaHakla'i			1	New
Galilee Farmers Association			1	New
Eastern Farmers Association			1	New
Georgian's List			1	New
Hebrew Women's Popular list			1	New
Givat HaRambam list			1	New
Young Mizrachi List			1	–1
Craftsmen's Centre			1	–5
Bnei Brak Residents' List			1	New
Others			20	–
Total			221	–93
Total votes	35,987	–		
Registered voters/turnout	64,764	55.57		
Source: Mackie & Rose
