= Moshe Unna =

Israeli politician (1902–1989)

- משה אונא
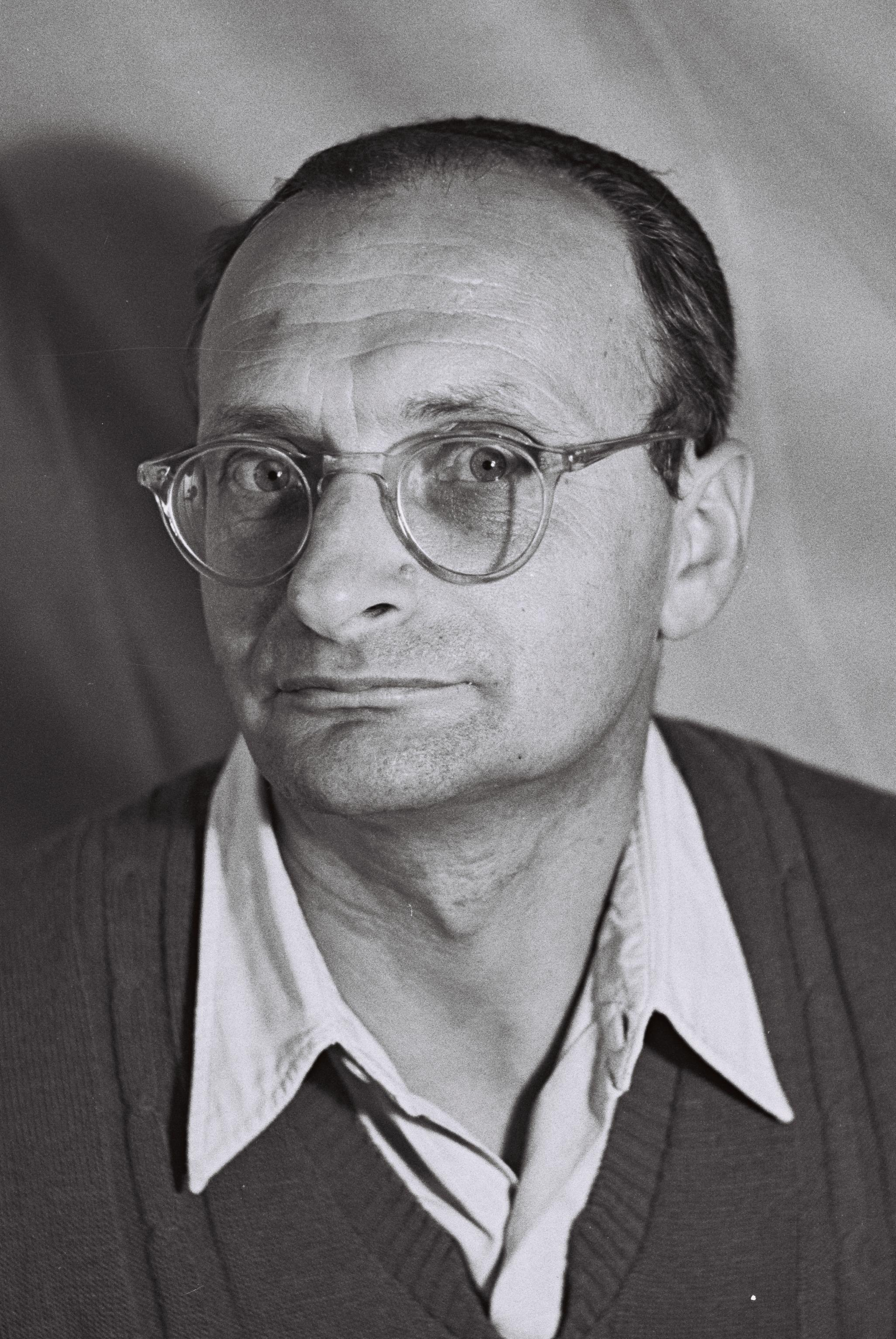
- Unna in 1951

Faction represented in the Knesset
- 1949–1951: United Religious Front
- 1951–1955: Hapoel HaMizrachi
- 1955–1969: National Religious Party

Personal details
- Born: 22 November 1902; Mannheim, Germany
- Died: 21 February 1989 (aged 86)

Moshe Unna (Hebrew: משה אונא; 22 November 1902 – 21 February 1989) was an Israeli politician who served as a member of the Knesset for the United Religious Front, Hapoel HaMizrachi and the National Religious Party between 1949 and 1969.

== Biography ==
Born in Mannheim in Germany, Unna attended an agricultural school and a rabbinical seminary in Berlin, earning a diploma in agronomy. He joined the Blue-White and Young Mizrachi movements, and in 1924 was appointed manager of the Mizrachi agricultural estate in Germany.

In 1927, he made aliyah to Mandatory Palestine, where he worked in orchards. He returned to Germany in 1931 and 1933 as an emissary. In 1934, he joined Youth Aliyah, which also employed him.

In 1935, he was amongst the founders of the Religious Kibbutz Movement, and served on its secretariat until 1974. In 1937, he helped establish Tirat Zvi, a religious Kibbutz in the Beit She'an Valley. In 1940 he became a member of the Assembly of Representatives and the Jewish National Council. Two years later he became a member of Hapoel HaMizrachi's executive committee, serving as treasurer from 1942 until 1949. In 1944, he moved to kibbutz Sde Eliyahu.

In 1949, he was elected to the first Knesset on the United Religious Front List, an alliance of the four major religious parties. He was re-elected on the Hapoel HaMizrachi list in 1951. In 1955 Hapoel HaMizrachi and Mizrachi allied to form the National Religious Party (which became a formal merger the following year), and Unna was re-elected on its list. On 22 March 1956 he was appointed Deputy Minister of Education and Culture, serving until 31 December 1957. He became again Deputy Minister of Education and Culture on 13 January 1958, but left the cabinet again on 1 July, when the NRP left the government.

Unna retained his seat in elections in 1959, 1961 and 1965, before losing his seat in the 1969 elections. He died in 1989 at the age of 86.
