= Eliyahu-Moshe Ganhovsky =

Israeli politician (1901–1971)

Eliyahu-Moshe Ganchovsky
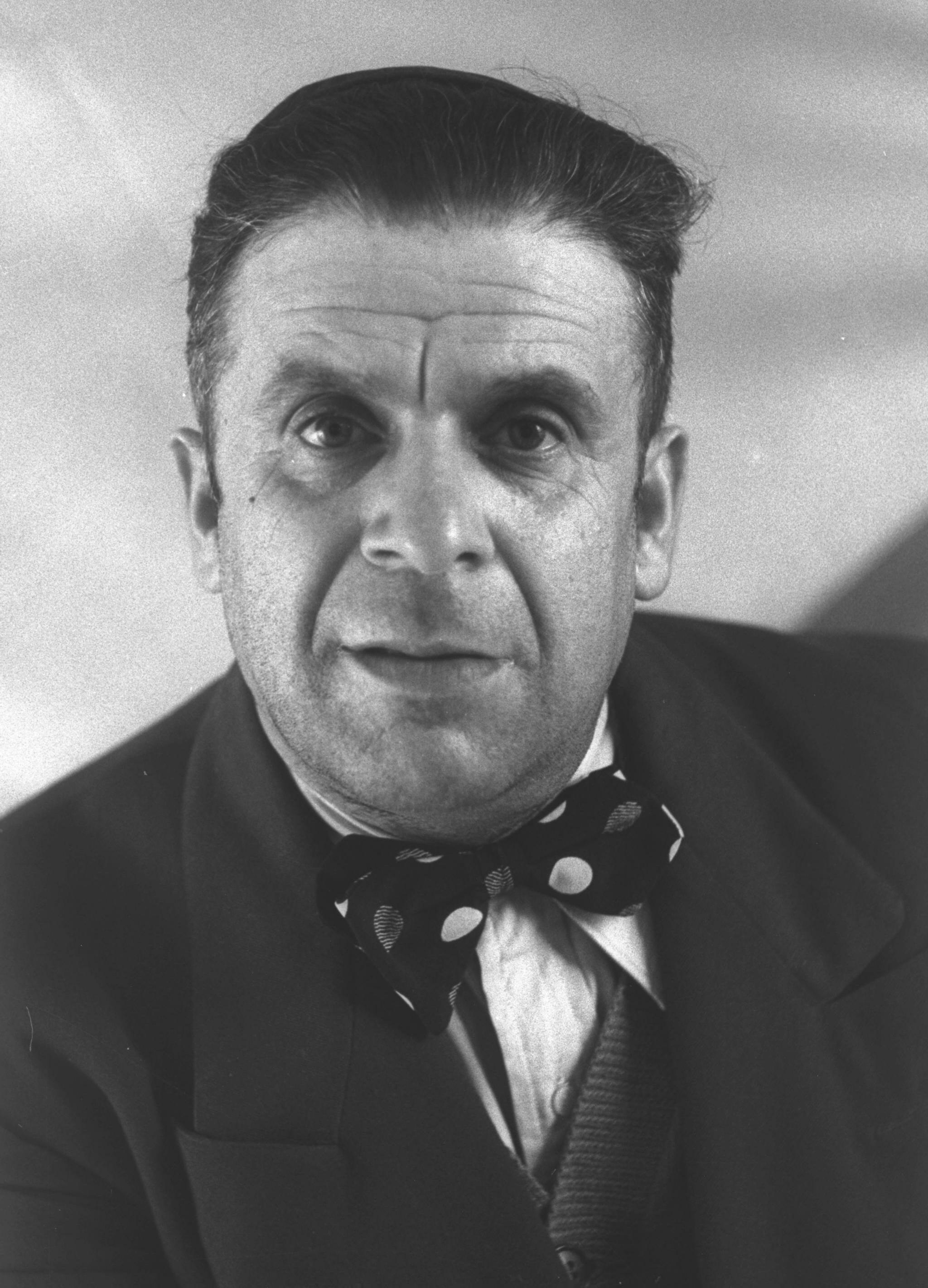
- Ganhovsky in 1951

Faction represented in the Knesset
- 1949–1951: United Religious Front
- 1951–1955: Hapoel HaMizrachi

Personal details
- Born: 23 June 1901 Grajewo, Russian Empire
- Died: 19 July 1971 (aged 70)

Eliyahu-Moshe Ganhovsky (Hebrew: אֵלִיָּהוּ־מֹשֶׁה גָּנְחוֹבְסְקִי; 23 June 1901 – 19 July 1971) was an Israeli politician and Religious Zionist activist. He served as a member of the Knesset from 1949 until 1955.

== Biography ==
Born in Grajewo in the Łomża Governorate of Congress Poland (then part of the Russian Empire), Ganhovsky studied at a rabbinical seminary in Berlin. In 1923 he was amongst the founders of the Religious Shomer and Religious Pioneer groups. In 1926, he helped organise the Young Mizrachi and League for the Religious Worker groups in Antwerp, and in 1929 became vice-president of the Belgian Zionist Federation.

In 1932 he emigrated to Mandatory Palestine. The following year, he became a member of Mizrachi's World Central Committee, a position he held until 1942. He was also a member of the executive committee of Hapoel HaMizrachi, a founder of the Mizrachi-affiliated HaTzofe newspaper, and was part of the El Makor faction which advocated political activism. He opened a publishing house named El-Hamekorot, where he published the Talmud with the commentaries of Rabbi Avrohom Yeshaya Karelitz among many other sefarim. The commentaries were printed at the back of the Talmud under the title Gilyonos Chazon Ish, and were organized by Eliyahu-Moshe's son, Avrohom.

He was elected to the first Knesset in 1949 on the United Religious Front list (an alliance of the four major religious parties), and was re-elected in 1951, when Hapoel HaMizrachi ran an independent list. He lost his seat in the 1955 elections, and died in 1971. He was buried in Shomrei Shabbat Cemetery in Bnei Brak.
