= Der Moment (Montevideo) =

Yiddish-language weekly newspaper

- December 28, 1962 issue of Der Moment
- Type: Weekly newspaper
- Language: Yiddish
- Headquarters: Montevideo
- Country: Uruguay

Der Moment (Yiddish: דער מאָמענט) was a Yiddish language newspaper published from Montevideo, Uruguay from 1940 to 1966. The newspaper was founded in December 1940. It was initially a biweekly publication, and later became a weekly newspaper published every Friday.

Der Moment was edited and directed by Bernardo (Dov) Margulies. The newspaper had a tabloid format, with eight pages per issue. The offices of Der Moment were located at Andes 1146 in Montevideo.

Politically, the newspaper had a religious Zionist orientation. It was presented as a 'family-religious-national' weekly. The issues of Der Moment dealt mainly with social and religious matters. The newspaper was circulated in neighbouring countries.

The last issue of Der Moment was published on July 8, 1966. All in all, there were 1,166 issues of Der Moment published.
