= Avraham-Yehuda Goldrat =

Israeli journalist and politician

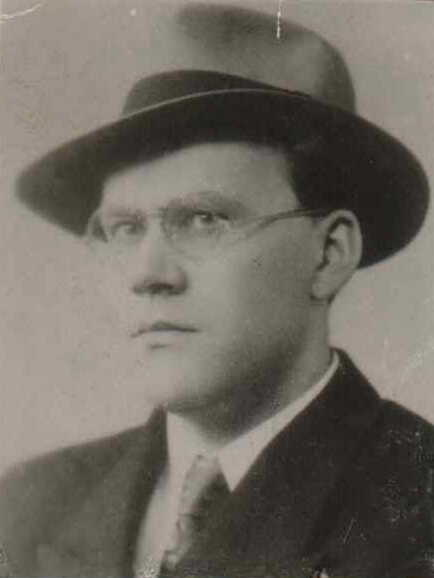

Faction represented in the Knesset
- 1949–1951: United Religious Front

Personal details
- Born: 1912 Kielce, Russian Empire
- Died: 17 June 1973 (aged 60–61)

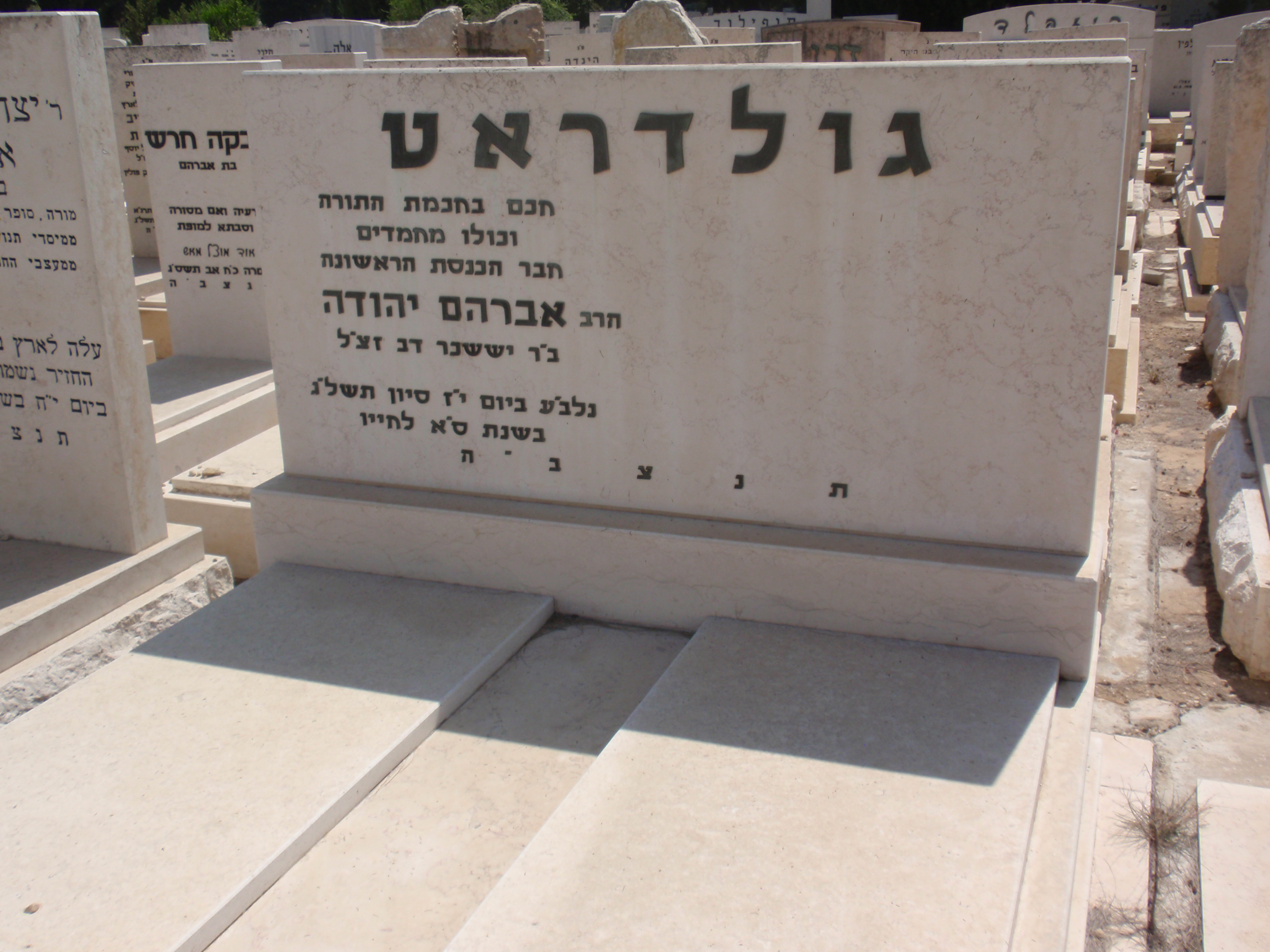
Goldrat's tombstone

Rabbi Avraham-Yehuda Goldrat (Hebrew: אַבְרָהָם יְהוּדָה גּוֹלְדְּרָאט; 1912 – 17 June 1973) was an Israeli journalist and politician who served as a member of the Knesset on behalf of the United Religious Front between 1949 and 1951.

== Biography ==
Goldrat was born in Kielce in the Russian Empire (today in Poland), the son of rabbi and author Yissachar Goldrat. He studied under the Rebbe of Ostrowiec and was ordained as a rabbi in 1930 and was also the leader of the "Youth of Agudat Yisrael" in Kielce. He later moved to Warsaw, where he worked as a journalist for the newspaper Der Yud. In 1933 he emigrated to Mandatory Palestine. In 1935 he delivered the opening speech at the founding conference of Youth of Agudat Yisrael in Tel Aviv. In 1943 he was one of the founders of the Non-Partisan Religious Union. He was appointed secretary of Poalei Agudat Yisrael and served as the editor of the newspaper Sha'arim and the weekly HaYesod. In September 1948 he travelled to the United States to attend a conference of Poalei Agudat Yisrael.

In the 1949 Constituent Assembly elections he was elected as a representative of the United Religious Front, an alliance of four religious parties. He served on the Foreign Affairs and Defense Committee, Interior Committee, and Labor Committee. In the 1951 Knesset elections he was placed third on the Poalei Agudat Yisrael list, which won only two seats.

On 25 September 1952 Agudat Yisrael and Poalei Agudat Yisrael left the government coalition due to their opposition to the conscription of women into the Israel Defense Forces. In early December Poalei Agudat Yisrael reached an agreement to rejoin the coalition. The majority within the party, led by Binyamin Mintz and Kalman Kahana, supported rejoining the coalition, while the minority, led by Goldrat and Z. Zohar, advocated for a joint front with Agudat Yisrael to oppose the government. As a result of this disagreement, a new secretariat of Poalei Agudat Yisrael was elected in January 1953, in which Goldrat and Zohar were not included.

After half of the Knesset term Goldrat demanded that Kahana resign from the Knesset to allow him to take his seat, in accordance with a rotation agreement. However, Kahana refused the orders of the party's institutions due to their disagreement over rejoining the coalition. Goldrat sought to take Kahana to a rabbinical court presided over by Isser Yehuda Unterman, but the Kahana did not attend the hearing. The Chief Rabbinate ruled that Kahana must attend the hearing. However, Goldrat was persuaded to drop the lawsuit and instead, an internal "Committee of Four" of Poalei Agudat Yisrael was appointed to resolve the matter. The committee determined that due to changes in the party's power dynamics, Kahana should continue serving in the Knesset. According to press reports, which were denied by Mintz, Kahana paid compensation to Goldrat for not honouring the rotation agreement. In January 1954 these rumours drew condemnation from the Knesset Committee.

Following the dispute, Goldrat led the internal opposition within Poalei Agudat Yisrael, which was represented at the Great Assembly of Agudat Yisrael and was claimed to include about 40% of the party. However, ahead of the 1955 Knesset elections Goldrat was not included on the Poalei Agudat Yisrael list, and in 1956 he joined the Hapoel HaMizrachi party.

In July 1956 Goldrat was elected to the 13-member executive committee of the National Religious Party, which had been formed by a merger of Hapoel HaMizrachi and Mizrachi. He was appointed head of the propaganda department. In 1967 he was appointed director of the Rambam Library in Tel Aviv, a position he held until his death in 1973.

He is the father of Eliyahu M. Goldratt.

== Views ==
Goldrat supported broad cooperation between Agudat Yisrael and Zionist parties, particularly with Mizrachi and Hapoel HaMizrachi. However, in the early 1950s, he led a position closer to Agudat Yisrael's stance, which was sceptical of coalition partnerships with secular parties. He voted in the minority against supporting a secular mayor in the Petah Tikva Municipality, and even resigned from the municipal committee when his opinion was not accepted.

Goldrat stated in the Knesset that he supported the death penalty, but he refused to vote against its abolition as long as the state's laws were not in accordance with Torah law.
