= Ya'akov Gil =

Ya'akov Gil may refer to:

- Ya'akov Gil (politician born 1908), Israeli rabbi and politician who served as a member of the Knesset for the General Zionists between 1949 and 1951
- Ya'akov Gil (politician born 1931), Israeli politician who served as a member of the Knesset for the Alignment between 1981 and 1984, and again in 1988
