= Zorach Warhaftig =

Israeli rabbi and politician (1906–2002)

- זרח ורהפטיג
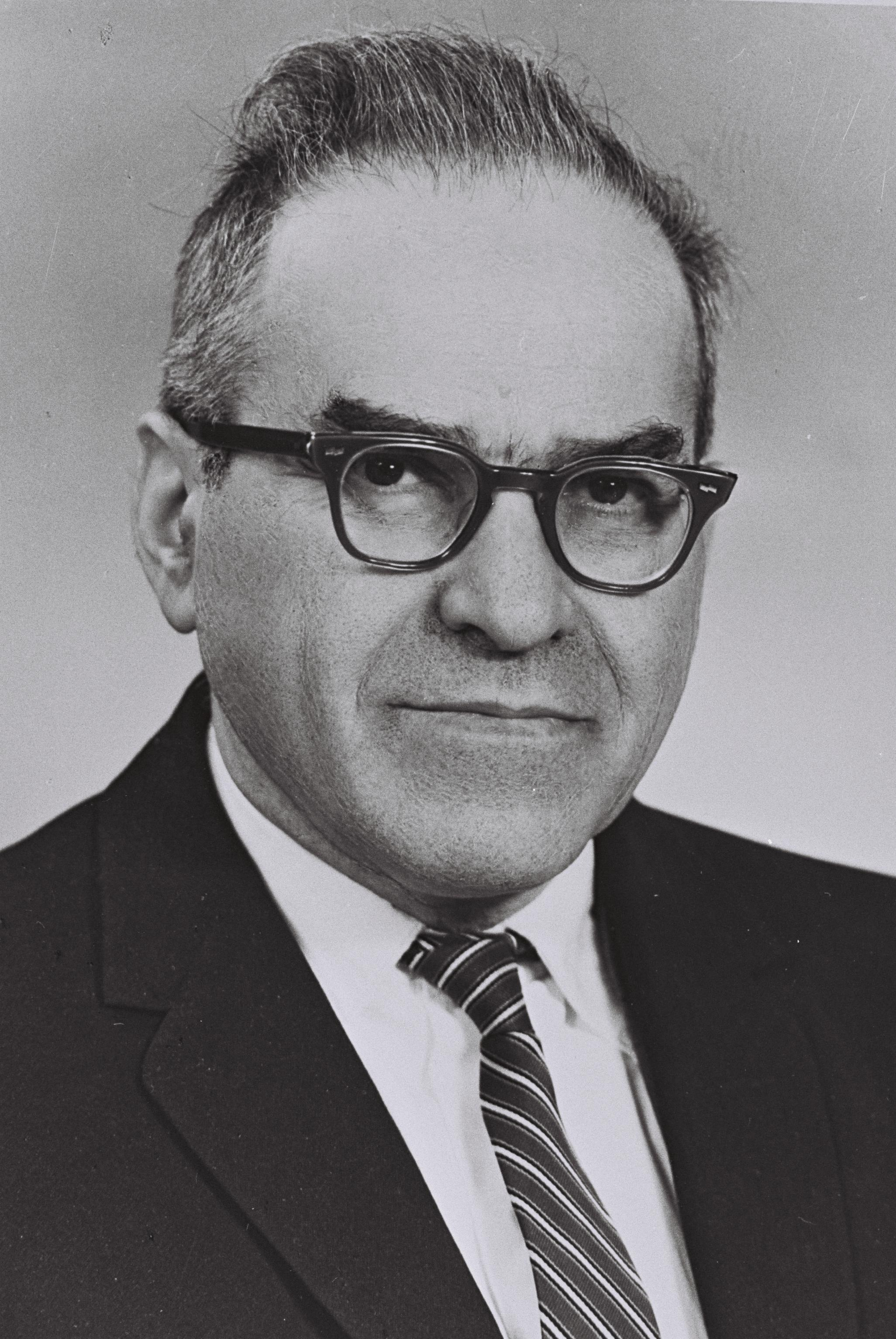

Ministerial roles
- 1961–1974: Minister of Religions

Faction represented in the Knesset
- 1949–1951: United Religious Front
- 1951–1955: Hapoel HaMizrachi
- 1955–1969: National Religious Party
- 1974–1981: National Religious Party

Personal details
- Born: 2 February 1906 Volkovysk, Russian Empire
- Died: 26 September 2002 (aged 96)
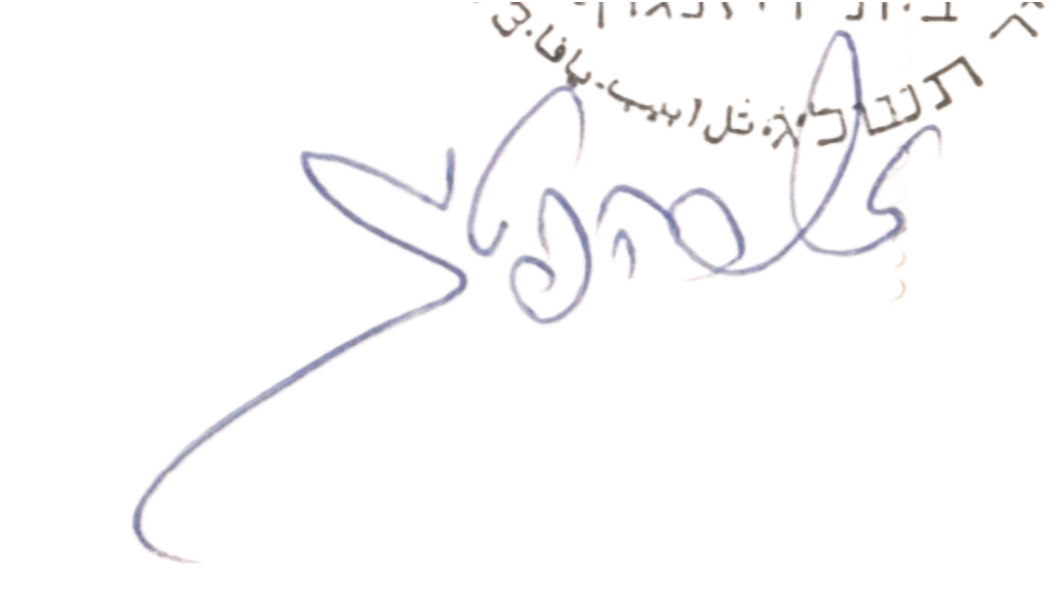
- Signature

Zorach Warhaftig (Yiddish: זורח ורהפטיג; Hebrew: זרח ורהפטיג; 2 February 1906 – 26 September 2002), also spelled Zorah or Zerach, was an Israeli rabbi, lawyer, and politician. He was a signatory of Israel's Declaration of Independence. In 1940, he was one of the people who influenced the Japanese diplomat Chiune Sugihara to issue life-saving transit visas, and later he became one of the first members of Israel's Knesset and the author of the country's Law of Return.

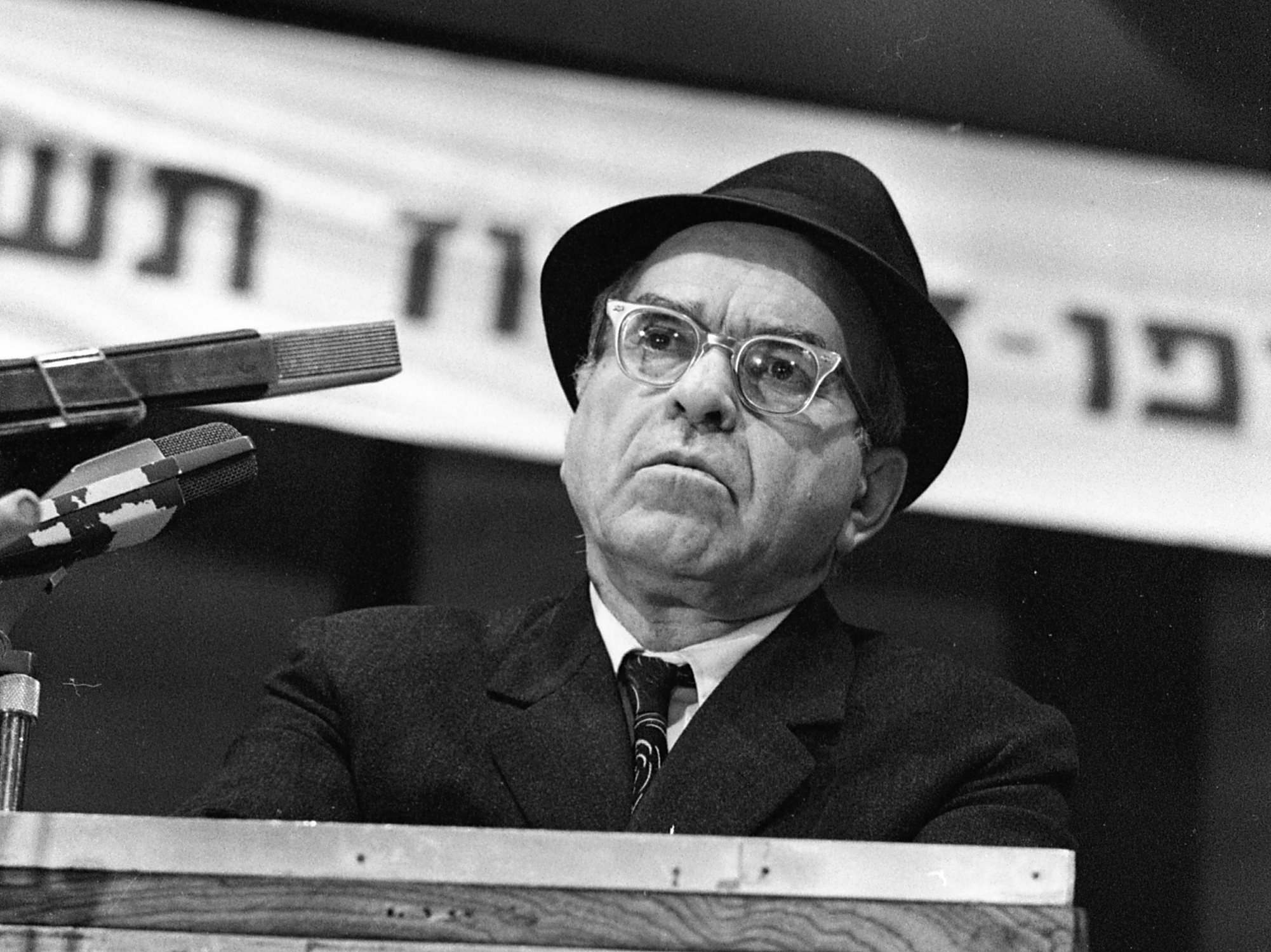
Warhaftig in 1973

== Early life and education ==
Zorach Warhaftig was born in Volkovysk, in the Russian Empire (today Vawkavysk, Belarus) in 1906. His parents were Yerucham Warhaftig and Rivka Fainstein. He studied law at the University of Warsaw, and later became a Doctor of Law from the Hebrew University.

== Second World War ==
At the start of World War II, Nathan Gutwirth and Rabbi Warhaftig were among those who convinced the Japanese Vice-Consul in Kaunas, Lithuania, Chiune Sugihara, to issue transit visas for the entire Mir Yeshiva. Warhaftig and most students of the Mir Yeshiva received a Sugihara visa (Note: Also called a "Curaçao visa") from the Dutch consul Jan Zwartendijk to Lithuania, which may have been authorized by Dutch ambassador L. P. J. de Decker in Riga, Latvia. It was de Decker who altered the official "visa" wording for a few Jews, omitting in the text the need for the Curaçao governor approving entry. The "visa" gave Warhaftig, the students and some others like Nathan Gutwirth an official travel destination which allowed Sugihara to issue Japanese transit visas.

By so doing, De Decker, Zwartendijk and Sugihara saved thousands of lives and families from the Nazis who had occupied first Poland and then Lithuania. In 1940 Warhaftig and his family travelled east from Lithuania to Japan. On 5 June 1941 the Warhaftigs left Yokohama on the Japanese ocean liner Hikawa Maru and on 17 June they landed at Vancouver, Canada. He described the trip as "a summer vacation and with the war seeming to be so far away" although, he said, "I didn't have a peaceful mind because of the strong responsibility I had to help the Jewish refugees with the troubles they faced."

== Palestine (1947) and Israel ==
In 1947, Warhaftig immigrated to Mandatory Palestine. Initially he joined the Hapoel HaMizrachi party, a religious-zionist party, and in 1949 he was elected to the first Knesset as part of the United Religious Front, an alliance between Mizrachi, Hapoel HaMizrachi, Agudat Yisrael and Poalei Agudat Yisrael. In 1948-1963 he taught Jewish Law at the Hebrew University of Jerusalem.

The party contended in the 1951 elections alone. Although it won only two seats, it was included in David Ben-Gurion's coalition, and Warhaftig was appointed Deputy Minister of Religions in the fourth government. In 1956, Hapoel HaMizrachi and Mizrachi merged to form the National Religious Party. Warhaftig led the party and retained his ministerial role until the end of the third Knesset.

After the 1961 elections (the fifth Knesset) he was appointed Minister of Religions, a position he held until 1974. In 1981 he retired from the Knesset.

In 1970, he was elected chairman of the curatorium of Bar-Ilan University.

Warhaftig's arguably most important contribution to the Israeli state's character was his part in authoring the Law of Return, which defines, from the State's legal point of view (as opposed to the religious one), who is a Jew.

== Awards and recognition ==
- In 1983 Warhaftig was awarded the Israel Prize, for his special contribution to society and the State of Israel in the advancement of Hebrew law.
- In 1989 he received the Yakir Yerushalayim (Worthy Citizen of Jerusalem) award from the city of Jerusalem.

The Dr. Zerah Warhaftig Institute for Research on Religious Zionism at Bar Ilan University is named for him. In 2010, a street was named after him in Har Homa neighborhood in Jerusalem.

== See also ==
- Members of the first Knesset
- Michael Dennis Rohan
- Chiune Sugihara
- List of Israel Prize recipients

== Published works ==
- “A Constitution for Israel” an article in Yavne Compilation: Political Problems in Israel pgs 17-21, (Hebrew, April 1949)
- “On Rabbinical Judgments in Israel” (collected speeches) (Hebrew, 1956)
- “Legal Issues in the Talmud” (from lectures) (Hebrew, 1957)
- Editor with Shlomo Zeven: “Remembrance: a Torah Collection in Memory of Rabbi Yizhak HaLevi Herzog” (Hebrew, 1962)
- “Chattel in Jewish Law” (Hebrew, 1964)
- “Problems of State and Religion” (articles and speeches) (Hebrew, 1973)
- Edited: “Religion and State in Legislation: A Collection of Laws and Rulings” (Hebrew, 1973)
- “The Declaration of Independence and Orders for the Order of Government and the Judiciary (1948 and Problems of Religion and State)” in The Book of Shragai (Hebrew, 1982)
- “Refugee and Remnant during the Holocaust” (Hebrew, 1984)
- “Researches in Jewish Law” (Hebrew, 1985)
- “A Constitution for Israel – Religion and State” (Hebrew, 1988)
- Warhaftig, Zorach (1988). Refugee and Survivor: Rescue Attempts during the Holocaust. Jerusalem: Yad Vashem. ISBN 9789653080058.
