= Moshe Kelmer =

Israeli politician (1901–1970)

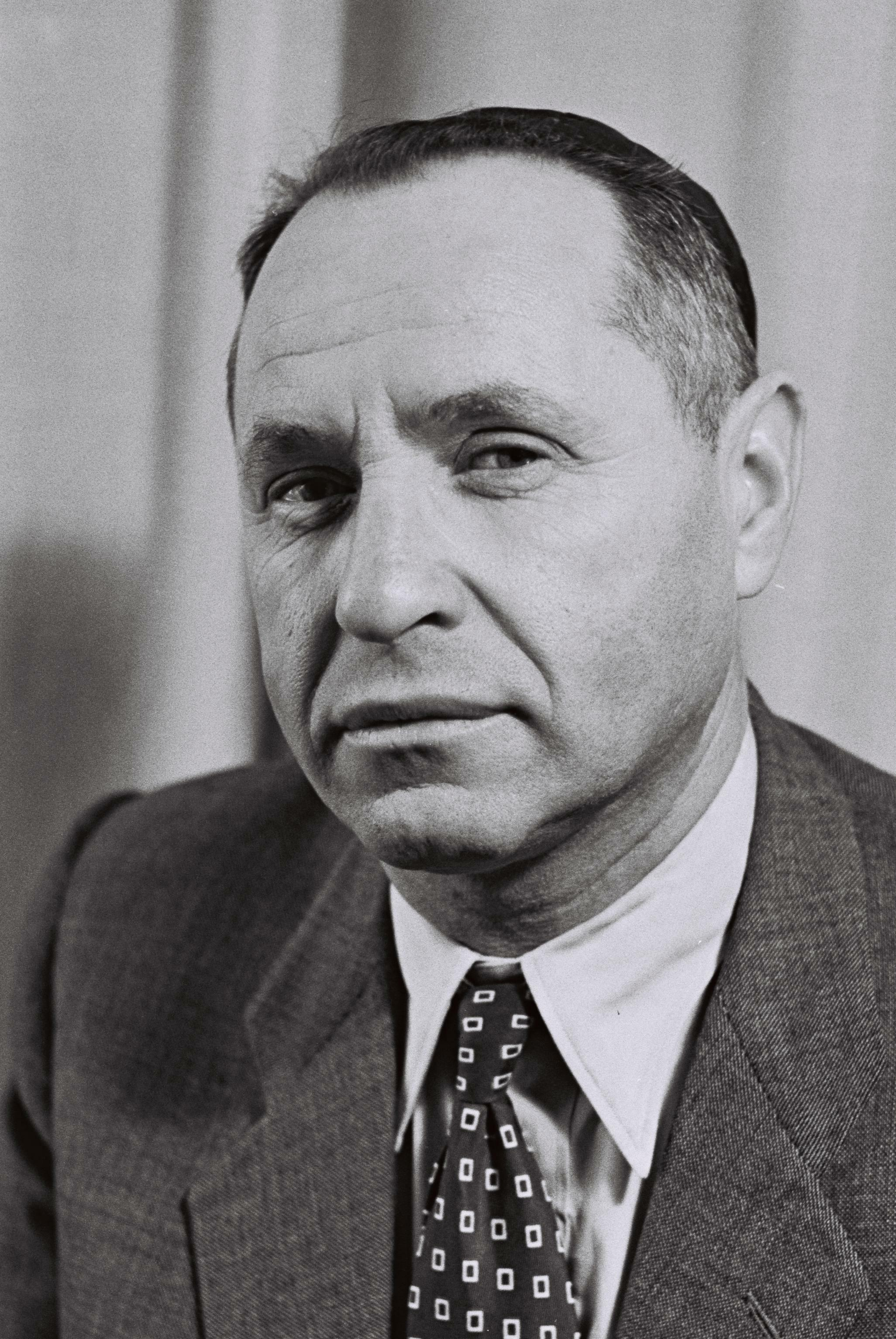
- Kelmer in 1951

Faction represented in the Knesset
- 1949: United Religious Front
- 1951–1955: Hapoel HaMizrachi
- 1955–1959: National Religious Party
- 1963–1965: National Religious Party

Personal details
- Born: 1 November 1901; Żychlin, Russian Empire
- Died: 11 September 1970 (aged 68)

Moshe Kelmer (Hebrew: משה קלמר; 1 November 1901 – 11 September 1970) was an Israeli politician who served as a member of the Knesset in three spells between 1949 and 1963.

== Biography ==
Born in Żychlin in the Russian Empire (today in Poland), Kelmer joined Young Mizrachi during his youth. He emigrated to Mandatory Palestine in 1921, and was amongst the founders of Hapoel HaMizrachi the following year. He later helped establish two of the movement's construction companies, HaBona in 1937 and Mishkanot in 1938, serving as chairman of the board at both. He also helped found the Adanim Mortgage Bank and chaired its board of directors.

Kelmer attended a religious teachers' seminary in Jerusalem, and graduated from the Hebrew University's law faculty.

In the elections for the first Knesset in 1949, Kelmer won a seat on the United Religious Front list, an alliance of the four main religious parties. However, he resigned from the Knesset on 11 March 1949, less than a month after entering it, and was replaced by Eliyahu Mazur. He returned to the Knesset following the 1951 elections, in which Hapoel HaMizrachi ran as an independent party. He retained his seat in the 1955 elections, in which the party ran as the National Religious Party together with Mizrachi.

He lost his seat in the 1959 elections, and also failed to be elected in 1961. However, he returned to the Knesset on 2 April 1963 as a replacement for the deceased Aharon-Ya'akov Greenberg. He lost his seat again in the 1965 elections, and died five years later.
