= Avrohom Genachowsky =

Israeli rabbi (1936–2012)

Rabbi Avrohom Genachowsky
- אברהם גנחובסקי

Personal life
- Born: September 1936
- Died: October 11, 2012 (aged 76)
- Spouse: Esther
- Parents: Eliyahu Moshe (father); Gitta (mother)

Religious life
- Religion: Judaism

Jewish leader
- Yahrtzeit: 25 Tishrei, 5773

Avrohom Genachowsky (Hebrew: אברהם גנחובסקי; also spelled Avraham Genechovsky or Genichovsky; September 1936 – October 11, 2012), was an Orthodox Jewish rabbi and talmudic scholar. He served as dean ("rosh yeshiva") at Yeshivas Tchebin in Jerusalem.

== Biography ==
He was born in Tel Aviv on the first day of Rosh Hashanah, 1936, to Rabbi Eliyahu Moshe and Gitta. Eliyahu Moshe studied at the Lomza Yeshiva, and later served as one of the early religious members of the Knesset for HaPoel HaMizrahi.

When Eliyahu Moshe published the Talmud, Rabbi Avrohom Yeshaya Karelitz gave him permission to include his commentaries on the condition that they would be organized by Avrohom, who was 17 at the time.

Avrohom studied for a short time in Ponevezh Yeshiva, and afterward in Slabodka Yeshiva. He was fluent in the areas of Choshen Mishpat and Even Ha'ezer. At his father's request, he took the Chief Rabbinate of Israel's test on Choshen Mishpat and earned a mark of 100.

He married Rebbetzin Esther, daughter of Rabbi Refoel Yonah and Baila Bronfeld. Esther was the step-granddaughter of Rabbi Dov Berish Weidenfeld of Chebin (Trzebinia) (Rabbi Refoel Yonah was the son of Rabbi Yosef and Rebbetzin Sarah Bronfeld. After the death of Rabbi Yosef, Sarah married Rabbi Weidenfeld). Rabbi Weidenfeld hired him to teach at his yeshiva, where he remained until his death.

Esther allowed him to remain in Jerusalem all week, returning to home only for Shabbat and holidays.

== Works ==
His first sefer was Cheder Horasi (Hebrew: חדר הורתי) on Horayot, which he wrote in memory of his mother. His students also published some of his chidushim under the title B'nei Re'eim (Hebrew: בני ראם).

== Final illness and death ==
During his final several months, he suffered from pancreatic cancer. He died, aged 76, on October 11, 2012 at 3:00 AM at Shaare Zedek Medical Center in Jerusalem. 30,000 people attended his funeral.
