= Yehuda Leib Maimon =

Israeli politician (1875–1962)

- יהודה לייב מימון
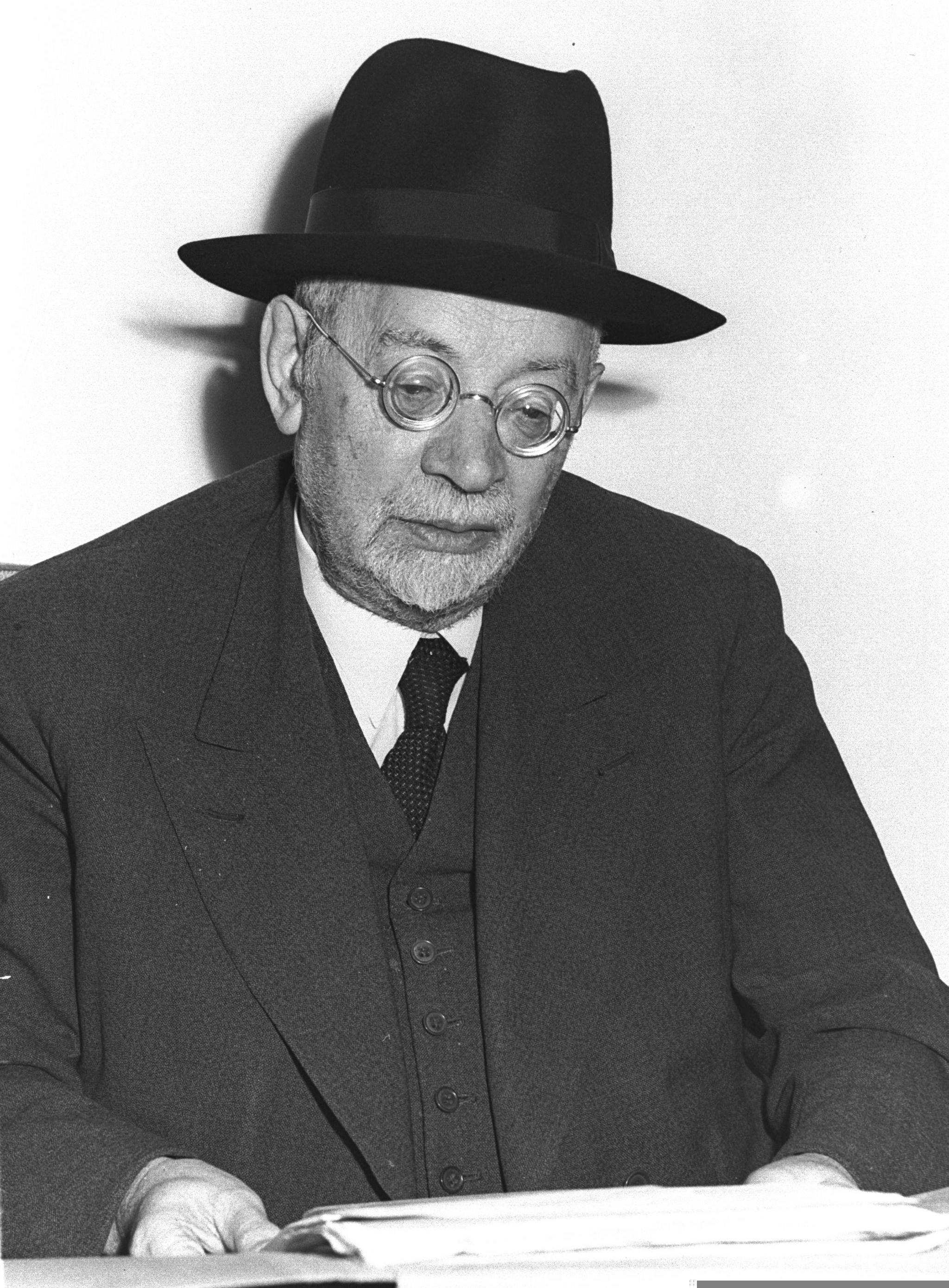

Ministerial roles
- 1948–1951: Minister of Religions
- 1948–1951: Minister of War Victims

Faction represented in the Knesset
- 1949–1951: United Religious Front

Personal details
- Born: 1 January 1875 Mărculești, Russian Empire
- Died: 10 July 1962 (aged 87)
- Relations: Ada Maimon (Sister); Nina Brosh (great-granddaughter)

Yehuda Leib Maimon (Hebrew: יהודה לייב מימון; 1 January 1875 – 10 July 1962, also known as Yehuda Leib HaCohen Maimon) was an Israeli rabbi, politician and leader of the Religious Zionist movement. He was Israel's first Minister of Religion.

== Biography ==
Yehuda Leib Fishman (later Maimon) was born in Mărculești, in the Soroksky Uyezd of the Bessarabia Governorate (then part of the Russian Empire, now in Moldova). Maimon studied in a number of yeshivot and received rabbinic ordination from Rabbi Yechiel Michel Epstein, the author of the Aruch HaShulchan. He was one of the founders of the Mizrachi movement in 1902. By this time Maimon had moved to the Russian Empire, where he was arrested several times for Zionist activity. He was a delegate to the ninth Zionist Congress in 1909, and attended every one until Israeli independence in 1948.

In 1913, Maimon immigrated to Palestine (then part of the Ottoman Empire), but was expelled during World War I. He moved to the United States, where he organised the Mizrachi movement.

He returned to Palestine in 1919. There, he was one of the founders of the Chief Rabbinate of Israel. In 1939 he participated in the St James's Palace Conference representing the Jews in Mandatory Palestine. In 1946 Maimon was arrested by the British during Operation Agatha. He was Elected to the Committee of Five that edited the final format of the Declaration of Independence and was one of its signers. In Israel he served as a member of The Knesset, Minister of Religions and Minister of Victims of War.

He died in 1962 in Assuta hospital in Tel Aviv.

His sister Ada also served as a member of the Knesset for Mapai. One of his great-granddaughters is the model Nina Brosh.

== Political career ==
After returning to Mandate Palestine (now under British control) in 1919, Maimon became leader of Mizrachi in the country and together with Abraham Isaac Kook he helped establish the Chief Rabbinate. He was elected to the board of the Jewish Agency in 1935. In 1936, he founded Mossad Harav Kook, a religious research foundation and notable publishing house named in honor of Rabbi Abraham Isaac Kook.

Maimon helped draft Israel's Declaration of Independence and was one of its signers. He was appointed Minister of Religions and Minister of War Victims in the provisional government established immediately after independence. He was elected to the first Knesset in 1949 as a member of the United Religious Front (an alliance of Agudat Yisrael, Poalei Agudat Yisrael, Mizrachi and Hapoel HaMizrachi) and retained his ministerial role in the first and second governments. He was the driving force behind a failed effort to reestablish the Sanhedrin. He lost his seat in the 1951 elections.

== Awards and recognition ==
In 1958, he was awarded the Israel Prize for his contribution to Rabbinical literature.

Kfar Maimon in the Negev is named after him

== See also ==
- List of Israel Prize recipients
