= Aharon-Ya'akov Greenberg =

Israeli politician (1900–1963)

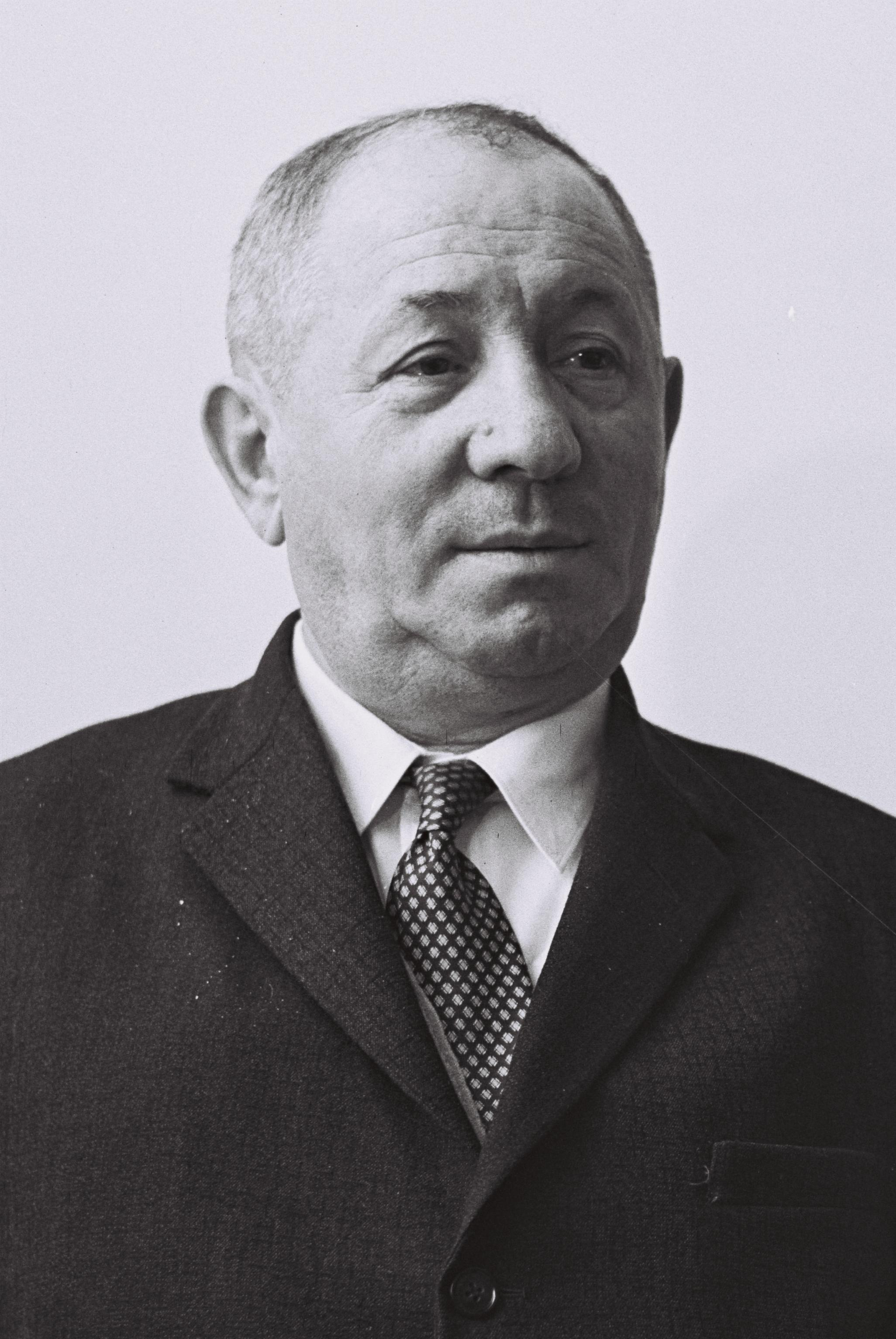
- Greenberg in 1951

Faction represented in the Knesset
- 1949–1951: United Religious Front
- 1955–1963: National Religious Party

Personal details
- Born: 15 March 1900 Sokołów Podlaski, Russian Empire
- Died: 2 April 1963 (aged 63) Israel

Aharon-Ya'akov Greenberg (Hebrew: אהרן-יעקב גרינברג; 15 March 1900 – 2 April 1963) was an Israeli politician who served as a member of the Knesset from 1949 until 1951, and again from 1955 until his death in 1963.

== Biography ==
Born in Sokołów Podlaski in an area of the Russian Empire which is today in Poland, Greenberg was a member of the Religious Zionist Young Mizrachi and Mizrachi Pioneers youth movements.

In 1934 he emigrated to Mandate Palestine, where he became a member of Hapoel HaMizrachi. In 1949, he was elected to the first Knesset on the United Religious Front list (an alliance of the four main religious parties), but lost his seat in the 1951 elections. He returned to the Knesset after the 1955 elections, by which time Hapoel HaMizrachi had formed the National Religious Party together with Mizrachi, and was appointed Deputy Speaker. He remained a member of the Knesset and Deputy Speaker until his death in 1963, when he was replaced by Moshe Kelmer.

He is perhaps best remembered in Orthodox Jewish circles for his authorship of "Iturei Torah" (עיטורי תורה), a commentary upon the weekly Torah portion, drawing from wide-ranging sources from Hassidus to Mussar, which he published weekly in the newspaper HaTzofe under the pseudonym "Y. Halevi". After his death, these columns were collected and published in book form in seven volumes by Yavneh Publications of Tel Aviv.
