= Haim-Moshe Shapira =

Israeli politician (1902–1970)

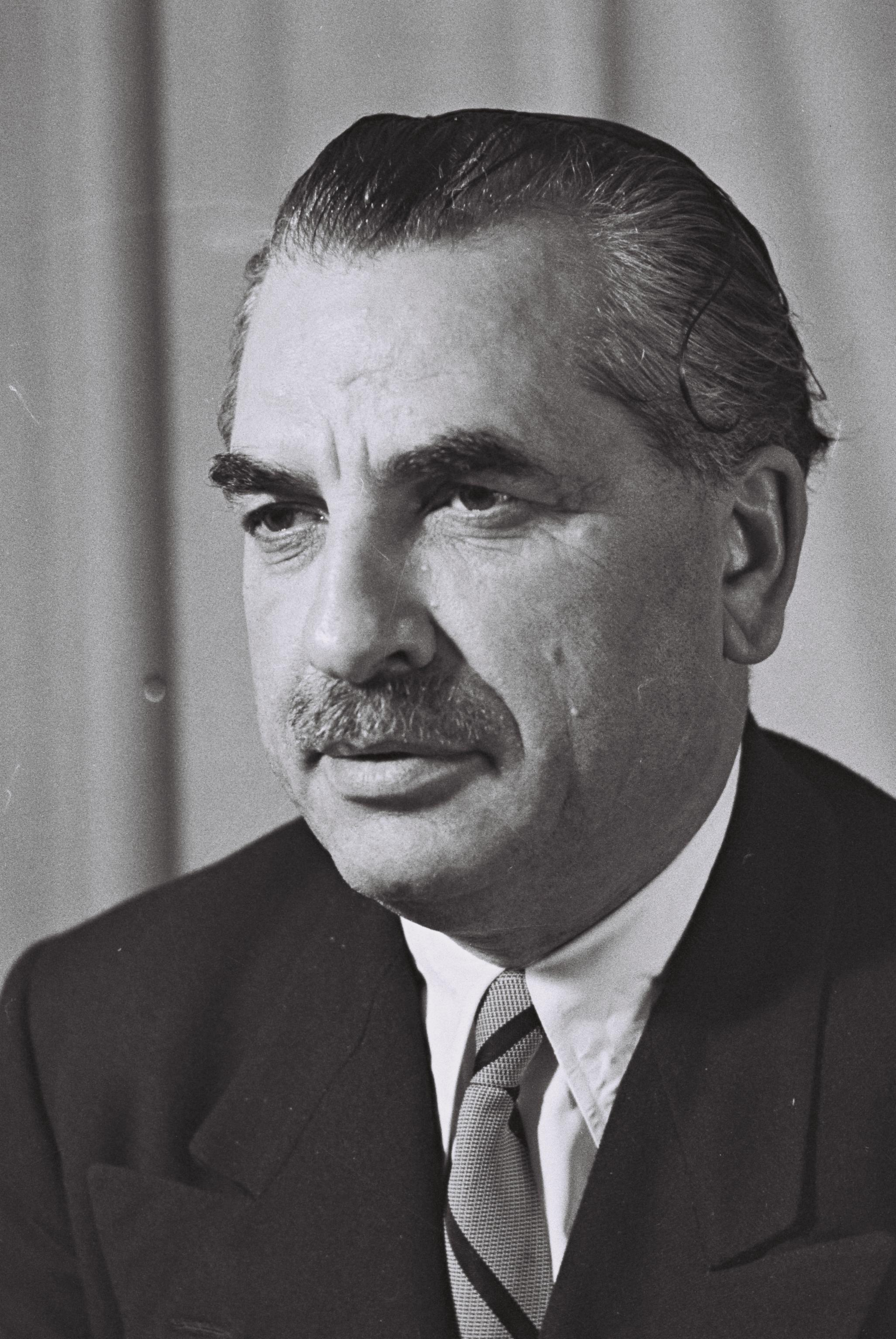
- Shapira in 1951

Ministerial roles
- 1948–1951: Minister of Health
- 1948–1951: Minister of Immigration
- 1949–1952: Minister of Internal Affairs
- 1951–1958: Minister of Religions
- 1952–1958: Minister of Welfare
- 1955: Minister of Internal Affairs
- 1959–1970: Minister of Internal Affairs
- 1961–1966: Minister of Health

Faction represented in the Knesset
- 1949–1951: United Religious Front
- 1951–1955: Hapoel HaMizrachi
- 1955–1970: National Religious Party

Personal details
- Born: 26 March 1902 Horadnia, Russian Empire
- Died: 16 July 1970 (aged 68)

Haim-Moshe Shapira (Hebrew: חיים משה שפירא; 26 March 1902 – 16 July 1970) was a key Israeli politician in the early days of the state's existence. A signatory of Israel's declaration of independence, he served continuously as a minister from the country's foundation in 1948 until his death in 1970 apart from a brief spell in the late 1950s.

== Biography ==
Haim-Moshe Shapira was born to Zalman Shapira and Rosa Krupnik in the Russian Empire in Grodno in what is today Belarus. He was educated in heder and a yeshiva, where he organised a youth group called Bnei Zion (Sons of Zion). He worked in the Education and Culture department of the National Jewish Council in Kaunas (now in Lithuania), and in 1919 set up the Young Mizrachi, which became a leading player in the religious Zionist youth movement in Lithuania. In 1922 he started work as a teacher at an ultra-orthodox school in Vilnius, and also served on the board of the Mizrachi group in the city. Between 1923 and 1924 he was active in the Young Mizrachi group in Warsaw, before attending a Rabbinical Seminary in Berlin between 1924 and 1925.

In 1925 he was a delegate at the Zionist Congress, where he was elected onto the executive committee. In the same year he immigrated to Mandatory Palestine. In 1928 he was elected onto the Central Committee of the Hapoel HaMizrachi movement, and also served as a member of the World Mizrachi committee.

In 1936 he was elected as a member of the Zionist Directorate and became a director of the Aliyah department of the Jewish Agency, a role he filled until 1948. In 1938 he was sent on a special mission to try to save Jews in Austria following the takeover by Nazi Germany.

== Political career ==
Shapira was one of the people to sign Israel's declaration of independence, and was immediately appointed Minister of Health and Minister of Immigration in David Ben-Gurion's provisional government. According to a February 26, 2026 Haaretz investigation, in a governmental cabinet discussion Minister Moshe Haim Shapira stated that Israeli fighters’ violence toward Arabs had become a “plague.”

In Israel's first elections in 1949, Shapira won a seat as a member of the United Religious Front bloc, an alliance of Agudat Yisrael, Poalei Agudat Yisrael, Mizrachi and his Hapoel HaMizrachi party. He was reappointed to his previous ministerial posts, and also became Minister of Internal Affairs.

After the 1951 elections in which Hapoel HaMizrachi ran as an independent party, Shapira was appointed Minister of Internal Affairs and Minister of Religions. Following a cabinet reshuffle in 1952, he lost the Internal Affairs portfolio, but was appointed Minister of Welfare instead. Another reshuffle in 1955 saw him regain the Internal Affairs portfolio.

The 1955 elections saw Mizrachi and Hapoel HaMizrachi run as a combined bloc, the National Religious Front, which later became the National Religious Party (NRP). Shapira was reappointed Minister of Religions and Minister of Welfare. In 1957 he was seriously injured by a hand grenade thrown into the Knesset by Moshe Dwek, but survived. He and all other NRP ministers resigned from the cabinet in July 1958, marking the only spell he spent out of office during his time in Israel.

Following the 1959 elections, Shapira returned to the cabinet as Minister of Internal Affairs. After the early elections in 1961, he re-added the health portfolio to his roles.

After elections in 1965 Shapira became just Internal Affairs Minister, a role he retained again after the 1969 elections. He died in office on 16 July 1970.

=== Positions on the Arab–Israeli conflict ===
Shapira belonged to the dovish camp of religious Zionism. This camp held considerable power before the Six-Day War, but was weakened significantly after the war in favor of hawkish Gush Emunim, whose spiritual leader was Rabbi Zvi Yehuda Kook.

Before the state of Israel was founded, Shapira opposed the dissident military organizations, Irgun and the Stern Gang, although he resigned in response to the attack on the Irgun arms ship Altalena, ordered by David Ben-Gurion.

Before the United Nations voted in favor of the United Nations Partition Plan for Palestine, Shapira took a minority position in his movement, supporting the plan. When military actions were debated during the 1948 Arab–Israeli War, Shapira voiced moderate and careful positions. After the state was founded, he supported giving a hundred thousand Palestinian refugees the option to return to Israel in exchange for a peace accord.

Regarding the Deir Yassin and Qibya affairs, he said, "It's wrong from a Jewish perspective. Jews should not act like that". His opinion differed from others in his party, including Zalman Shragai.

Shapira supported retreat from the Sinai Peninsula after the 1956 Suez Crisis. He said: "A bit more modesty, a bit less vanity and pride won't be unhelpful to us". In this context, he cited the decision of Rabbi Yochanan ben Zakai to negotiate with the Romans.

Shapira was the most vocal of the ministers opposing a pre-emptive Israeli attack before the Six Day War. "How dare you go to war when all the circumstances are against us", he said to the IDF's chief of staff, Yitzhak Rabin. The other National Religious Party ministers joined Shapira in this stance. During the war, he opposed opening a new front in the Golan Heights. Despite his moderate worldview, he acted to include the right wing parties in the government on the eve of the war. This effort resulted in the establishment of a national unity government.

After the war, Shapira voiced support for the settlement movement but warned that future peace agreements would be based on territorial concessions. However, he believed that discussions were meaningless as long as the Arabs refused to consider peace with Israel. He was more determined about Jerusalem – "The eternal capital should not be taken from the eternal nation".

When the pupils of Rabbi Zvi Yehuda Kook expressed indignation at his moderate worldview, he replied, "we should not distance ourselves from our few friends in the world". He cited the opinion of Rabbi Joseph B. Soloveitchik, who said that questions of territorial concessions should be decided by those who are experts in the fields of defense and national security.

When Moshe Dayan demanded the annexation of the West Bank to Israel, Shapira opposed it. Dayan wondered, "How can a religious Jew be so yielding". He remarked that Shapira's opinion differed from that of other party members.

== Injury ==
On 29 October 1957 Moshe Dwek, a 26 year old disgruntled citizen, entered the main hall of the Knesset and threw a hand grenade towards the seats of the government ministers, wounding Shapira, Prime Minister David Ben-Gurion, Foreign Minister Golda Meir and Transportation Minister Moshe Carmel. Dwek claimed the Jewish Agency had not helped him sufficiently. Ben-Gurion was wounded in his hands and foot by shrapnel, Carmel suffered a broken arm, Meir was treated for minor injuries. However, Shapiro was more seriously injured and had to undergo several operations to remove shrapnel from his stomach and head. In September 1958, on the day before Yom Kippur, Dwek sent Shapira a letter of apology. Shapiro accepted the apology.
