= United Religious Front =

United Religious Front חזית דתית מאוחדת
- Founded: 1949
- Dissolved: 1951 (nationally)
- Ideology: Ultra-Orthodox interest
- Alliance of: Agudat Yisrael, Hapoel HaMizrachi, Mizrachi, Poalei Agudat Yisrael and the Union of Religious Independents
- Most MKs: 16 (1949–1951)
- Fewest MKs: 16 (1949–1951)

Election symbol
- ב בגד (1978 Tel Aviv council election) שגב (1989 Tel Aviv council election)

The United Religious Front (Hebrew: חֲזִית דָּתִית מְאוּחֶדֶת, Hazit Datit Meuhedet) was a political alliance of the four major religious parties in Israel, as well as the Union of Religious Independents, formed to contest the 1949 elections.

== History ==
The idea of a united religious front had been discussed a decade prior between Agudat Yisrael and Mizrachi, although both attempts in 1938 and 1939 were aborted. The formal URF was formed as an alliance of all four major religious parties (Mizrachi, Hapoel HaMizrachi, Agudat Yisrael and Poalei Agudat Yisrael), the former two being Zionist and the latter two being non-Zionist and also viewed as more religiously conservative. One of the demands by the more stringently religious factions before agreeing to form the URF was the exclusion of women from party lists because "the woman's place is in the home." It also included the Union of Religious Independents.

The alliance contested the 1949 election, the first after independence, in which it won 16 seats, making it the third largest in the Knesset. The initial allocation of seats between the parties saw Hapoel HaMizrachi take seven seats, Mizrachi take four, Poalei Agudat Yisrael three and Agudat Yisrael two. The alliance joined David Ben-Gurion's Mapai party in forming the coalition of the first government of Israel, alongside the Progressive Party, Sephardim and Oriental Communities and the Democratic List of Nazareth. There was initially tension concerning matters over separation of religion and state, but the URF decided to initially compromise in order to join the cabinet, in hopes of being "able to fight, through the political institutions of the Jewish State, for the full domination of traditional law in all of Israel, as a maximum objective."

However, the grouping created problems in the governing coalition due to its differing attitudes. Among the many Holocaust survivors emigrating to the new state were some people who had non-Jewish spouses, mothers, children or other family members. Initially, Haim-Moshe Shapira of the URF, who was Minister of Immigration in the cabinet, attempted to declare that non-Jews must first convert before settling. Prime Minister David Ben-Gurion objected and insisted that "If the family goes to the Land of Israel, they will be in a Jewish environment, and the children will be Jewish children, and I don't care if the father or mother is in origin of a different race." Ben-Gurion was backed by other ministers such as Bechor-Shalom Sheetrit. Nonetheless, following compromise between the two camps, the Knesset passed a relatively ambiguous aliyah law on 5 July 1950 which satisfied the religious side of the dispute.

On 13 June 1950, the URF abstained from the 50–30 Knesset vote to indefinitely postpone the adoption of a constitution, due in great part to the fact that the ultra-Orthodox factions condemned the idea of a constitution that was not based on the Torah and Talmud. The URF had differing attitudes towards education in the new immigrant camps and the religious education system. It also demanded that Ben-Gurion close the Rationing and Supply Ministry and appoint a businessman as Minister for Trade and Industry. As a result, Ben-Gurion resigned on 15 October 1950. After the differences were resolved, Ben Gurion formed the second government on 1 November 1950, with the United Religious Front retaining their place in the coalition.

In 1951, MP Rabbi Mordechai Nurock of the URF proposed what would later become Holocaust Remembrance Day.

After elections were called for the second Knesset in 1951, the grouping disbanded into its individual parties that fought the election separately. Attempts to form a religious coalition in ensuing years was complicated by disunity and disputation. In 1952, Agudat Yisrael left the coalition government following a dispute over conscription of religious females to the Israel Defense Forces, with the other three parties of the former URF remaining in the fourth Ben-Gurion cabinet.

However, the United Religious Front was retained at the local level, and contested the local elections in Tel Aviv as late as 2003.

== Composition ==
Name	Ideology	Leader	Beginning of the First Knesset	End of the First Knesset
Hapoel HaMizrachi	Religious Zionism; Religious workers interest	Haim-Moshe Shapira	7 / 120	6 / 120
Mizrachi	Religious Zionism	Yehuda Leib Maimon	4 / 120	4 / 120
Poalei Agudat Yisrael	Haredi workers interests	Kalman Kahana	3 / 120	3 / 120
Agudat Yisrael	Torah Judaism; Haredi Judaism	Yitzhak-Meir Levin	2 / 120	3 / 120
Union of Religious Independents	Haredi Judaism	Mordechai Shmuel Carol	0 / 120	0 / 120

== Knesset members ==
Knesset term	Seats	Faction	Members
1st (1949–1951)	7	Hapoel HaMizrachi	Moshe Unna, Yosef Burg, Eliyahu-Moshe Ganhovsky, Aharon-Ya'akov Greenberg, Zerach Warhaftig, Moshe Kelmer (Note: Replaced by Eliyahu Mazur of Agudat Yisrael on 11 March 1949), Haim-Moshe Shapira
1st (1949–1951)	4	Mizrachi	Yehuda Leib Maimon, Mordechai Nurock, David-Zvi Pinkas, Avraham-Haim Shag
1st (1949–1951)	3	Poalei Agudat Yisrael	Avraham-Yehuda Goldrat, Kalman Kahana, Binyamin Mintz
1st (1949–1951)	2	Agudat Yisrael	Meir David Levinstein, Yitzhak-Meir Levin
