= Ya'akov Gil (politician born 1908) =

Israeli politician

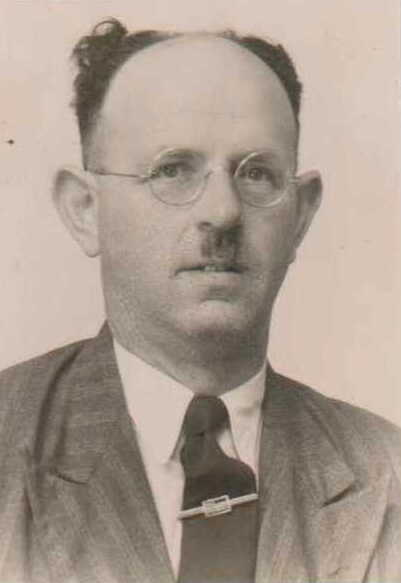

Faction represented in the Knesset
- 1949–1951: General Zionists

Personal details
- Born: 1908 Tiberias, Ottoman Empire
- Died: 22 October 1990 (aged 81–82)

Rabbi Ya'akov Gil (Hebrew: יעקב גיל; 1908 – 22 October 1990) was an Israeli politician who served as a member of the Knesset between 1949 and 1951.

== Biography ==
Born Ya'akov Lipshitz in Tiberias when it was part of the Ottoman Empire, Gil studied in a yeshiva, and was later certified as a rabbi. He worked as a rabbi in Jerusalem. Between 1931 and 1933 he headed the Ohel Yaakov and Degel HaTorah yeshiva and was a member of Tiberius' rabbinical court. From 1933 until 1935 he served as chief rabbi of Nes Tziona.

During World War II he joined the British Army, and served as chief rabbi of the Jewish Brigade. Following the war, he worked with Holocaust survivors in Europe.

Although Gil was a member of the Mizrachi religious Zionism group, he was elected to the first Knesset in 1949 on the General Zionists list. During his first term he was a member of the Committee for Public Services and Labour Committee. However, he lost his seat in the 1951 elections.
