= Eliyahu Mazur =

Polish-Israeli activist and politician

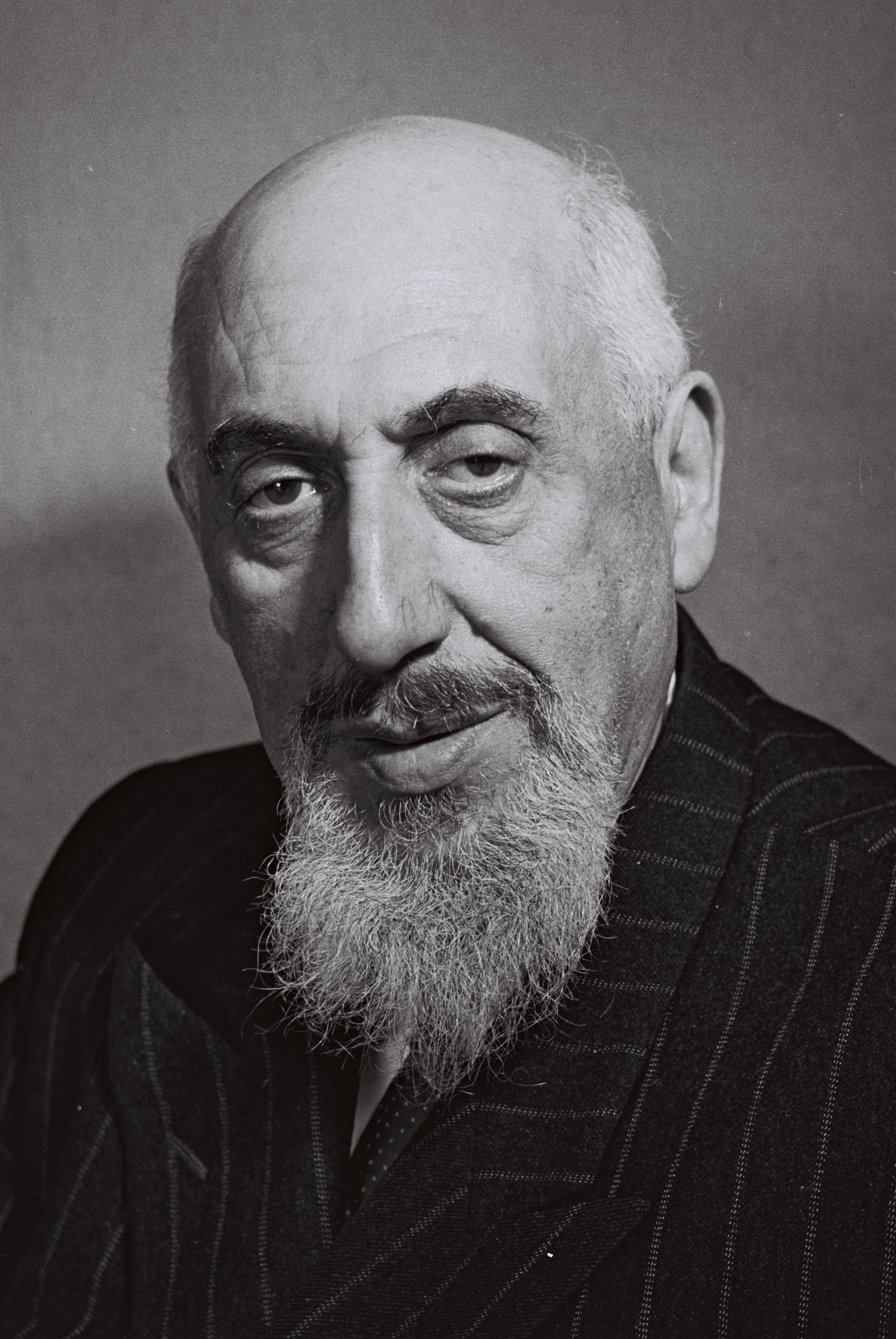
- Mazur in 1956

Faction represented in the Knesset
- 1949–1951: United Religious Front

Personal details
- Born: 1889; Zagórów, Russian Empire
- Died: 24 September 1973

Eliyahu (Eljasz) Mazur (Hebrew: אֵלִיָּהוּ מָזוּר; 1889 – 24 September 1973) was a Polish-Israeli activist and politician.

== Biography ==
Born in Zagórów in the Russian Empire (today in Poland), Mazur received a religious education. He founded a branch of the Mizrachi movement, but later joined Agudat Yisrael, becoming a member of the Polish branch's executive committee, and later a member of the World Agudath Israel committee. In 1929 he became a member of the executive committee of Jewish Merchants, later becoming its president. In 1933 he was elected president of the Warsaw Jewish community, a role he held until 1938. He also served as president of the Wise Men of Lublin yeshiva between 1934 and 1939.

In 1940 he emigrated to Mandatory Palestine, where he established a diamond company in Tel Aviv. He became a member of the executive committees of both the Diamond Association and the Industrialists Association.

He narrowly missed out on a seat in the elections for the first Knesset in 1949, but entered the parliament when Moshe Kelmer resigned on 11 March that year. However, he lost his seat in the 1951 elections.
