= Mordechai Nurock =

Latvian-Israeli politician

- מרדכי נורוק
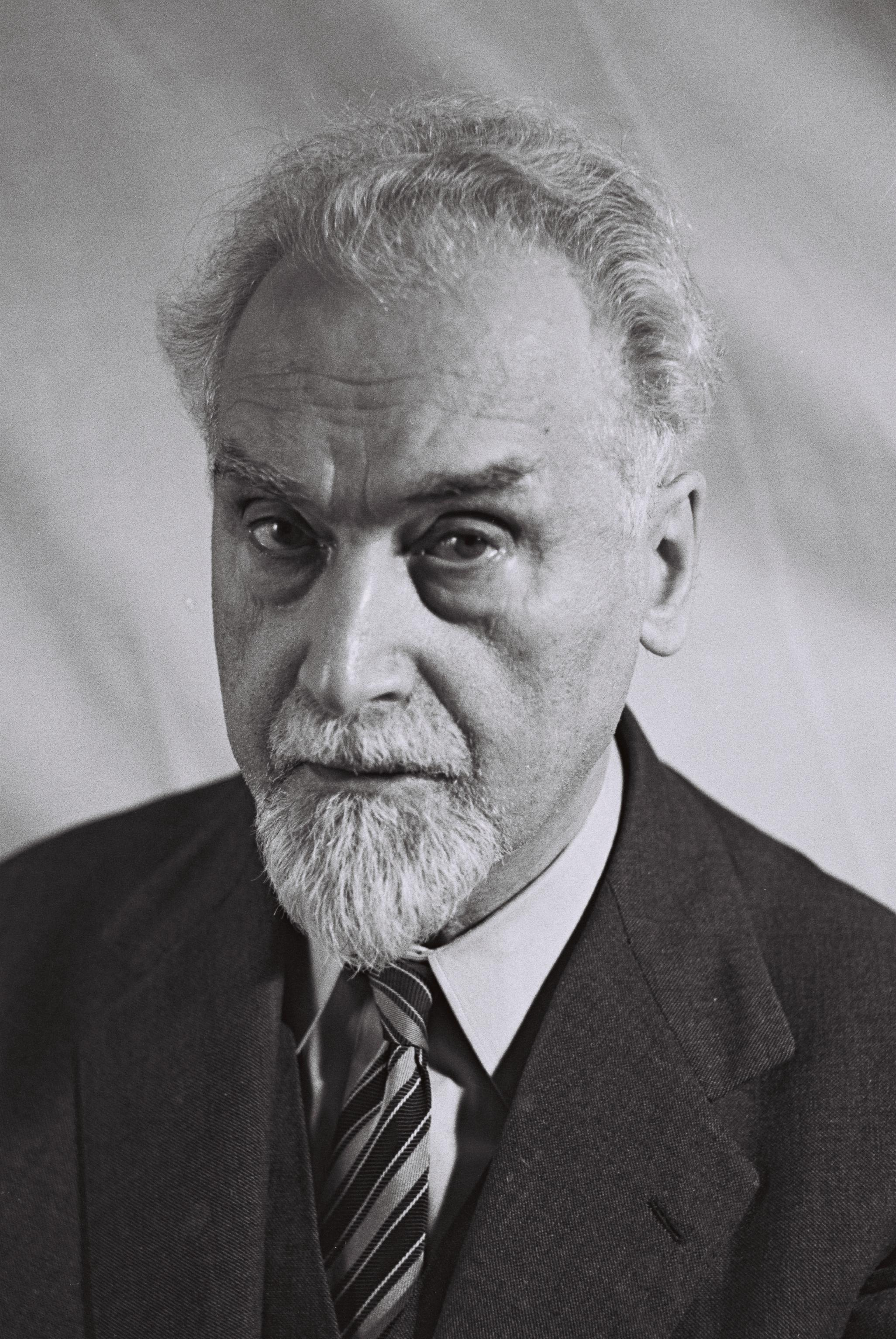
- Nurock in 1951

Ministerial roles
- 1952: Minister of Postal Services

Faction represented in the Knesset
- 1949–1951: United Religious Front
- 1951–1955: Mizrachi
- 1955–1962: National Religious Party

Faction represented in the Saeima
- 1922–1925: Jewish National Bloc
- 1925–1934: Mizrachi

Personal details
- Born: 7 November 1879 Tukums, Russian Empire
- Died: 8 November 1962 (aged 83) Tel Aviv, Israel

Mordechai Nurock (Hebrew: מרדכי נורוק, Latvian: Mordehajs Nuroks, 7 November 1879 – 8 November 1962) was a Latvian-born Israeli who served in both the parliaments of Latvia and Israel. He was also Israel's first Minister of Postal Services, though he only held the post for less than two months.

== Biography ==
Markus Nurock was born in Tukums in the Russian Empire (today in Latvia). His father was the rabbi of Tukums and Jelgava. Nurock studied under his father and was ordained as a rabbi. After finishing high school he attended universities in Russia, Germany and Switzerland, gaining a PhD in philosophy. In 1913, he replaced his father as rabbi of Jelgava, before moving to Russia in 1915.

A Zionist, he was a delegate at the Sixth Zionist Congress in 1903 and helped Jewish refugees during World War I. He also joined the All-Russian Jewish Committee and established a religious Jewish group known as "Tradition and Freedom". In 1921, he returned to Latvia, by then an independent state. The following year he was elected to the Saeima, and became the leader of the minorities' bloc. He retained his seat as a member of the Mizrachi party until the parliament was dissolved in 1934. Following Latvia's occupation by the Soviet Union, he was exiled to Turkmenistan due to his Zionist activities. His wife and two children were killed in the Holocaust, and Nurock emigrated to Mandatory Palestine in 1947.

== Political career ==
After arriving in Palestine, Nurock became involved in politics, joining Mizrachi, and was elected to the first Knesset in 1949 on the United Religious Front list (an alliance of Mizrachi, Hapoel HaMizrachi, Agudat Yisrael and Poalei Agudat Yisrael). Re-elected in 1951, he became the first Minister of Postal Services in David Ben-Gurion's third government on 3 November 1952. The following month, he stood as a candidate in the presidential election, held after the death of Chaim Weizmann. However, he finished second to Mapai's Yitzhak Ben-Zvi. Later in the month the government collapsed and a new government excluding Mizrachi ministers was established on 24 December, resulting in Nurock losing his place in the cabinet.

Nurock was re-elected in 1955 (by which time Mizrachi had merged into the National Religious Party), 1959 and 1961, serving until his death on 8 November 1962. After his death, Nurock was replaced by Shalom-Avraham Shaki.

Streets in Jerusalem, Netanya, Bnei Brak, Herzliya, Ashkelon and Rishon LeZion were named after him.
