= David-Zvi Pinkas =

Israeli politician

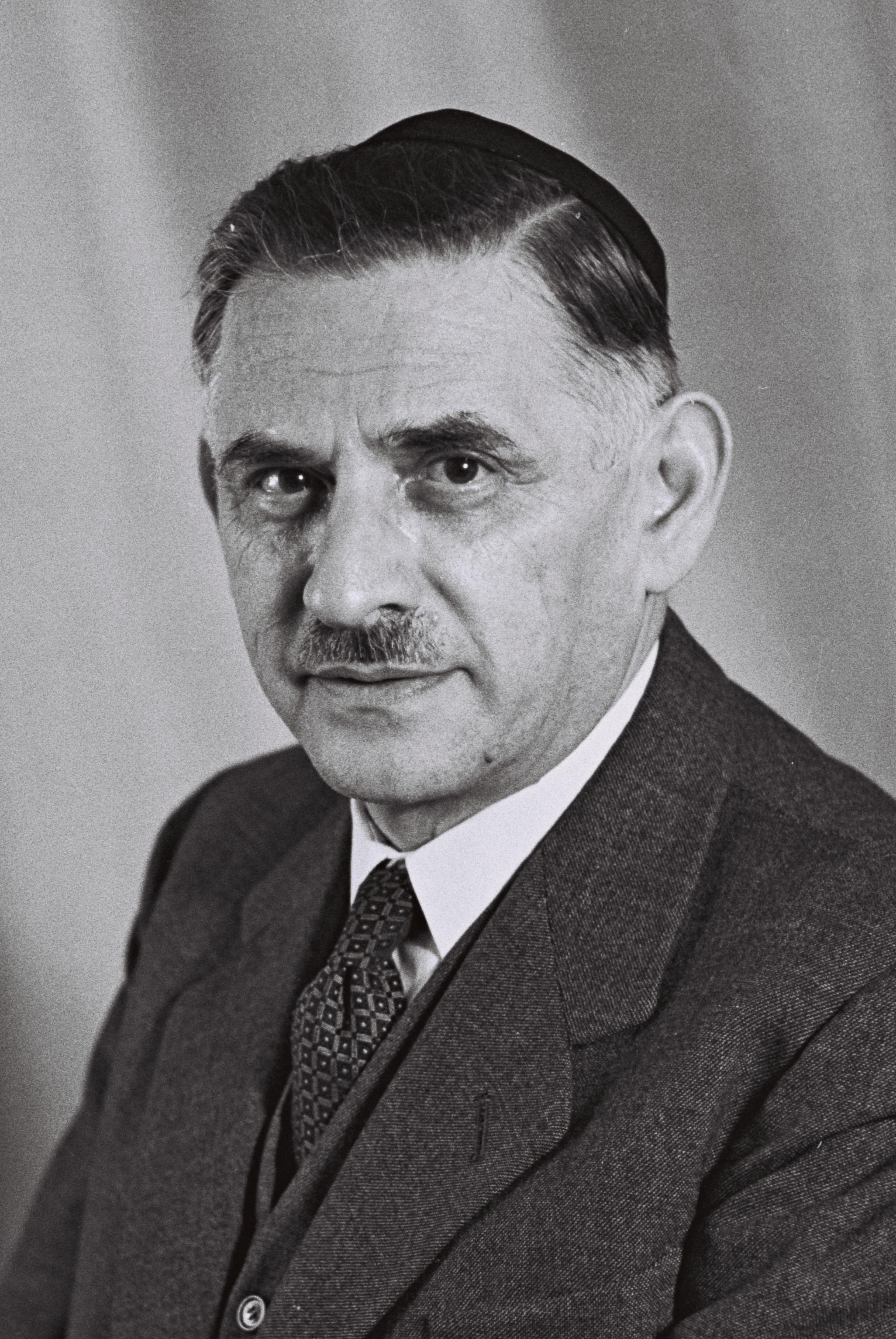
- Pinkas in 1951

Ministerial roles
- 1951–1952: Minister of Transport

Faction represented in the Knesset
- 1949–1951: United Religious Front
- 1951–1952: Mizrachi

Personal details
- Born: 5 December 1895 Sopron, Austria-Hungary
- Died: 14 August 1952 (aged 56)

David-Zvi Pinkas (Hebrew: דָּוִד־צְבִי פִּנְקָס; 5 December 1895 – 14 August 1952) was a Zionist activist and Israeli politician. A signatory of the Israeli declaration of independence, he was the country's third Minister of Transport.

== Biography ==
Born in Sopron in Austria-Hungary (today in Hungary), Pinkas attended high school in Vienna, before studying at a yeshiva in Freiburg and law at the University of Vienna. He was involved in Zionist youth groups, and was one of the leaders of Young Mizrachi in Vienna and one of the founders of the Yeshuran movement.

In 1923 he was a delegate to the thirteenth Zionist congress, and two years later emigrated to Mandate Palestine. He became director of Bank Mizrahi in 1932, the same year in which he was elected to Tel Aviv city council. Three years later he was appointed head of the city's education department.

== Political career ==
In 1944 he became a member of the Assembly of Representatives, and between 1947 and 1948 served as a member of the Jewish National Council's directorate. In 1948 he was one of the people to sign the Israeli declaration of independence. During the subsequent Arab–Israeli War, he was one of the leaders of the security committee.

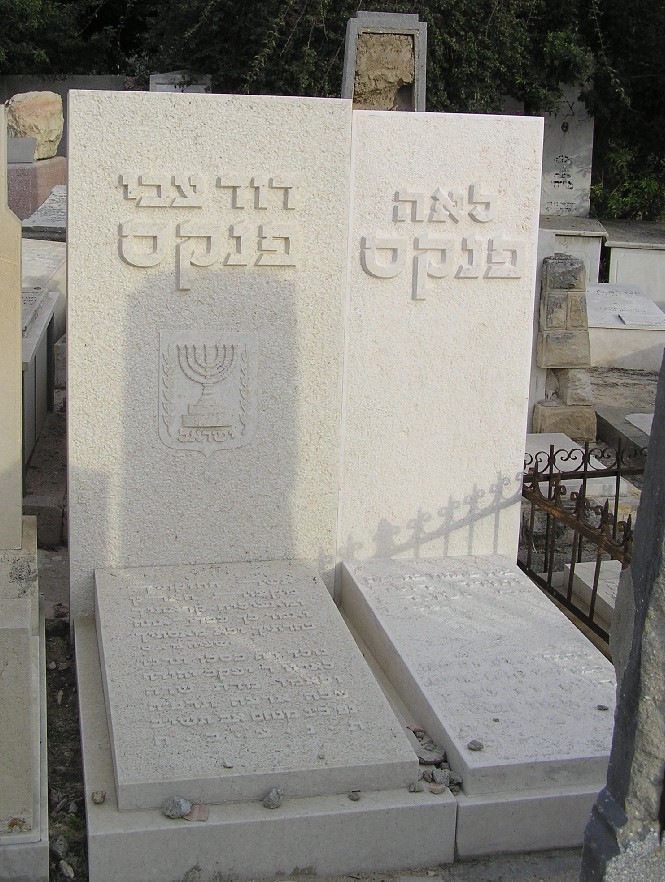
Pinkas' tomb (left, with his wife, Leah, on the right) in Tel Aviv

Following independence, Pinkas assumed membership of the Provisional State Council, and was responsible for drawing up the regulations for the council's committees. In Israel's first elections in 1949 he was elected to the Knesset as a member of the United Religious Front, an alliance of Agudat Yisrael, Poalei Agudat Yisrael, Mizrachi (Pinkas' party) and Hapoel HaMizrachi, and served as chairman of the influential finance committee. In 1950, he was also elected Deputy Mayor of Tel Aviv.

In the 1951 elections Mizrachi ran alone, and Pinkas retained his seat, though the party won only two mandates. He was appointed Minister of Transport, and remained chairman of the finance committee. In his role as Minister of Transport, Pinkas stopped public transport from operating on Shabbat.

== Death ==
In June 1952, a bomb was left on his doorstep by Amos Kenan and Shaltiel Ben Yair. He was not harmed in the assassination attempt but died two months later of a heart attack. He is buried in the Trumpeldor Cemetery in Tel Aviv. Ramat Pinkas was named after him.
