= Avraham-Haim Shag =

Israeli politician (1883–1958)

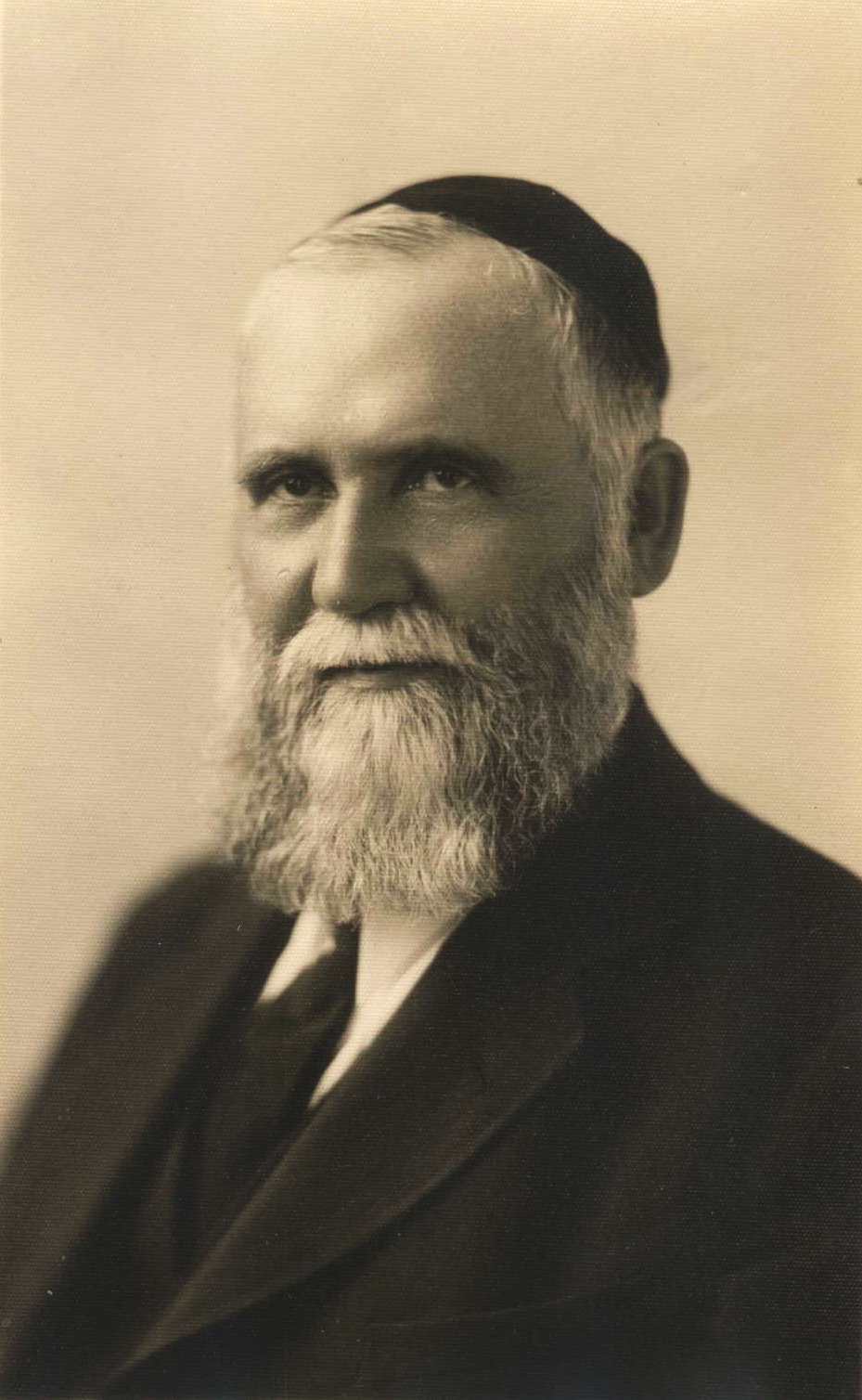
- Shag around 1940

Faction represented in the Knesset
- 1949–1951: United Religious Front

Personal details
- Born: 17 July 1883 Jerusalem, Ottoman Empire
- Died: 6 December 1958 (aged 75)

Avraham-Haim Shag (Hebrew: אברהם-חיים שאג; 17 July 1883 – 6 December 1958) was an Israeli politician who served as a member of the Assembly of Representatives and the Knesset.

== Biography ==
Born Avraham-Haim Zwebner in Jerusalem in the Ottoman Empire, Shag was educated at the Torat Haim yeshiva. He later headed a yeshiva in Jerusalem, and was chairman of the city's religious council in 1936.

He was amongst the founders of Kfar Saba, and also aided the foundation of the Bayit VeGan, Geula and Romema neighborhoods of Jerusalem. In addition, he helped establish the Mizrachi movement in Mandate Palestine, and was a member of its bureau in Jerusalem between 1919 and 1921. He also became a member of the Assembly of Representatives

In 1949 he was elected to the first Knesset on the United Religious Front list, an alliance of the four major religious parties. However, he lost his seat two years later in the 1951 elections. He died in 1958. A street in the Bayit VeGan neighborhood in Jerusalem is named after him.
