= Avraham Taviv =

Israeli politician (1889-1950)

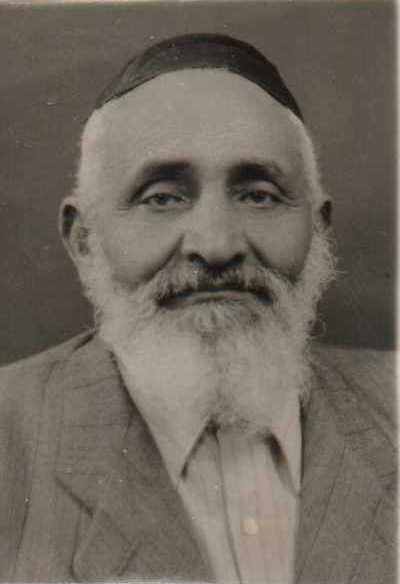
- Taviv during his time in the Knesset

Faction represented in the Knesset
- 1949–1950: Mapai

Personal details
- Born: 1889 Yemen, Ottoman Empire
- Died: 20 April 1950 (aged 60–61)

Avraham Taviv (Hebrew: אברהם טביב; 1889 – 20 April 1950) was an Israeli politician.

== Biography ==
Born in Yemen Vilayet in the Ottoman Empire, Taviv received a religious Jewish education, before working as a jeweller and repairing weapons. He moved to Ottoman-controlled Palestine in 1908 in the first caravan from Yemen. He joined Hapoel Hatzair and later Ahdut HaAvoda. In 1918 he was elected to Rishon LeZion village council. An activist for Yemenite immigrants, he helped establish four Yemenite neighbourhoods in various cities and towns, and was the Yemenite settlements' representative on the Jewish Agency's Aliyah Committee.

In 1920 he attended the founding convention of the Histadrut trade union (and was later elected to its Agricultural Association), and in the same year he was elected to the first Assembly of Representatives. He served on the Jewish National Council until 1931, and again from 1944 until 1948. In 1923 he established the Yemenite Association, which he led until his death. In 1945 he joined Mapai. He was placed 36th on its list for the 1949 Constituent Assembly elections, and was elected as the party won 46 seats. He died on 20 April 1950, and was replaced by Yitzhak Kanav.

Streets in Petah Tikva and Kiryat Ata are named after him.
