= HaTzofe =

Israeli newspaper

- Type: Daily newspaper (until 2007); Weekly newspaper (2007–2008)
- Founded: 1937
- Ceased publication: 2008
- Political alignment: National Religious political right
- Language: Hebrew
- Country: Israel

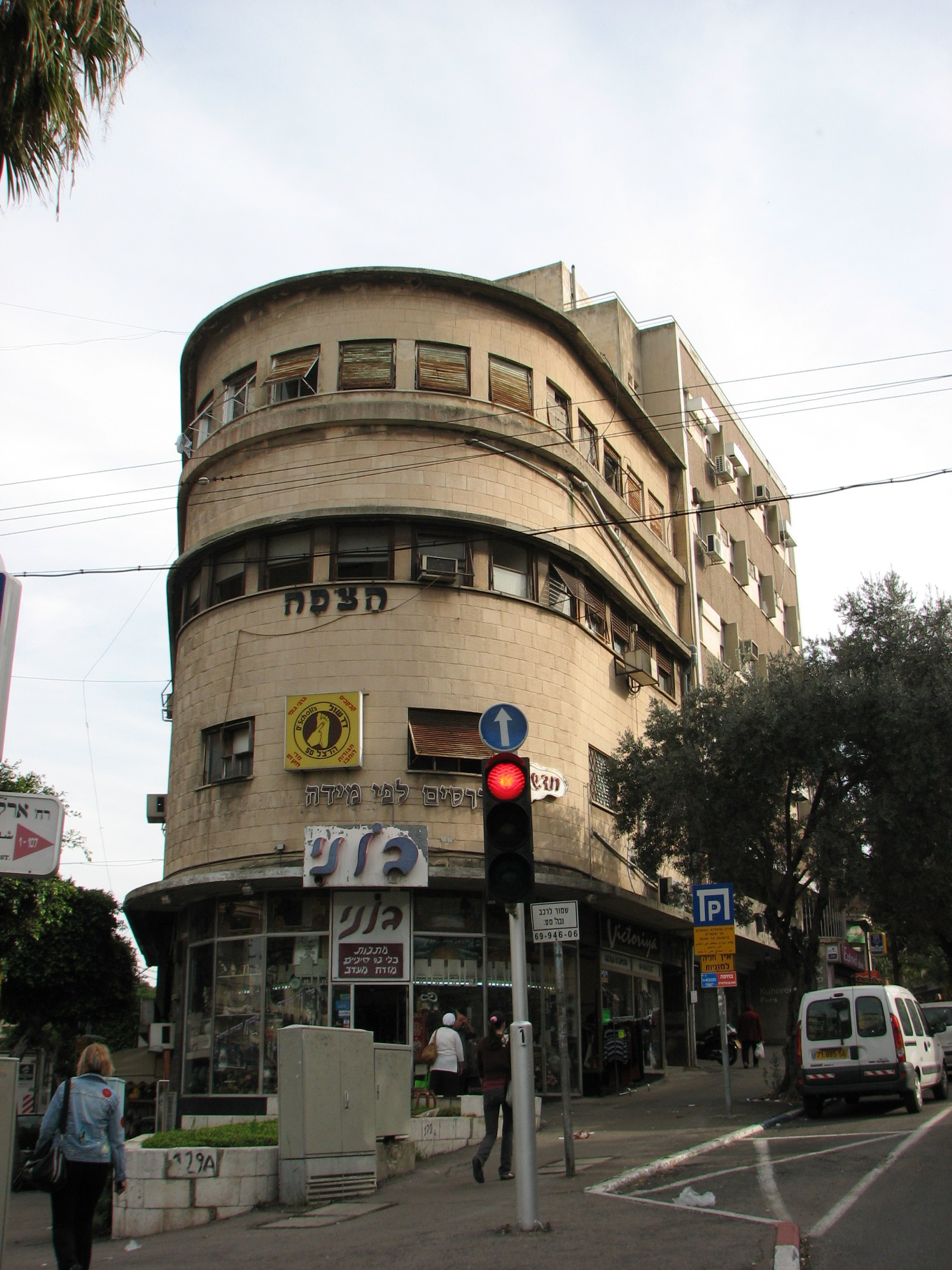
HaTzofe building in Haifa

HaTzofe (Hebrew: הַצֹּפֶה, lit. 'The Observer') was a Hebrew-language daily newspaper published in Israel. In April 2007, it was reduced to weekly publication until its closing over a year later.

According to the paper's website, its point of view is Zionist, nationalist and religious. It claimed to be the only daily newspaper of the Israeli political right, with an emphasis on religious Zionism. The newspaper had been associated in its past to the Mizrachi movement as well as being the beacon of National Religious Party.

In the May 2003, Shlomo Ben-Tzvi purchased the newspaper and in 2004, he purchased the weekly Makor Rishon as well. On 25 April 2007, HaTzofe stopped publishing a daily edition, instead becoming a weekly insert in Makor Rishon which instead began daily operations. It printed its last edition on Friday, 26 December 2008.

== See also ==
- List of newspapers in Israel
