= Hapoel HaMizrachi =

Hapoel HaMizrachi הפועל המזרחי
- Leader: Haim-Moshe Shapira
- Founded: 1922
- Dissolved: 1956
- Merged into: National Religious Party
- Ideology: Religious Zionism; Religious workers interests
- Alliances: United Religious Front (1949–1951); National Religious Front (1955–1956)
- Most MKs: 9 (1955–1956)
- Fewest MKs: 6 (1949–1951)

Election symbol
- ו

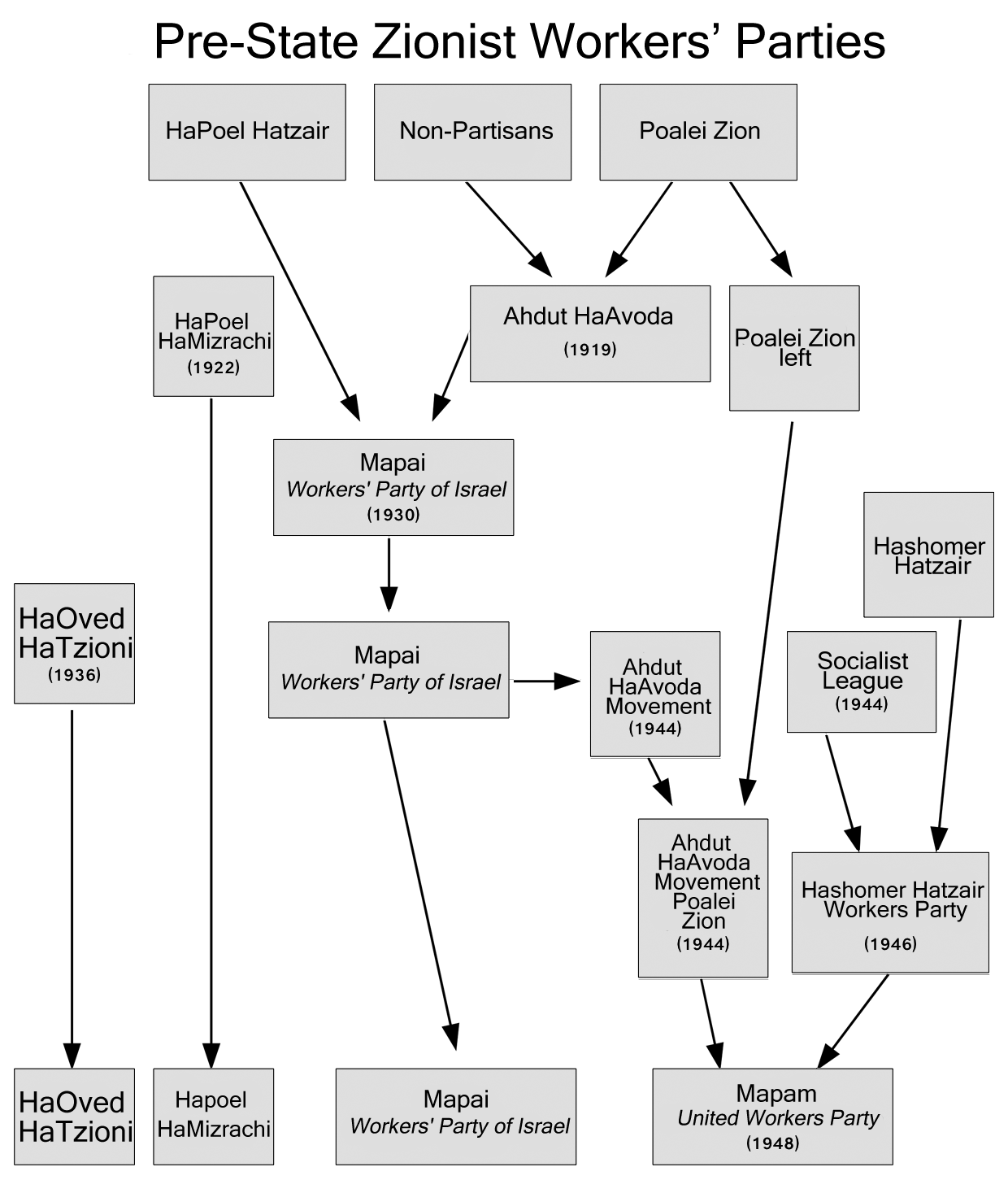
chart of zionist workers parties

Hapoel HaMizrachi (Hebrew: הַפּוֹעֵל הַמִּזְרָחִי, lit. 'Mizrachi Workers') was a political party and settlement movement in Israel. It was one of the predecessors of the National Religious Party and the Jewish Home.

== History ==
Hapoel HaMizrachi was formed in Jerusalem in 1922 under the Zionist slogan "Torah va'Avodah" (Torah and Labor), as a religious Zionist organisation that supported the founding of religious kibbutzim and moshavim where work was done according to Halakha. Its name came from the Mizrachi Zionist organisation, and is a Hebrew acronym for Religious Centre (Hebrew: מרכז רוחני, Merkaz Ruhani).

For the elections for the first Knesset the party ran as party of a joint list called the United Religious Front alongside Mizrachi, Agudat Yisrael and Poalei Agudat Yisrael. The group won 16 seats, of which Hapoel HaMizrachi took seven, making it the third largest party in the Knesset after Mapai and Mapam. It was invited to join the coalition government by David Ben-Gurion and Hapoel HaMizrachi MK Haim-Moshe Shapira was made Minister of Internal Affairs, Minister of Health and Minister of Immigration in the first government.

The United Religious Front played a major part in bringing down the first government due to it disagreement with Mapai over issues pertaining to education in the new immigrant camps and the religious education system, as well as its demands that the Supply and Rationing Ministry be closed and a businessman appointed as Minister for Trade and Industry. Ben-Gurion resigned on 15 October 1950. When the problems had been solved two weeks later, he formed the second government with the same coalition partners and ministers as previously.

In the 1951 elections the party ran for the Knesset alone under the title of Torah and Work – Hapoel HaMizrachi. They won eight seats, making them the fourth largest party. Again they joined the governing coalition, and remained a member through all four governments of the second Knesset. Shapira kept his position as Minister of Internal Affairs and also became Minister of Religions. When the third government collapsed, Shapira lost the Ministry of Internal Affairs and became Minister of Welfare. He regained the Ministry of Internal Affairs in the sixth government. Yosef Burg also became a minister, heading the Health Ministry in the third government, and the Postal Services Ministry in the fourth, fifth and sixth.

For the 1955 elections the party joined forces with its ideological twin, Mizrachi, to form the National Religious Front. The new party won eleven seats (of which Hapoel HaMizrachi held nine), making it the fourth largest, and were again coalition partners in both governments of the third Knesset. In 1956 the union of the two parties was made permanent, and the name changed to the National Religious Party.

== Election results ==
Election	Leader	Votes	%	Seats	+/–	Government
1925				6 / 221	New	N/A
1931		With Mizrachi		5 / 71	▼1	N/A
1944	Haim-Moshe Shapira	18,748	9.45	16 / 173	▲11	N/A
1949	Haim-Moshe Shapira	Part of United Religious Front		7 / 120	▼9	Coalition
1951	Haim-Moshe Shapira	46,347	6.74	8 / 120	▲2	Coalition
1955	Haim-Moshe Shapira	Part of National Religious Front		9 / 120	▲1	Coalition

== Knesset members ==
Knesset (MKs)	Knesset Members
1 (1949–1951) (7)	Moshe Unna, Yosef Burg, Eliyahu-Moshe Ganhovsky, Aharon-Ya'akov Greenberg, Zerach Warhaftig, Moshe Kelmer (replaced by Eliyahu Mazur of Agudat Yisrael on 11 March 1949), Haim-Moshe Shapira
2 (1951–1955) (8)	Haim-Moshe Shapira, Moshe Unna, Yitzhak Rafael, Yosef Burg, Zerach Warhaftig, Eliyahu-Moshe Ganhovsky, Moshe Kelmer, Michael Hasani
3 (1955–1956) (9)	Moshe Unna, Yosef Burg, Aharon-Ya'akov Greenburg, Zerach Warhaftig, Frija Zoaretz, Michael Hasani, Moshe Kelmer, Yitzhak Rafael, Haim-Moshe Shapira
