= Mizrachi (political party) =

Mizrachi המזרחי
- Leader: Yitzchak Yaacov Reines; Yehuda Leib Maimon; David-Zvi Pinkas; Mordechai Nurock
- Founded: 1902
- Dissolved: 1956
- Merged into: National Religious Party
- Newspaper: HaTzofe
- Ideology: Religious Zionism
- Alliances: United Religious Front (1949–1951); National Religious Front (1955–1956)
- Most MKs: 4 (1949–1951)
- Fewest MKs: 2 (1951–1956)

Election symbol

Mizrachi (Hebrew: המזרחי, HaMizrahi, an acronym for Merkaz Ruhani (מרכז רוחני), lit. 'Religious Centre') was a political party in Israel, and is one of the ancestors of the modern-day Religious Zionist Party.

== History ==
The Mizrachi movement was founded in 1902 in Vilnius as a religious Zionist organisation. It also had a trade union, Hapoel HaMizrachi, started in 1921. In the British Mandate of Palestine, the movement developed into a political party, HaMizrachi.

For the elections for the first Knesset, it ran as part of a joint list called the United Religious Front, alongside the Hapoel HaMizrachi, Agudat Yisrael, and Poalei Agudat Yisrael. The group won 16 seats, of which Mizrachi took four, making it the third-largest party in the Knesset, after Mapai and Mapam. It was invited to join the coalition government by David Ben-Gurion.

The United Religious Front played a major part in bringing down the first government, due to it disagreement with Mapai over issues pertaining to education in the new immigrant camps and the religious education system, as well as its demands that the Supply and Rationing Ministry be closed and a businessman appointed as Minister for Trade and Industry. Ben-Gurion resigned on 16 October 1950. When the problems had been solved two weeks later, he formed the second government, with the same coalition partners and ministers as previously.

In the 1951 elections, the party ran for the Knesset alone. However, they won only two seats. They joined the coalition that made up the third government, and both its MKs were made ministers – David-Zvi Pinkas became Minister of Transportation, and Mordechai Nurock became Minister of Postal Services. However, when the third government collapsed, both Pinkas and Nurock lost their ministerial positions, although the party remained in the coalitions of the fourth, fifth, and sixth governments.

For the 1955 elections, the party joined forces with its ideological twin, Hapoel HaMizrachi, to form the National Religious Front. The new party won 11 seats (though only two were held by Mizrachi members), making it the fourth-largest, and were again coalition partners in both governments of the third Knesset. In 1956, the union of the two parties was made permanent, and the name changed to the National Religious Party.

== Election results ==
Election	Leader	Votes	%	Seats	+/–	Government
1920	Yehuda Leib Maimon			9 / 314	New	N/A
1925	Yehuda Leib Maimon			7 / 221	▼1	N/A
1931	Yehuda Leib Maimon	With Hapoel HaMizrachi		5 / 71	▼2	N/A
1944	Yehuda Leib Maimon	6,513	3.28	7 / 173	▲2	N/A
1949	Yehuda Leib Maimon	Part of the United Religious Front		4 / 120	▼3	Coalition
1951	David-Zvi Pinkas	10,383	1.51	2 / 120	▼2	Coalition
1955	Mordechai Nurock	Part of National Religious Front		2 / 120	Steady	Coalition

== Knesset members ==
Knesset (MKs)	Knesset Members
1st (1949–1951) (4)	Yehuda Leib Maimon, Mordechai Nurock, David-Zvi Pinkas, Avraham-Haim Shag
2nd (1951–1955) (2)	Mordechai Nurock, David-Zvi Pinkas (replaced by Shlomo-Yisrael Ben-Meir)
3rd (1955–1956) (2)	Mordechai Nurock, Shlomo-Yisrael Ben-Meir
