= World Mizrachi =

Religious Zionist organization

- Logo used by the Mizrachi branch of Oradea in 1929
- Founder: Yitzchak Yaacov Reines
- Founded: 1902
- Split from: United Religious Front
- Merged into: United Religious Front; National Religious Party
- Youth wing: Bnei Akiva
- Ideology: Religious Zionism
- Most MKs: 4 (1949)

Election symbol
- ב

The Mizrachi (Hebrew: תנועת המזרחי, romanized: Tnuat HaMizrahi), is a religious Zionist organization founded in 1902 in Vilnius at a world conference of religious Zionists called by Rabbi Yitzchak Yaacov Reines (not to be confused with Mizrahim or Jews of the East). Bnei Akiva, which was founded in 1929, is the youth movement associated with Mizrachi. Both Mizrachi and the Bnei Akiva youth movement continued to function as international movements. Here the word "Mizrahi" is a notarikon (a kind of acronym) for "Merkaz Ruhani" lit. Spiritual centre (מרכז רוחני), introduced by rabbi Samuel Mohilever.

Mizrachi believes that the Torah should be at the centre of Zionism and also sees Jewish nationalism as a means of achieving religious objectives. The Mizrachi Party was the first official religious Zionist party and founded the Ministry of Religious Affairs in State of Israel and pushed for laws enforcing kashrut and the observance of the sabbath in the workplace. It also played a role prior to the establishment of Israel, building a network of religious schools that exist to this day, and took part in the 1951 elections.

== Yavneh Olami ==
Yavneh Olami was an international religious Zionist student organization, affiliated with World Mizrachi, that worked to inspire and educate Jewish students from the Diaspora to strengthen their connection to Israel and the Jewish People. The organization ran educational programs that focused on pro-Israel advocacy, Israel connectivity, leadership development, and encouraging Jewish students to make Israel their home. Yavneh Olami was headquartered in Jerusalem with offices in New York City and Toronto and an expanding volunteer network in the United Kingdom, Australia and South Africa. The organization often worked in partnership with Israeli governmental agencies and nonprofit organizations in Israel and abroad in order to meet the needs of religious Zionist students worldwide.

In 2006, it was reported that 15-20 computers were stolen which belonged to Yavneh Olami, a staffer was quoted as saying, "I fear that this will not become a very important story, as there has been a wave of such thefts in Jerusalem of late... Neither are the police likely to catch them, as it is assumed that the computers have already made their way to the 'territories' [Judea and Samaria]."

As of 2014, Enterprise Israel (formerly Yavneh Summer Internship Program) has been run by the World Mizrachi Movement. Each year Yavneh Olami features around "80 aliya-minded college students from around the globe in its six-week-long Summer Internship Program".

== In Poland ==
During the interwar period, the Mizrachi party was represented in the kehilla councils as well as in the municipal councils and in the Polish Sejm and Senate, e.g. by the Vilnius Chief Rabbi Yitzhak Rubinstein (1888–1945), Mizrachi senator (1922–1930, 1938–1939) and deputy (1930–1935), and by Rabbi Simon Federbusch, Sejm member from 1922 until 1927.

== In Israel ==
Major figures in the Religious Zionist Movement include Rabbi Abraham Isaac Kook who became the Ashkenazi Jews' Chief Rabbi of the British Mandate of Palestine in 1924 and tried to reconcile Zionism with Orthodox Judaism. However, Kook refused to be associated with Mizrachi specifically.

Mizrachi had a separate trade union wing, founded in 1921, Hapoel HaMizrachi, which represented religious Jews in the Histadrut and tried to attract religious Labor Zionists. The trade union also operated as a political party by the same name in the early days of Israel's existence, becoming the fourth-largest party in the 1951 elections.

In 1956, the Mizrachi party and Hapoel HaMizrachi merged to form the National Religious Party to advance the rights of religious Jews in Israel, having fought the 1955 election together as the National Religious Front. The party was an ever-present government coalition member until 1992. In 2008, the party merged into The Jewish Home, essentially a successor party which was soon superseded by other religious Zionist parties and eventually merged into the Religious Zionist Party (essentially Tkuma under a new name).

== In the United States ==
In the United States the ideals of and work of the Mizrachi movement have been carried out through the official Religious Zionists of America (RZA) movement that has been an important source of the ideology and guidance for Modern Orthodox Judaism and its rabbis and followers. It is affiliated with the Bnei Akiva youth movement which has a great influence on the Modern Orthodox Jewish day schools and synagogues. The American movement has served as a fundraising and lobbying arm for its Israeli counterparts.

Many of the Jewish leaders and rabbis of Yeshiva University actively identify with and support Mizrachi.

== In Latvia ==
In interwar Latvia, the Mizrahi (Mizrachi) political movement was regularly represented in the parliament, the Saeima until 1934, as well as engaged in other public activities.

== See also ==
- Religious Zionist Movement
- Zionist Organization Mizrachi
