= HaYom =

Hebrew-language newspaper

Hayom
- Type: Daily newspaper
- Editor: Yosef Kremerman
- Deputy editor: Yitzhak Rager
- Founded: January 11, 1966
- Ceased publication: December 14, 1969
- Political alignment: Gahal
- Language: Hebrew
- Headquarters: Metzudat Ze'ev
- City: Tel Aviv
- Country: Israel

HaYom (Hebrew: היום, lit. 'Today') was a Hebrew-language daily newspaper that was published by the Gahal party between 1965 and 1969.

== Establishment ==
The Gahal party consisted of the Herut movement, a political party in Israel which owned a newspaper called Herut, and the Israeli Liberal Party, which was affiliated with the newspaper HaBoker. Following the merger of the parties in 1965, the two newspapers were replaced by HaYom, which began publication on 11 January 1966.

The editorial offices and printing facilities were located at Metzudat Ze'ev in Tel Aviv. On the fourth floor were the newspaper's editorial offices, along with three Linotype machines, the printing manager's room, and the proofreaders' room. The printing press was an independent economic entity called "Citadel Printing, Ltd.", and was located in the basement. The edited material was lowered using a clip attached to the end of a rope that was dropped into the order room and the layout tables through an opening in the floor.

The first issue of HaYom was published on Tuesday, January 11, 1966, and cost 35 agorot to purchase. Its last publication was on December 14, 1969. The newspaper's budget manager was Avraham Eldan. Its editorial archive has not been preserved, but all its issues are located in the Jabotinsky Institute Archives.

== Newspaper format ==
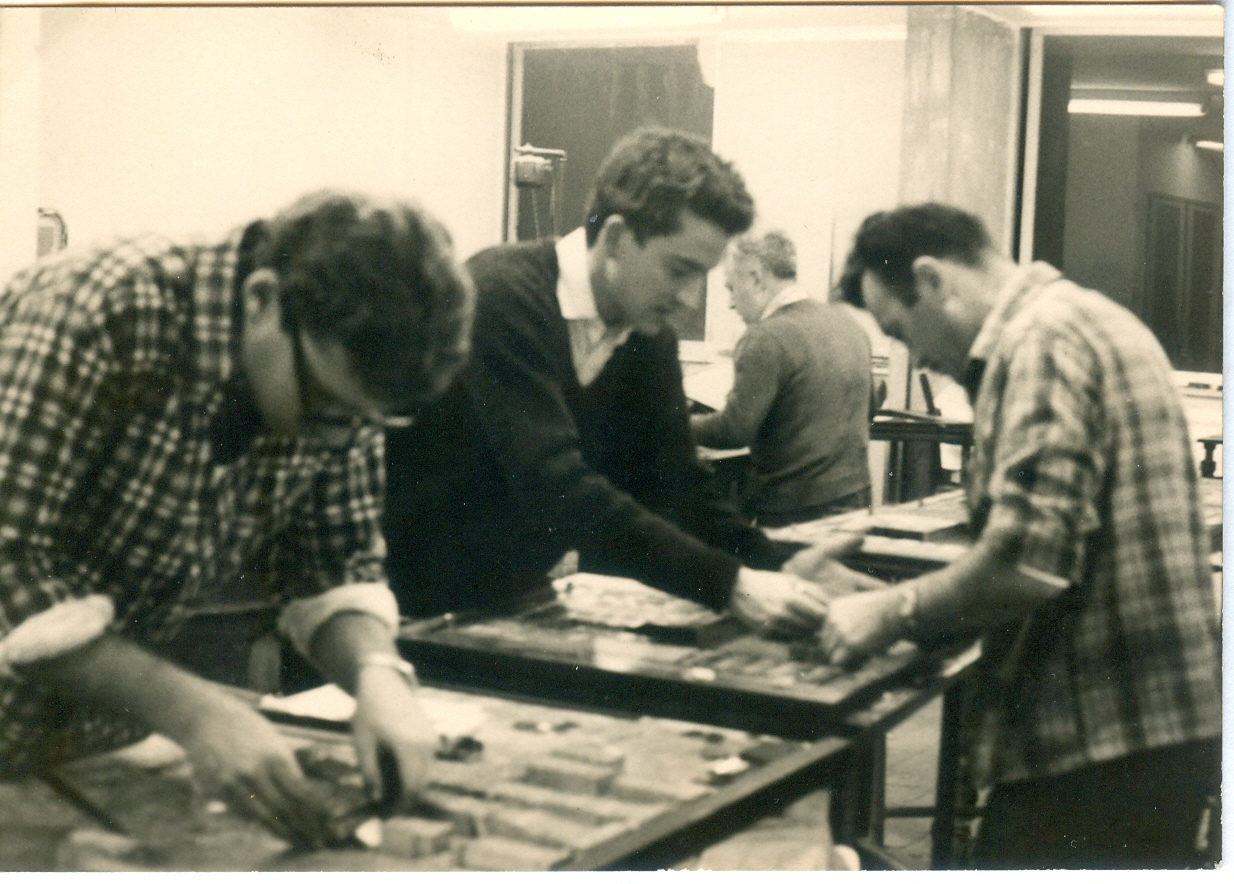
Night shift at Hayom newspaper in Tel Aviv, 1969. Center: Executive editor Yossi Ahimeir

The format of the newspaper was usually consistent throughout its run. There was a Buchwald cartoon on the front page. There was a "Conversations of the day" section about personalities, places, and subjects on page 2. On Friday and holiday eve newspapers, articles about socio-political and economic issues were published by members of the Gahal board, such as Menachem Begin, Yohanan Bader, Peretz Bernstein, and Yosef Sapir. Attached to it was a special page of the weekly updates of the liberal Herut bloc in the Histadrut (later, the page was published in a newspaper called Tchelet and White).

Editorials were initially written for the first few months by the leaders of the Gahal. Later, there was a more independent editor free of direct influence by members of the Gahal party, which was specifically emphasized following the ideological departure from scrutiny, which distinguished it from other ideologically-driven papers at the time.

== Staff ==
Many prominent journalists and politicians worked for HaYom throughout its four-year run. Staff include:

- Editor – Yosef Kremerman
- Executive editors – Gershon Hendel, Yitzhak Rager
- Night editors – Shlomo Okun, Yosef Ahimeir, Zizi Brandman
- Editorial board – Joseph Born (Editorial secretary), Zisi Stavi, Louis Isaac Rabinowitz, Wolfgang von Weisl, André Chouraqui, Israel Eldad, Benjamin Akzin, Joseph Nedava, Arye Naor, Gideon Gadot, Israel Harel, Yehudit Winkler, Yehuda Eidelstein, Emanuel Dudai
- Editors for the literature and art section – Miriam Tal, Gideon Allon, Yaakov Churgin
- Editor for the "at home and abroad" section – Yitzhak Ziv-Av
- Editor for the "theatre and exhibition" section – Eliakim Yaron
- Editor of the sports section – Moshe Kashtan
