= Ironi He High School =

High school in Tel Aviv

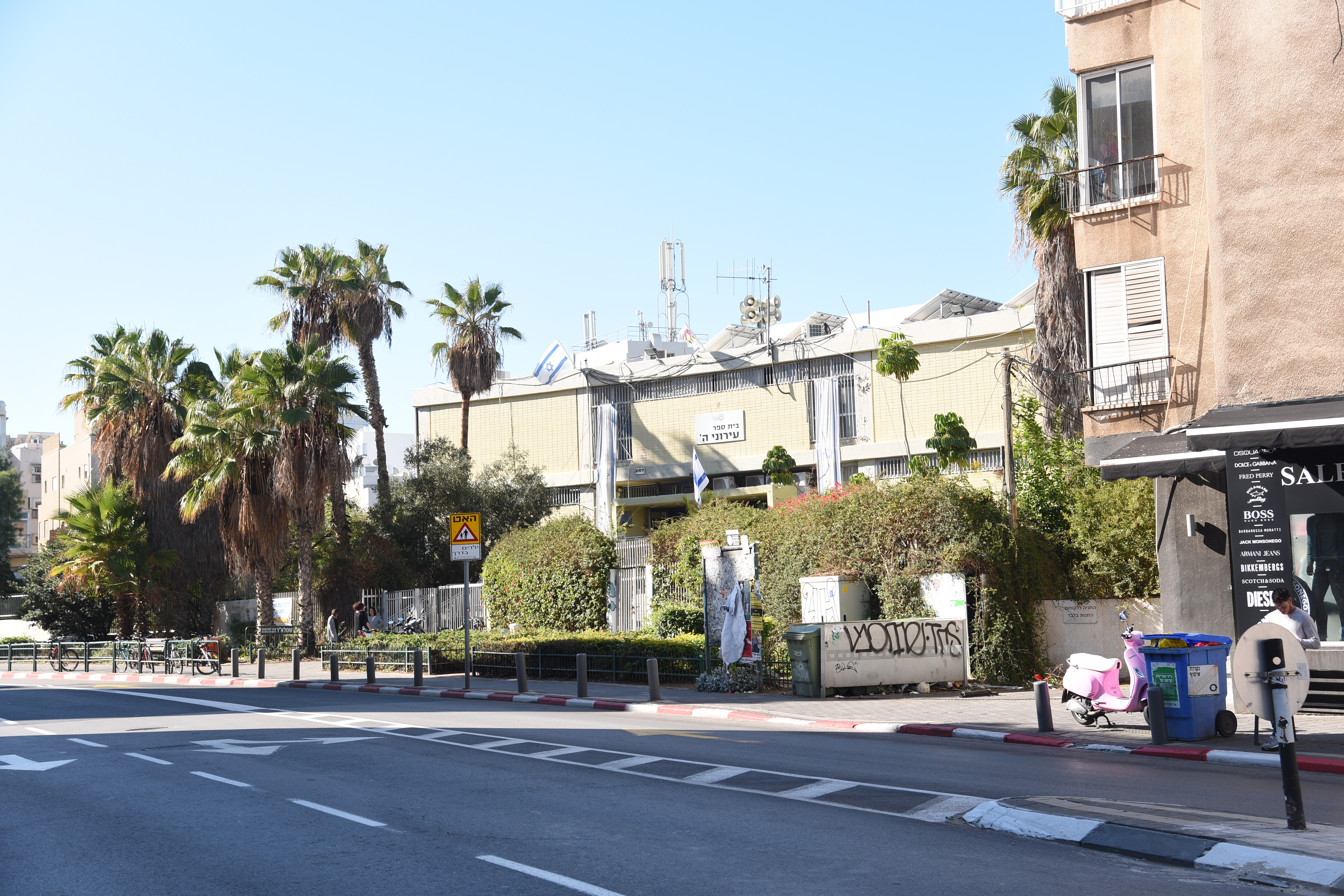
- Facade of building from Ben Yehuda Street

Location
- Ben Yehuda St 227, Tel Aviv-Yafo, Israel; Tel Aviv, Israel, Tel Aviv District; 32°05′44″N 34°46′30″E

Information
- School type: Public
- Motto: כבוד, אחריות, שייכות (Respect, responsibility, belonging)
- Established: 1953
- Status: Open
- Principal: Nira Hayut
- Enrollment: 715 (2009)
- Website: www.tlv-edu.gov.il/sites/Ironyh/Pages/default.aspx

Ironi He High School (Hebrew: תיכון עירוני ה'), nicknamed The Dr. Shaul Levin Municipal High School (Hebrew: ד"ר שאול לוין) is a secondary school on Ben Yehuda Street in Tel Aviv in the Northwest section of the Old North neighborhood of Tel Aviv, the only secondary school in the district. It is ranked among the best high schools in Israel.

== History ==
Ironi He was established in 1953 by Dr. Moshe Landau, who served as its principal from 1953 to 1986. Until 1955, it opereated in a temporary location on Henrietta Szold street. It later moved to Mazeh Street in Lev Tel Aviv. In 1965, it moved to its current location in a building designed by architect Aba Elhanani.

Until the mid-1980s, the school only acted as a high school for grades 9 to 12. Following the national plan of the Ministry of Education, it was adjoined by a middle school, which was located inside of the former building of the Levinsky College of Education on Ben Yehuda street, 500 meters south of the high school. As of the 2020s, the two schools are located in the high school building, the Levinsky College, and a science and arts center that opened during the 2008–2009 school year.

Presidents
Term	President
1953–1986	Dr. Moshe Landau
1986–1998	Nachman Sirkin
1998–2005	Dr. Dov Orbach
2005–2012	Miriam Gol
2012–2018	Yehoram Levy
2018	Orna Mazor (interim)
2018–2025	Limor Miller
2025-Present	Nira Hayut

In 2009, the school had a total enrollment of 715 students. Science studies for physics and chemistry took place at the Center for Science Education in Tel Aviv-HEMDA. The school operates its own art and sciences center, as well as a gallery for art exhibitions. The school operates a student program for further education in the quantitative sciences in partnership with the Mofet Association.

In 2022, it was reported by the Tel Aviv government that Ironi He had a college acceptance rate of 98.7%. Additionally, it placed fifth in the country among math performance and twelfth in English performance. The school was ranked ninth (in a 3-way tie) in the country in April 2024.

== Notable alumni ==
- Colette Avital
- Benny Begin
- Michael Bar-Zohar
- Emanuel Dudai
- Michael Eitan
- Shoshana Felman
- Michal Govrin
- Judith Gal-Ezer
- Daniel Hagari
- Michael Handelzalts
- Benjamin Z. Kedar
- Emanuel Levy
- Mario Livio
- Alex Levac
- Maya Maron
- Ariel Merari
- Uri Milstein
- Yishai Sarid
- Anita Shapira
- Dalit Stauber
- Zisi Stavi
- Michal Zion
