= Gideon Gadot =

Israeli journalist and politician

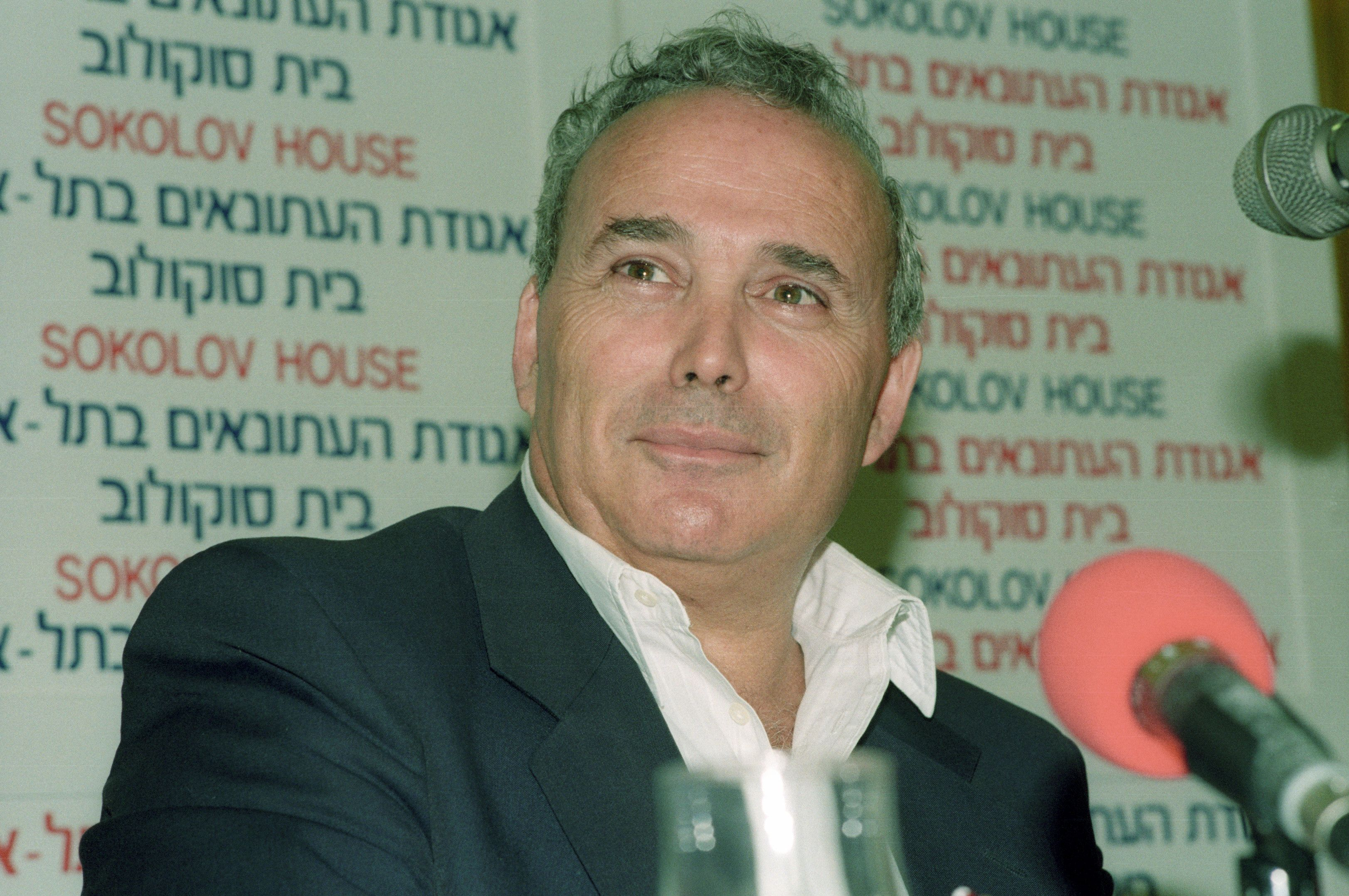
- Gadot in 1991

Faction represented in the Knesset
- 1984–1992: Likud

Personal details
- Born: 1 April 1941 Bnei Brak, Mandatory Palestine
- Died: 21 September 2012 (aged 71)

Gideon Gadot (Hebrew: גדעון גדות; 1 April 1941 – 21 September 2012) was an Israeli journalist and politician who served as a member of the Knesset for Likud between 1984 and 1992.

== Biography ==
Born Gideon Foreman in Bnei Brak during the Mandate era, Gadot was the nephew of Aryeh Ben-Eliezer. He attended the Mikveh Israel agricultural high school before studying sociology and communications at university in South Africa. He joined the Betar youth movement in 1951, and was a member of the organisation's national leadership between 1965 and 1968. During his time in South Africa, he acted as an emissary for the organisation.

He worked as a journalist for Herut, HaYom, and HaYom HaZe, before becoming head of the Herut party's spokesperson's section in 1977, working there until 1982. From 1981 to 1996 he was chairman of the board of Mifal HaPayis, Israel's national lottery.

In 1984 he was elected to the Knesset on the Likud list (then an alliance of Herut and other right-wing parties). He was re-elected in 1988 and appointed Deputy Speaker, a position he held for four years. Gadot lost his seat in the 1992 elections.

Gadot died on 21 September 2012 and was buried at Nahalat Yitzhak cemetery in Tel Aviv on 23 September 2012.
