= Zisi Stavi =

Israeli literary editor (1939–2021)

- זיסי סתוי
- Born: Zisi Zastbecker; April 13, 1939; Tel Aviv, British Palestine
- Died: December 1, 2021 (aged 82); Israel
- Education: Hebrew University of Jerusalem
- Occupation: Editor
- Organization: Hebrew Writers Association in Israel
- Spouse: Dvora
- Children: 2

Zisi Stavi (Hebrew: זיסי סתוי; April 13, 1939 – December 1, 2021) was an Israeli literary editor and musical scholar. He served for more than 30 years as an editor at Yedioth Ahronoth

== Biography ==
Stavi was born in Tel Aviv in 1939 as Zisi Zastbecker (Hebrew: זיסי זסטבקר). He attended Ironi He High School, and went to college at the Hebrew University of Jerusalem for a degree in Biblical and Hebrew Literature. After graduation, he began his career as an assistant editor at the Israeli public radio station, Kol Yisrael. He additionally spend time as an editor for the circulation of the Israel Philharmonic Orchestra, as well as at: Moznaim, HaBoker, and HaYom. He was a member of the Hebrew Writers Association in Israel.

He served from 1973 to 2004 as the editor of the literature section for one of Israel's largest newspapers, Yedioth Ahronoth. Following his retirement from the paper, this position was filled by Shulamit Gilboa. In 2008, he was a winner of the Prime Minister's Prize for Hebrew Literary Works.

He died on December 1st, 2021.

== Personal life ==
Stavi was married to his wife Dvora, and had two sons: Yair and Yaron. He was a resident of Ramat HaSharon.

== Selected works ==
- Stavi, Zisi, ed. (2000). Mah zot ahavah? mivḥar shire ahavah meha-sifrut ha-ʻIvrit ha-ḥadashah. Tel-Aviv: Yediʻot aḥaronot : Sifre ḥemed. ISBN 978-965-448-815-0.
- Stavi, Zisi; Galai, Chaya, eds. (2007). 50 stories from Israel: an anthology. Tel-Aviv: Yedioth Ahronoth. ISBN 978-965-448-694-1.
