= Rager =

Rager is a surname. Notable people with the surname include:

- Chris Rager, American voice actor
- Jordan Rager (born 1994), American country music singer
- Mose Rager (1911–1986), American guitarist
- Roger Rager (1948–2022), American racing driver
- Yitzhak Rager (1932–1997), Israeli journalist, diplomat and a Likud mayor of Beersheba

== See also ==
- A♯1 Roller Rager, a song by American heavy metal band CKY
- Early 20 Rager, a song from the debut studio album by American rapper Lil Uzi Vert
- Man on the Moon II: The Legend of Mr. Rager, the second studio album by American rapper Kid Cudi
- The Rager, the third episode of The Vampire Diaries's fourth season
