= Emanuel Dudai =

Israeli journalist (1939–2023)

- עמנואל דודאי
- Born: May 15, 1939; Tel Aviv, British Palestine
- Died: February 9, 2023 (aged 83)
- Education: Ironi He High School
- Occupations: Journalist, businessman, radio host
- Years active: 1957–1989
- Criminal charges: Fraud; Theft; Forgery; Tax evasion Deceptive business practices

Emanuel Dudai (Hebrew: עמנואל דודאי; 15 May 1939 – 9 February 2023) was an Israel journalist, radio host, and television personality.

== Biography ==
=== Early life and career beginnings ===
Dudai was born in Tel Aviv in 1939 and attended Ironi He High School (Tel Aviv). He grew up with an older brother, who died while during the 1948 Israeli War of Independence. He first appeared on radio in the 1950s on Israeli Army Radio during his time as a soldier, which was initially broadcast in Ramat Gan. He moved with Army Radio to Jaffa where he became an editor for the station.

After his time in the IDF, he worked as an editor at the United Press news agency and as the press officer of El Al. He worked as the economic editor of Hayom until its closure in 1969. In 1965, he was charged with forgery and was given a fine. In 1966, he was sentenced to 3 months of probation for check fraud. In 1968, he produced records of history documentaries for Israeli record producer Hed Arzi.

=== Business dealings and business fraud ===
In 1970, Dudai was hired by the news department of Channel One, and was subsequently fired two years later under accusations of having accepted bribes from a public relations manager to publish a positive piece about a band named Bat Dor. In the late 1970s and early 1980s, he worked in the imported goods business. He was heavily criticized in-industry with accusations of having forged documents, check fraud, and evading payments on VAT. In 1984, he was sentenced into 4 and a half years for various fraudulent activities in his business dealings, although upon appeal to the Supreme Court of Israel, his sentence was reduced to 2 and a half years with the rest of his sentence being suspended.

In September 1989, he was again convicted of fraud, as well as theft, forgery, and attempted deceptive practices from hundreds of clients. He was sentenced to 4 years in prison. Some of the criminal activity occurred while he was living on a suspended sentence from his previous conviction.
