= Herzl Rosenblum =

Israeli journalist and politician (1903–1991)

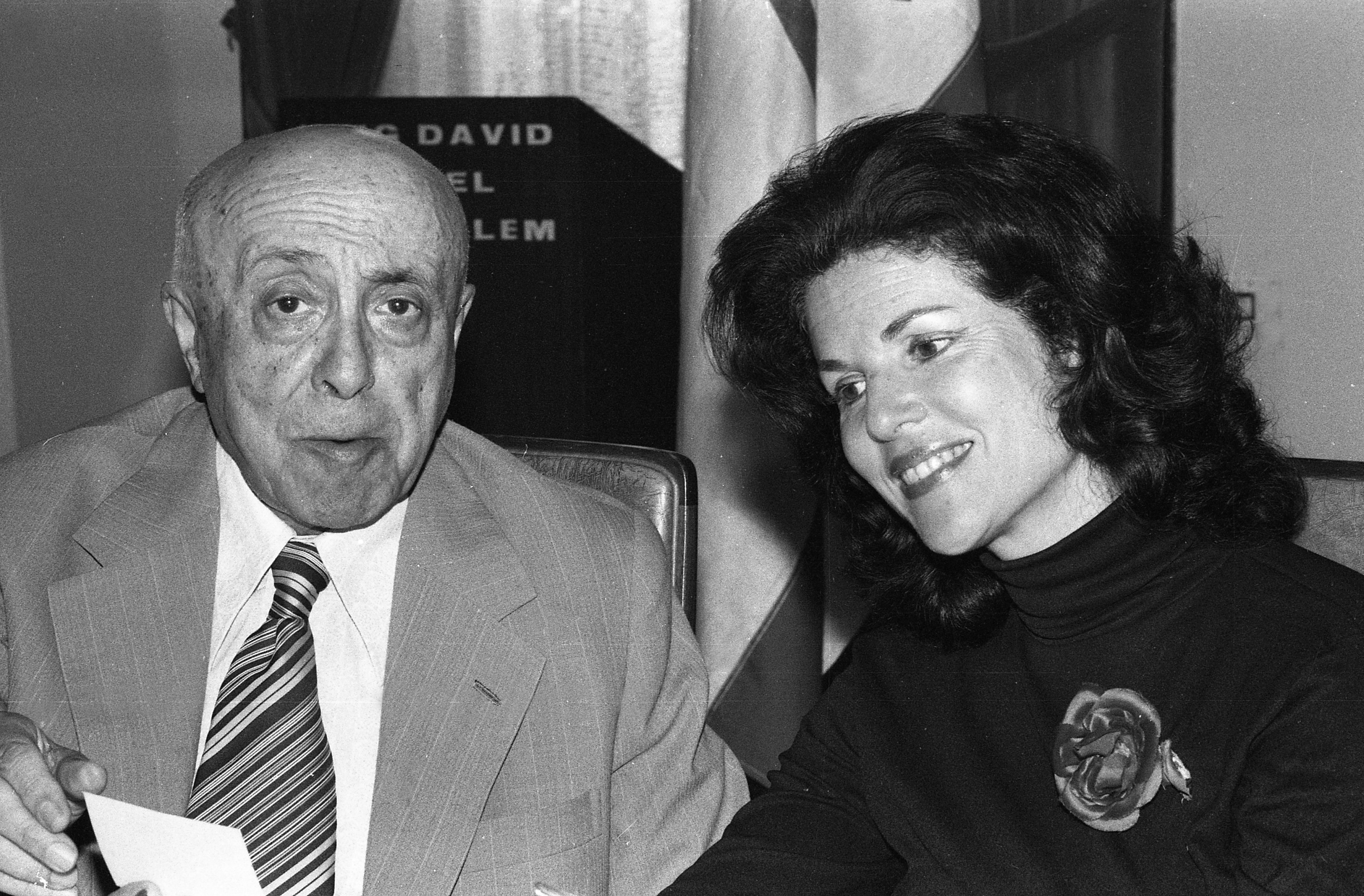
Rosenblum in 1978

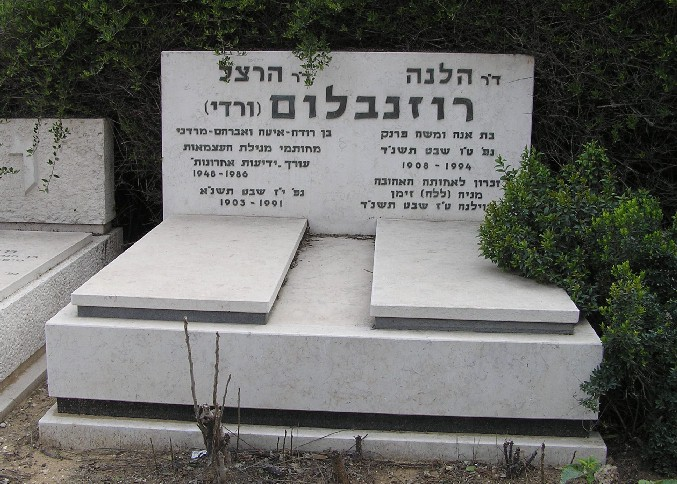
Rosenblum's tomb in Tel Aviv

Herzl Rosenblum (Hebrew: הרצל רוזנבלום; 14 August 1903 – 1 February 1991), also known as Herzl Vardi, was an Israeli journalist and politician. A signatory of the Israeli declaration of independence, he worked as editor of Yedioth Ahronoth for more than 35 years.

== Biography ==
Born in Kaunas in the Russian Empire (today in Lithuania), Rosenblum moved to Vienna after experiencing antisemitism and being prevented from studying law. In Vienna, he studied law and economics, gaining a PhD.

He then moved to London, where he worked as an aide to Ze'ev Jabotinsky, a leader of the Revisionist Zionism movement. In 1935 he immigrated to Mandate Palestine and started working for the HaBoker newspaper, where he wrote under the pseudonym Herzl Vardi.

In 1948 Rosenblum signed Israel's declaration of independence as a representative of the Revisionist movement. When he stepped up to sign, Yishuv leader David Ben-Gurion told him "Sign Vardi, not Rosenblum", as he wanted more Hebrew names on the document. Although Rosenblum later legally changed his name to Vardi (hence his son being named Moshe Vardi), he never used it, and later admitted that he wished he had signed as Rosenblum.

The following year, Rosenblum became editor of Yedioth Ahronoth following the departure of Ezriel Carlebach and several other staff members to found Yedioth Maariv. He remained as editor until 1986, during which time the paper became the largest selling in the country. His son, Moshe, was later employed as editor. After his retirement he published his memoirs, Drops from the Sea (Hebrew: טיפות מן הים, Tipot min HaYam).
