= Yosef Kremerman =

Israeli politician

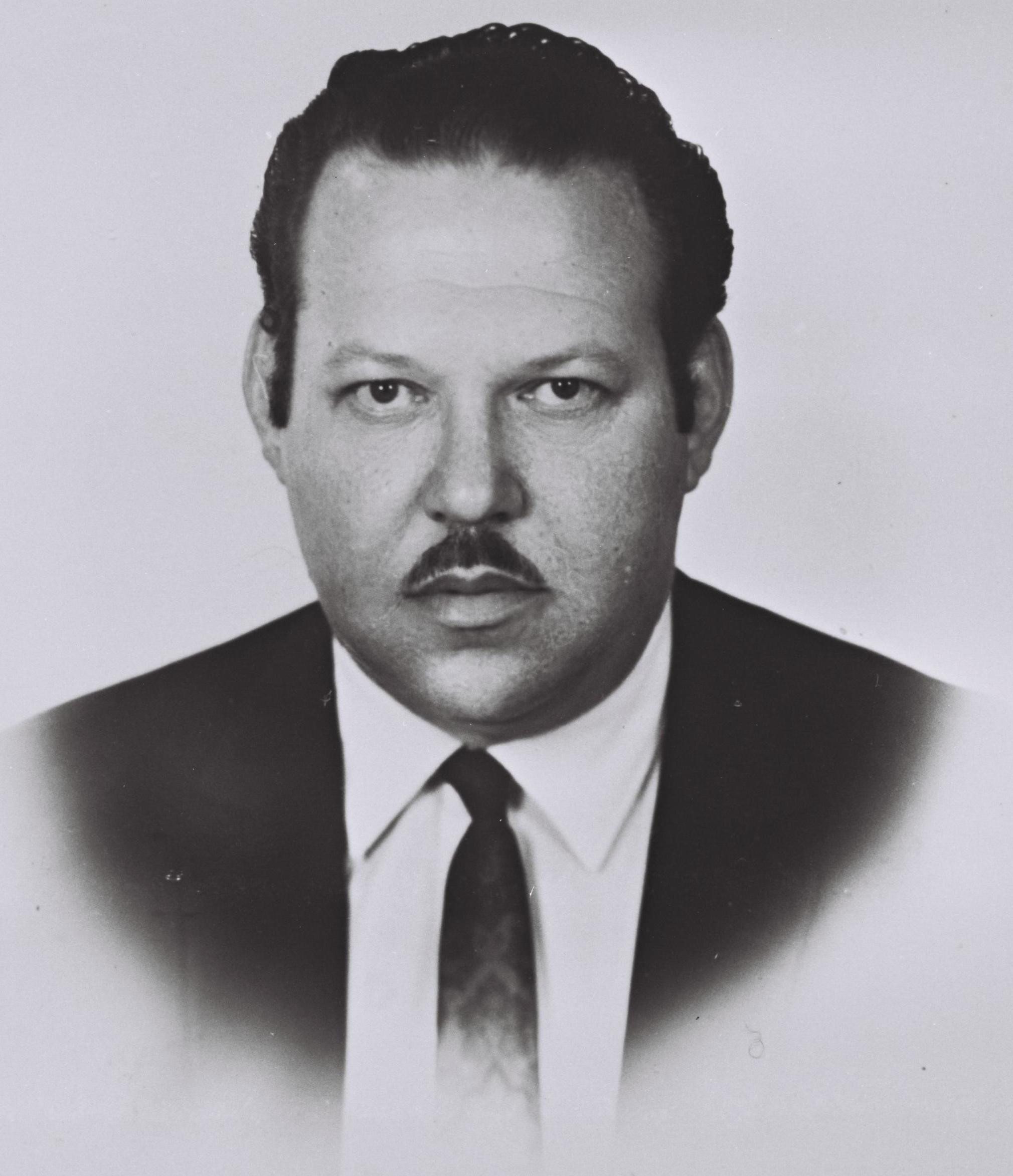
- Kremerman in 1969

Faction represented in the Knesset
- 1964–1965: Herut
- 1965–1974: Gahal
- 1974–1977: Likud

Personal details
- Born: 10 January 1926; Haifa, Mandatory Palestine
- Died: 12 November 1981 (aged 55)

Yosef Kremerman (Hebrew: יוסף קרמרמן; 10 January 1926 – 12 November 1981) was an Israeli politician who served as a member of the Knesset for Herut, Gahal and Likud between 1964 and 1977.

== Biography ==
Born in Haifa during the Mandate era, Kremerman was educated at a high school in Tel Aviv, before studying law, business administration and forestry.

A member of the Irgun, he travelled to Europe after World War II to work as an emissary with Holocaust survivors, before returning to Israel on the Altalena. He joined the Herut party, and became chairman of its Tel Aviv branch and editor of its HaYom newspaper. He was also appointed the party's treasurer in 1957. He was on the party's list for the 1961 elections, and although he failed to win a seat, he entered the Knesset on 20 August 1964 as a replacement for the deceased Avraham Drori. He retained his seat in elections the following year (before which Herut had formed the Gahal alliance with the Liberal Party), and in elections in 1969 and 1973 (by which time Gahal had merged into Likud). He remained an MK until the 1977 elections.

Outside politics Krememan was one of the owners of the Etz Lavud company. He died of a heart attack in 1981.
