= Michal Zion =

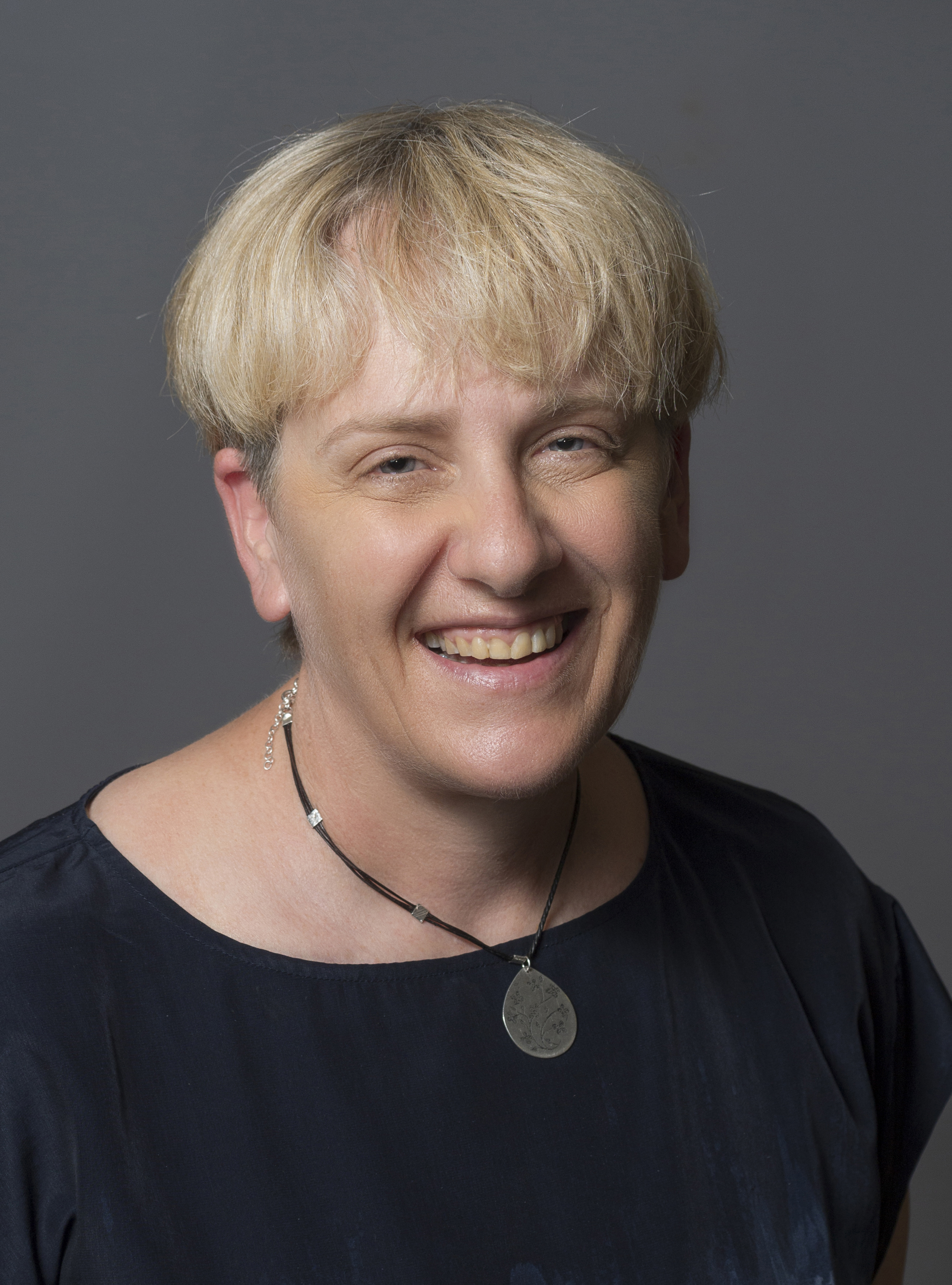
Michal Zion

Michal Zion (Hebrew: מיכל ציון) is a professor and the head of the Biology Education Center at the Faculty of Education, Bar-Ilan University. Her scholarly work examines open Inquiry-based learning in the context of Biology education, as well as Environmental Literacy Plan.

== Biography ==
Michal Zion was born and raised in Tel Aviv. During her military service, she taught soldiers at Har Gilo Field School, the Society for the Protection of Nature in Israel. She earned her B.Sc. in biology from the Hebrew University of Jerusalem. She obtained her doctorate in the School of Medicine at the Hebrew University under the supervision of Prof. Yinon Ben-Neriah. The dissertation titled “The regulation of human abl gene expression in Philadelphia positive leukemic cells in comparison to normal cells.” The research provides insights into the epigenetics mechanisms involved in tumorigenesis, specifically how progressive methylation Chronic myelogenous leukemia, and was published in the Proceedings of the National Academy of Sciences of the United States of America. During her PhD studies, she received a biology teaching diploma and taught at Ironi He High School, her Alma mater. The center for development and support for high school biology labs. Bar-Ilan University.

In 2000, Zion became a lecturer at the School of Education at Bar-Ilan University and has been affiliated ever since. In 2008, she was appointed senior lecturer; in 2014, she was appointed associate professor and the head of the Science Education Center, the Biology Education Center. As the deputy head of the School of Education, in 2003 she was appointed full professor. 2005-2006: Sabbatical fellowship at the Science and Mathematics Education Centre (SMEC), Curtin University, Perth, Australia. She heads The National Center for Support and Development of Biology School Laboratories, The Faculty of Education, Bar-Ilan University In 2017, she received the rector prize for Scientific Innovation from Bar-Ilan University.

In 2020, she initiated the environmental project and the NGO “Take the Garbage with you” to keep Israel's natural sites clean. She initiated various educational and environmental projects with the Weizmann Institute of Science and the Council for a Beautiful Israel.

Michal Zion is married, has three children, and resides in Maccabim.

== Research ==
Michal Zion's studies focused on Active learning, especially the open-inquiry-based learning and teaching approach to Science Studies. A review article published in the Educational Research Review that analyzes the current research on the open-inquiry-based approach in science teaching and learning cites six of Zion's papers among the 24 most influential papers in the field.

She discusses the shift from structured to open inquiry in science education in an article. The study explores how inquiry-based learning can simulate scientific research processes, emphasizing the need for high-order thinking and student ownership of investigations. The model, implemented in Israeli high school biology curricula, promotes a social constructivism approach to science education, moving away from traditional instructional methods. In another article, Zion compares the dynamic inquiry performances of students engaged in open versus guided inquiry learning environments. The research shows that open inquiry students, involved from the early stages of the inquiry process, outperform their guided inquiry peers in dynamic inquiry performances characterized by Intellectual flexibility and critical thinking. Another study examines the preferences of Israeli high school biology students between open and guided inquiry projects. The results indicate that students favor open inquiry projects, as they feel more satisfied and perceive more significant benefits despite differences in documentation efforts. Zion explored how metacognitive guidance and peer collaboration enhance environmental literacy. The meta-CIC model integrates open inquiry-based learning with strategies to improve students' thinking and understanding of environmental issues. The approach emphasizes reflective learning and collaboration to foster more profound engagement and problem-solving skills for ecological challenges. Another article investigates the role of curiosity in open-inquiry learning among high school students. She identified four models for establishing logical connections between inquiry questions, contributing to the open inquiry planning process. The study shows that curious students pursue inquiries with less certainty but with a higher degree of dynamic inquiry. A qualitative research analyzes the diverse teaching practices within the Israeli high school biology curriculum, Biomind, emphasizing open inquiry. The study identifies teachers' challenges in facilitating dynamic inquiry, such as limited scientific knowledge and time constraints, and suggests professional development strategies to address these issues. She investigates the teacher-student dynamic in the open inquiry process within the Biomind curriculum. The study highlights how teachers facilitate self-directed student learning, fostering scientific literacy, motivation, and responsibility. The findings stress the importance of collaboration between teachers and students in dynamic inquiry settings.
