= Shimshon Unichman =

Israeli politician (1907–1961)

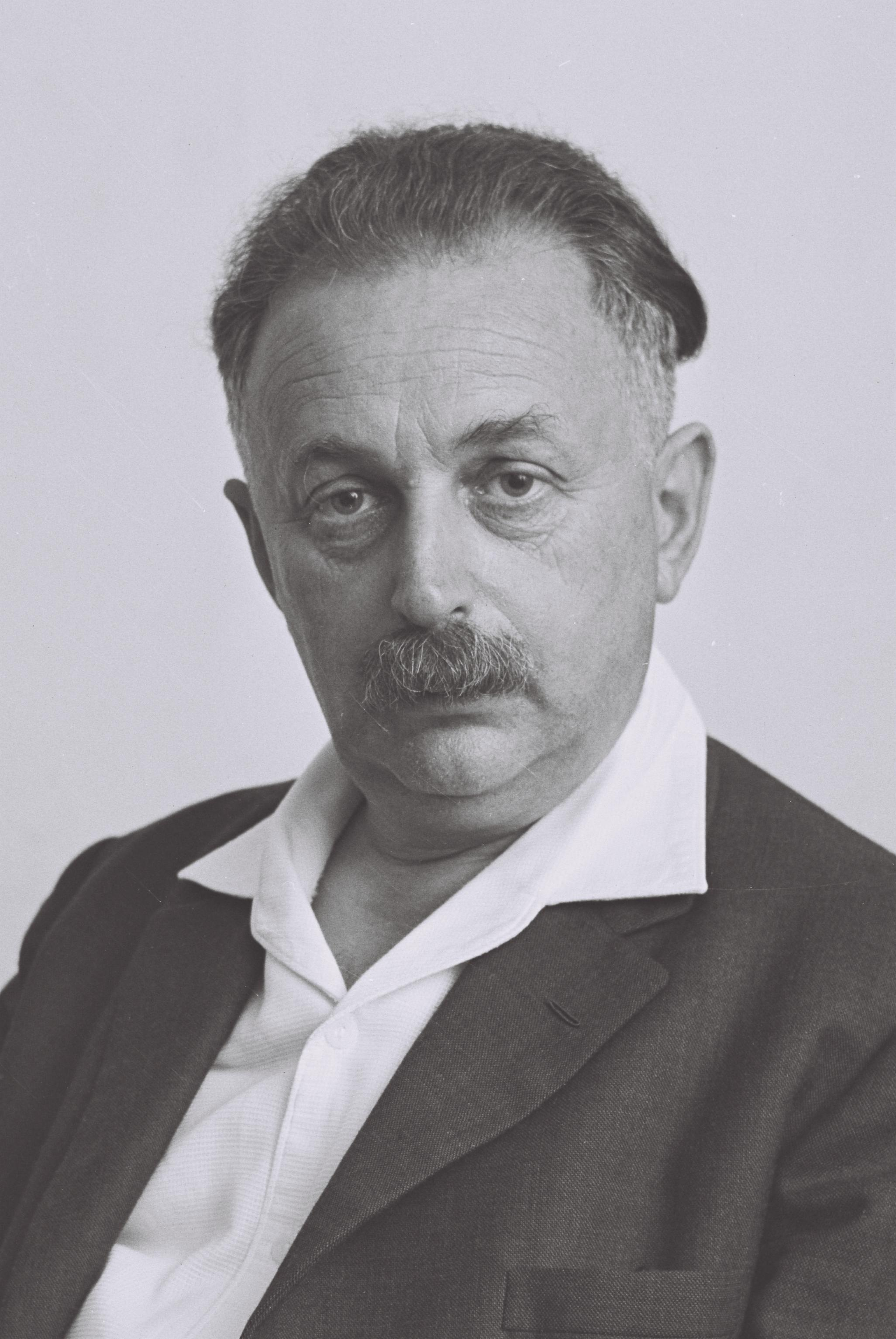
- Unichman in 1959

Faction represented in the Knesset
- 1955–1961: Herut

Personal details
- Born: 13 February 1907 Lutsk, Russian Empire
- Died: 21 March 1961 (aged 54)

Shimshon Unichman (Hebrew: שמשון יוניצ'מן; 13 February 1907 – 21 March 1961) was an Israeli politician who served as a member of the Knesset for Herut between 1955 and 1961.

== Biography ==
Born in Lutsk in the Russian Empire (today in Ukraine), Unichman studied medicine at university in Prague and was certified as an MD. In Prague he became involved with the Betar movement, and in 1932 he joined the national directorate of the Polish branch of the movement.

In 1935 he emigrated to Mandatory Palestine, where he became commander of a Betar mobilisation platoon in Rosh Pinna. He also became a member of the Hatzohar central committee. In 1944 he was arrested by the British authorities, and sent to a detention camp in Eritrea. Between 1946 and 1948 he served as head of the World Secretariat of Revisionist Zionists.

After independent in 1948 he joined Herut, and was elected to the Knesset on the party's list in 1955. He was re-elected in 1959 and died whilst still an MK on 21 March 1961. His seat was taken by Avraham Drori.

Streets in Tel Aviv and Kiryat Shmona are named after him.
