= Emanuel Levy =

American film critic and author

- Education: Columbia University
- Occupations: Film Professor; Film Critic; Author
- Years active: 1976-present
- Awards: President, Los Angeles Film Critics Association, 1996-1999; Membership in National Society of Film Critics (NSFC); Membership in Online Film Critics Society (OFCS); Membership in Critics Choice Awards (CCA)
- Website: emanuellevy.com Cinema 24/7

Emanuel Levy is an American film critic and professor emeritus of sociology and film of Arizona State University.

For the past 50 years, Levy has taught a variety of courses in sociology, film studies, and popular culture at Columbia University, New School for Social Research, Wellesley College, UCLA, and Arizona State University.

== Early life and education ==
Levy grew up in Tel Aviv, after his family emigrated to Israel from Europe. He attended Ironi He High School in Israel. After military service as a combat officer in the Israeli Defense Force he attended Tel Aviv University, where he obtained a B.A. degree in Sociology, Anthropology and Political Science (magna cum laude). He pursued a M.Phil and Ph.D. (in distinction) in Sociology of Art (focusing on film and theater) from Columbia University in 1975 and 1978, respectively.

== Career ==
Levy has taught at Columbia University, New School for Social Research, Wellesley College, Arizona State University and UCLA Film School. Levy currently teaches in the department of cinema studies at New York University.

Levy is the only critic in the U.S. who's a voting member of eight groups: Hollywood Foreign Press Association (HFPA, Golden Globes), Los Angeles Film Critics (LAFCA), Critics Choice Awards (CCA), National Society of Film Critics (NSFC), New York Film Critics Online, Gay and Lesbian Critics Association GALECA, Online Film Critics Society and the International Federation of Film Critics FIPRESCI. He was the president of LAFCA from 1996 to 1999, during which he initiated, with the support of his v.p. Manohla Dargis (now chief film critic of The New York Times), the move of the annual awards event from a modest luncheon to a more lavish evening kudo.

His first book, The Habima—Israel's National Theater, 1917–1977, launched his writing career and was the winner of the 1980 National Jewish Book Award. His critical chronicle of the Oscar Awards, And the Winner Is: History and Politics of the Academy Awards was published in 1986. He has published updated editions of that book, including Oscar Fever in 2000 and All About Oscar in 2003.

Among his books is Cinema of Outsiders: The Rise of American Independent Film (1999), a 600-page text that was semi-finalist for the National Book Awards. The book examines the various social, political, economic and artistic forces that have shaped the emergence of low-budget American indies as a distinct institutional cinema, operating parallel to and against mainstream Hollywood cinema.

In his 1994 comprehensive biography of George Cukor, Master of Elegance: The Director and His Stars (William Morrow), he disputed the commonly held belief (or myth) that Cukor was fired from the 1939 classic Gone With the Wind, because Clark Gable did not think he was "macho" enough to direct. Instead, Levy offers as reasons the conflict between him and producer David O. Selznick over the screenplay (which was not ready when shooting began) and pacing and tempo, which Selznick thought were not right.. Cukor had worked on pre-production of that film, including the casting of all the roles for two years, 1937-1939.

Levy wrote the first comprehensive biography of Vincente Minnelli, Vincente Minnelli: Hollywood's Dark Dreamer in 2009. In this book, he argued that Minnelli's sexual identity is a crucial variable in understanding the kinds of narratives and visual styles of his films, particularly his melodramas, such as The Bad and the Beautiful, and the more personal and intimate Tea and Sympathy.

In 2000, he co-organized with the Film Department of the Los Angeles County Museum of Art a tribute weekend to the influential critic Andrew Sarris, coinciding with the publication of Citizen Sarris: American Film Critic, Essays in Honor of Andrew Sarris. On that occasion, Sarris chose to screen The Shop Around the Corner and Shoot the Piano Player, films that were followed by panels headed by noted critics Richard Schickel and Oscar-winning director Curtis Hanson. Levy has appeared in numerous films, documentaries, TV channels, including shows on the BRAVO network and the Independent Film Channel, as well as radio programs on NPR.. He continues to appear in documentaries for independent filmmakers and television, as well as on selected DVD releases.

Levy has written for various newspapers and magazines, including American Film, The Advocate, Out, The Jerusalem Post, The New York Times Magazine and Los Angeles Times. Over the past 15 years, he has been a regular contributor to the film section of Financial Times. While in Arizona, he ran the ASU Film Society, and then the Scottsdale Independent Film Festival. He was a senior critic at Variety for over a decade, and the chief film critic of the UK publication Screen International for three years. Levy established a website of film reviews and essays in 2003, Cinema 24/7. As of 2025, the site contained over 33,000 film reviews, profiles, interviews and Oscar commentaries, written by Levy and a staff of writers.

== Personal life ==
In 1980, Levy met Rob Remley, then a Merce Cunningham dancer, and began the most meaningful relationship of his life. In 1990, they moved to the West Coast and lived together in the Hollywood Hills until 2011, when Remley died from genetic colon cancer.

== Bibliography ==
- The Habima, Israel's National Theater: A Study of Cultural Nationalism. Columbia University Press. 1979. ISBN 9780231045827.
- And the Winner Is: The History and Politics of the Oscar Awards. Frederick Ungar Publishing Company. 1987. ISBN 9780804425100.
- John Wayne: Prophet of the American Way of Life. The Scarecrow Press. 1988. ISBN 9780810820548.
- Small-Town America in Film: The Decline and Fall of Community. Continuum International Publishing Group. 1991. ISBN 9780826404848.
- George Cukor: Master of Elegance. William Morrow and Company. 1994. ISBN 9780688112462.
- Cinema of Outsiders: The Rise of American Independent Film. New York University Press. 1999. ISBN 9780814751244.
- Citizen Sarris, American Film Critic: Essays in Honor of Andrew Sarris. The Scarecrow Press. 2001. ISBN 9780810838918.
- Oscar Fever: The History and Politics of the Academy Awards. Continuum International Publishing Group. 2001. ISBN 9780826412843.
- All About Oscar: The History and Politics of the Academy Awards. Continuum International Publishing Group. 2003. ISBN 9780826414526.
- Vincente Minnelli: Hollywood's Dark Dreamer. St. Martin's Press. 2009. ISBN 9780312329259.
- Gay Directors/Gay Films: Pedro Almodóvar, Terence Davies, Todd Haynes, Gus Van Sant, John Waters. Columbia University Press. 2015. ISBN 9780231152778.
