= Avraham Drori =

Israeli politician (1919–1964)

- אברהם דרורי
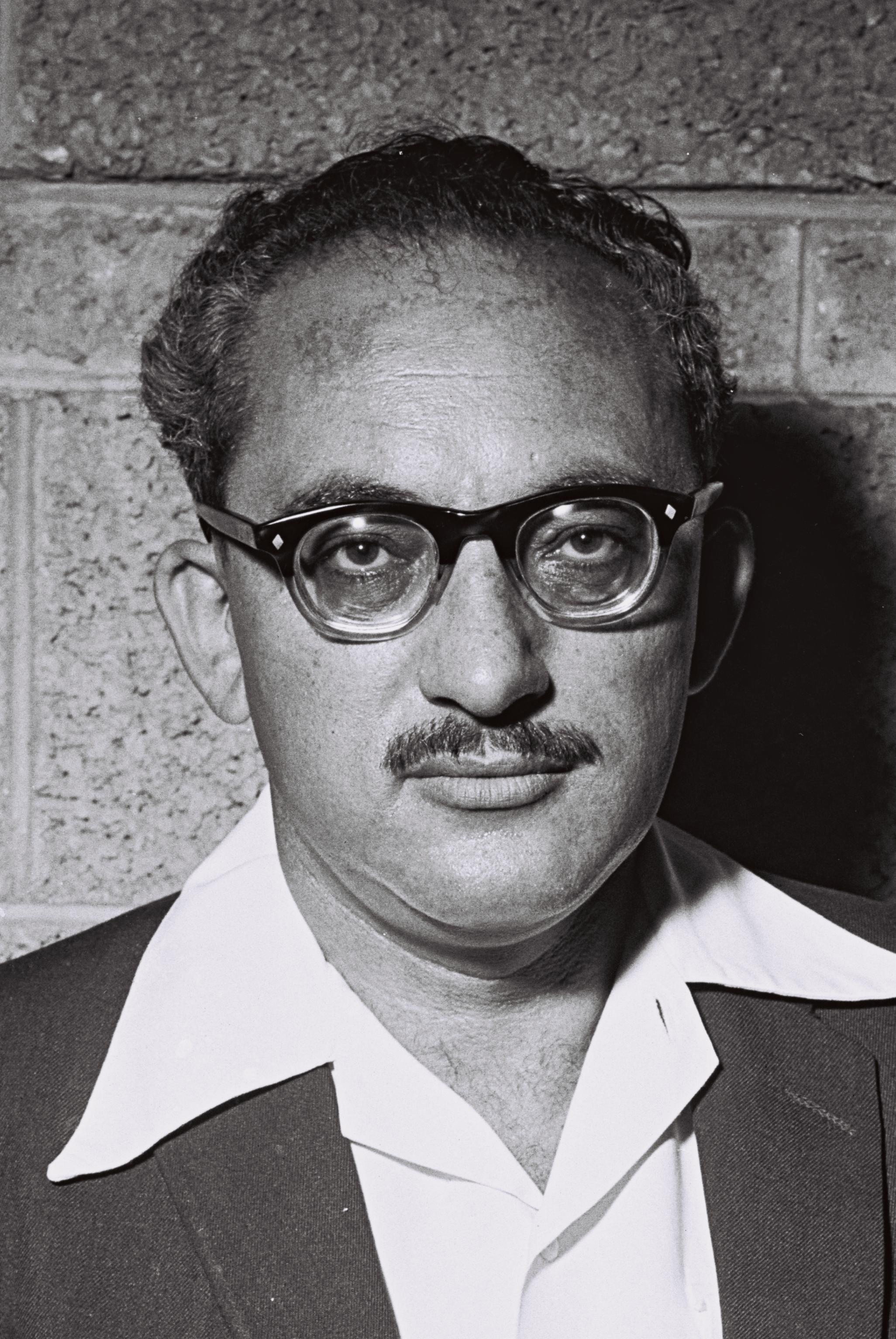
- Drori in 1954

Faction represented in the Knesset
- 1961–1964: Herut

Personal details
- Born: 23 May 1919; Łódź, Poland
- Died: 20 August 1964 (aged 45)

Avraham Rafael Drori (Hebrew: אברהם רפאל דרורי; 23 May 1919 – 20 August 1964) was an Israeli politician who served as a member of the Knesset for Herut between 1961 and 1964.

== Biography ==
Born Abram Kozinski in Łódź in Poland, Drori was a member of the Betar youth movement. He made aliyah to Mandatory Palestine in 1935, and was a member of the Betar enlistment units in Samaria and the Galilee. He joined the Irgun, and was later co-opted into the IDF, from which he was demobilised with the rank of major.

He joined Herut, and later became its general secretary. He was on the party's list for the 1959 elections, but was not placed high enough on the list to win a seat. However, he entered the Knesset on 21 March 1961 as a replacement for the deceased Shimshon Unichman. He retained his seat in the November 1961 elections, but died in office in August 1964 at the age of 45. His seat was taken by Yosef Kremerman.
