= Dalit Stauber =

Israeli educator (born 1959)

- דלית שטאובר
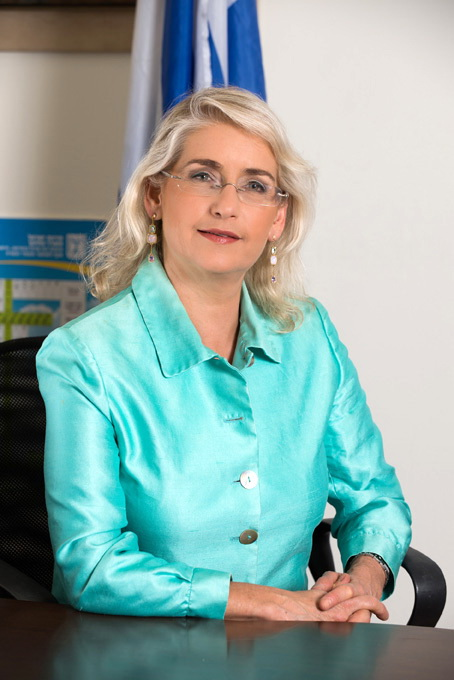
- Born: June 6, 1959 (age 67); Tel Aviv, Israel

Dalit Stauber (Hebrew: דלית שטאובר; born June 6, 1959) is an Israeli educator who has served as Director General of the Ministry of Education since 2021. She also served in the position from 2011 to 2013.

== Biography ==
Stauber was born in Tel Aviv to working-class parents, her mother, Hadassah Pilater, was a kindergarten teacher and her father, Itcho (Yitzhak), was one of the founders of the rescue sector in Israel, she has two brothers.

Stauber was educated in H Municipal high school (Ironi He High School) in Tel Aviv. In 1996 she received a Master degree with distinction in education from Bar-Ilan University and in 1980 completed her bachelor's degree in English literature and Linguistics at Bar-Ilan University.

Stauber is a graduate from the Mandel School for Educational Leadership within the Ministry of Education's senior officials program, as well as from the ELKA program for senior officials of the public service. She married Dov Yosef at the age of 18. They bore 3 children and live in Ramat HaSharon.

== Professional life ==
From 1980 to 2000, Stauber served in various managerial, training and educational positions within the framework of the formal and informal education system, including the management of the higher education school for Instructional personnel and the Alon high school in Ramat HaSharon, Stauber also served as a form tutor and a curricula coordinator at the H Municipal high school in Tel-Aviv.

Between the years 2000–2009 she was appointed superintendent of schools for secondary education of the Tel Aviv District and led the venture "Managers Initiate Future" and became one of the initiators and leaders of the "City Team" building. In the years 2009–2011 she was appointed as Director of the Tel Aviv District in the Ministry of Education and conducted the process of "data based work in the education systems". In 2011, and concurrently with her function as Director of the Tel Aviv District, she served as acting Director of the Israeli Educational Television and directed the process of ending the labor dispute of the Educational Television's workers.

Parallel to her professional functions, Stauber fulfilled and continues to fulfill a number of public functions, such as: chair of the Stauber committee for the advancement of women in the state service, chair of the executive committee of ORT braude Academic College, Representative of the Ministry of Education's in the UN Cedaw Inter-Ministerial Committee of the State of Israel Member of the Inter-Ministerial Committee for determining the status of illegal aliens' children in Israel on behalf of the Ministry of Education, Member of the Board of "Rimon School of Music", Member of the Board of Yad Vashem, Member of the advisory forum for IDF's Chief Education Officer, Member of the International Advisory Assembly of the Trump Foundation, Member of the Executive Committee of "Empowerment Center for the Citizen", Member of the Executive Committee of "MadaTech" (ScienceTech), Member of the Executive Committee of Beit Berl Academic College, Member of the inter-ministerial team for the formulation of a strategy to open reserves of human capital for the public service, and a member of the codes of ethics drafting for state employees.

== General Director of the Ministry of education ==
In 2011 Stauber was appointed to the position of Director General of the Ministry of Education by the then Minister of Education, Gideon Saar, and in October 2011, replaced Dr. Shimshon Shoshani. During her term in office, she took part, among others, in the implementation of the education chapter in Trachtenberg's Reform, the completion of the implementation of the Teachers' Union reform "New Horizon", The implementation of "Courage for Change" and the positioning and validation of collaborations with the third sector. During her term, many changes came into effect within the educational system and a strategy was designed to adapt the education system to the 21st century. In September 2013, Stauber requested to conclude her duty as Director General of the Ministry of Education and in late October she was replaced by Michal Cohen.

== Awards and honors ==
- In 2004, Stauber received a certificate of appreciation for outstanding City team leader on behalf of Mrs. Orly Froman, Director of the Tel Aviv district.
- In 2005 she was nominated as Outstanding Employee and was awarded the Ministry of Education's Director General Prize.
- In 2006, she received the Outstanding Employee Award named after Noah Mozes.
- In 2008 Stauber shared the Education Award of the city of Tel-Aviv-Jaffa on behalf of the Ministry of Education.
- In 2014 she received an honor decoration on behalf of "Ometz" movement for a special contribution to the community and to society
