= Yosef Tamir =

Israeli journalist & politician (1915–2009)

- יוסף תמיר
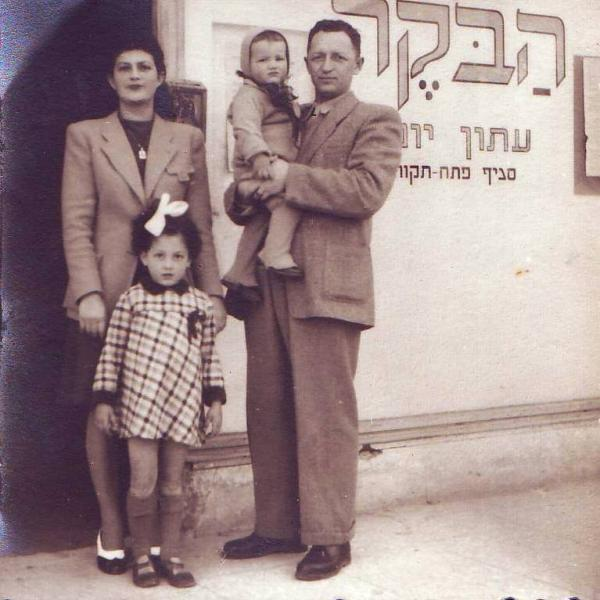

Faction represented in the Knesset
- 1965–1974: Gahal
- 1974–1979: Likud
- 1979–1981: Shinui
- 1981: Independent

Personal details
- Born: 5 March 1915 Berdychiv, Russian Empire
- Died: 10 August 2009 (aged 94)

Yosef Tamir
Medal record

Maccabiah Games
Bronze medal – third place	1932 Israel	200 m
Bronze medal – third place	1932 Israel	400 m
Bronze medal – third place	1932 Israel	Javelin Throw

Yosef Tamir (Hebrew: יוסף תמיר; 5 March 1915 – 10 August 2009) was an Israeli journalist, politician, lawyer and a professional javelin thrower.

== Background ==
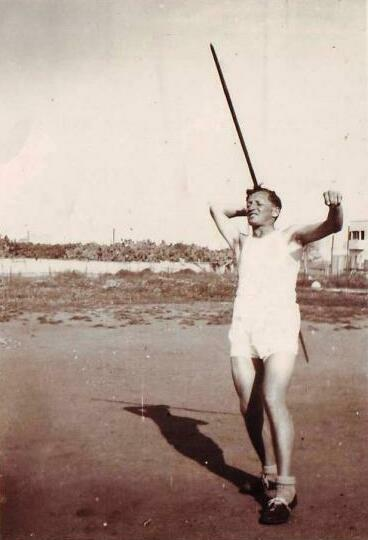
Yossef Tamir practicing javelin throwing as the champion of British Mandate Palestine in this field.

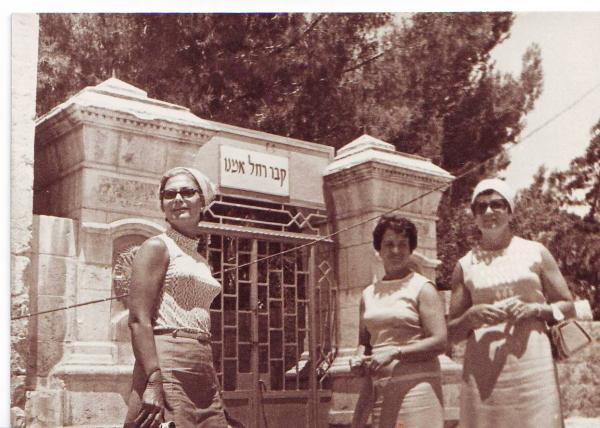
The family of MK Yosef Tamir visiting the Rachel's tomb, immediately after the Six-Day War in 1967

Tamir was born in Berdychiv in the Russian Empire (now part of Ukraine) and immigrated to Mandatory Palestine in 1924. He passed through elementary and high school in Petah Tikva and graduated from the Law and Economics School at Tel Aviv University.

Between 1935 and 1945 he worked as a journalist for Haaretz, the Palestine Post, Yedioth Ahronoth, Maariv and HaBoker, and was a military correspondent during the 1948 Arab-Israeli War. He was a member of the Maccabi Sports Movement, and won three bronze medals in the Maccabiah Games.

== Political career ==
Tamir joined the General Zionists party, and became its general secretary. Between 1965 and 1969 he was a member of the Tel Aviv directorate as head of the Liberal Party faction (a merger of the General Zionists and the Progressive Party). In the 1965 elections Tamir was also elected to the Knesset as member of Gahal, an alliance of the Liberal Party and Herut. Yosef retained his seat in the 1969 election, and again in the 1973 election, before which Gahal had become Likud.

After being elected to the Knesset for Likud again in the 1977 election, Tamir broke away from the party and joined the newly formed Shinui, a centrist liberal party. However, he soon left his new party and spent the rest of the Knesset session as an independent MK. He was not returned to the Knesset in the 1981 elections.

== Environmental activism ==
During his lifetime Tamir founded several environmental organisations:

- Council for a Beautiful Israel (1968)
- Non-factional Committee for Ecology (1970)
- Life and Environment Organization (1975)
- Israel Economic Forum on the Environment (1991)

He also launched the environmental journal Green Blue and White.

Tamir represented the Knesset at the First United Nations Conference on the Environment of Man in Stockholm in 1972, and was the Likud representative in the Knesset delegation that visited the United States Congress in 1975 and the German Bundestag in 1977.

Tamir won several prizes for his environmental activism, including the United Nations Environmental Prize and a Knesset Prize for "Achievements in the Area of Environmental Quality".
