= Abba Elhanani =

Israeli architect

- Born: 1918; Warsaw
- Died: 2008 (aged 89–90); Israel
- Education: Technion - Faculty of architecture and town planning
- Occupations: architecture, design journal editor, critic, and historian
- Buildings: Beit HaNassi
- Design: Beit HaNassi

Abba Elhanani, (Hebrew: אבא אלחנני, January 26, 1918 – July 2, 2008) was an Israeli architect, architecture and design journal editor, critic, and historian of Israeli architecture. His designs include that of Israel's Presidential residence in Jerusalem and Kikar HaMednia in Tel Aviv.

== Biography ==
Elhanani (originally Elchanowicz) was born in Warsaw, the capital of the Second Polish Republic in 1918, and immigrated to Mandatory Palestine with his parents and two brothers on January 2, 1933. He was a graduate of the Herzliya Hebrew Gymnasium. He completed his architectural studies at the Technion – Israel Institute of Technology in Haifa in 1941. He was a member of the "Haganah" organization, and later served as an IDF soldier in the 1948 Arab–Israeli War. In 1947 he opened an architecture firm with a partner who was a civil engineer. In 1948 he headed the national committee for the selection of the Flag of Israel.

In 1956, together with Saadia Mendel, he won third place in a competition to mark historic sites.

Elhanani is considered one of Israel's most prominent architects due to his contributions to building in the country, his work teaching at the Technion, and his editorial work in architectural journals, most notably Toya, which he edited from 1966 to 1992, and his book The Struggle for Independence of Israeli Architecture in the 20th Century.

His son, was killed in the Yom Kippur War in battles on the Golan Heights while serving in the reconnaissance unit of Golani. The family commemorates him through "Ohel Ehud", a memorial tent erected at the Ramat Gan scout house, and through a scholarship for outstanding students at the Bezalel Academy of Arts and Design. In 2006, Elhanani was awarded the title of "Honorary Citizen" of Ramat Gan, the city in which he resided.

He died on July 2, 2008, and left behind his wife, architect Hannah Elhanani, and daughter, Idit Elhanani. His rich library was donated to the "House of the Architect", and alongside its inauguration an exhibition of his works was curated by Tsvi Elhyani.

== Selected works ==
- President's Residence, Jerusalem, 1971
- Kikar HaMedina, He Be’iyar St., Tel Aviv (in collaboration with Oscar Niemeyer and Israel Lotan)
- Monument to fallen airmen in Independence Park, Tel Aviv (in collaboration with Binyamin Tammuz)
- Histadrut House named after Philip Murray, Eilat, 1956 (with Hannah Elhanani)
- Housing for evacuees from Nordia neighborhood, Tel Aviv, 1959 (with Israel Lotan and Ben Zion Shilamber)
- Beit HaAm (Community House), Kfar Shmuel, 1969
- Two residential towers in Ramat Aviv, Recanati St.
- Tirat Carmel Mental Health Center
- The Armenian Theological Seminary, Jerusalem
- Mamram Base, Ramat Gan
- Residential towers in Ramat Ilan, Givat Shmuel
- Housing in Ashkelon

== Gallery ==
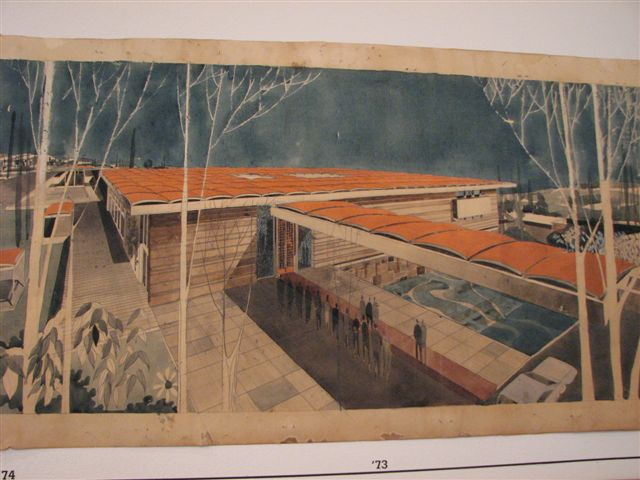
Perspective drawing of the President's Residence, 1960s

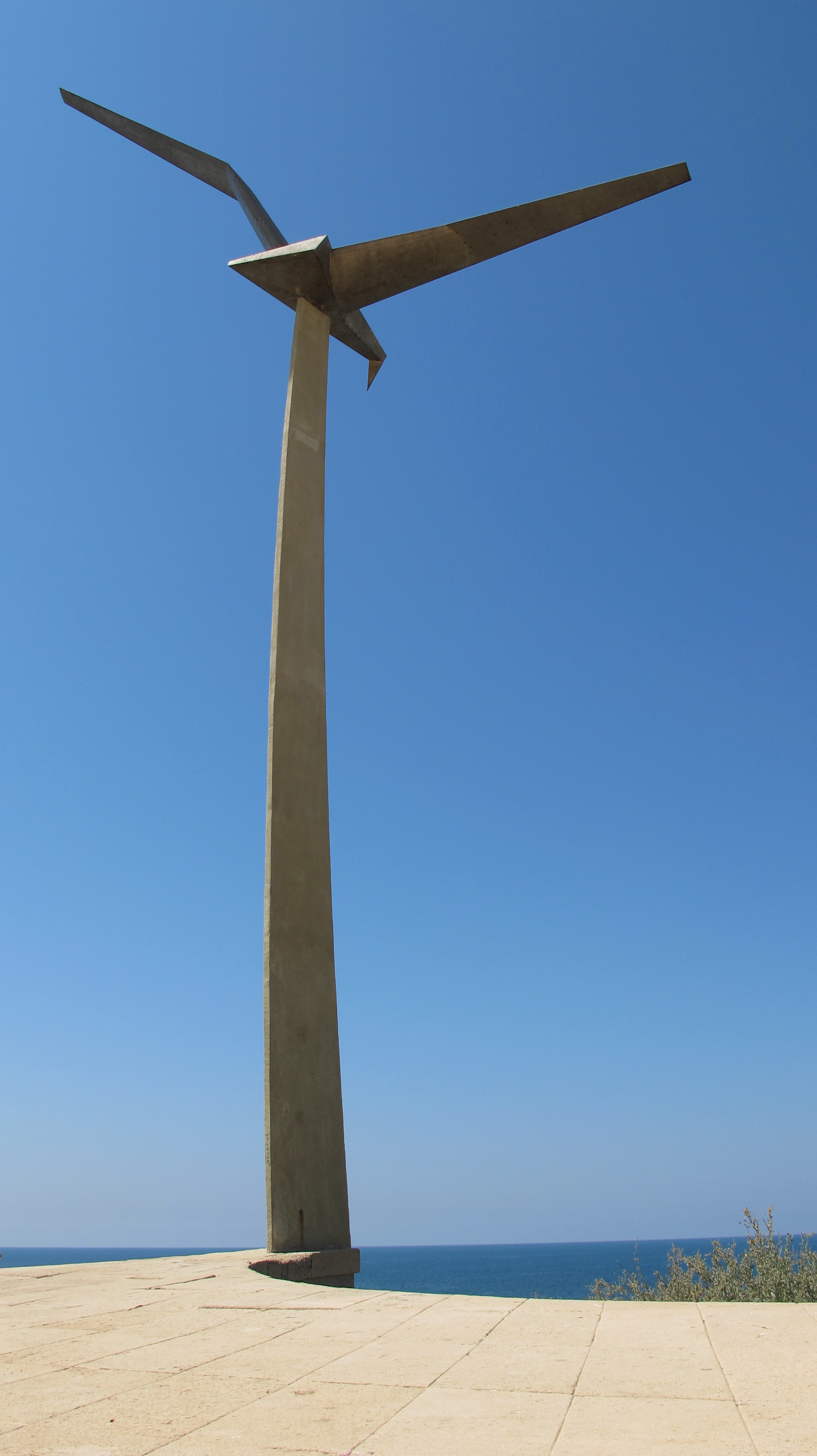
Monument to fallen airmen off the coast of Tel Aviv

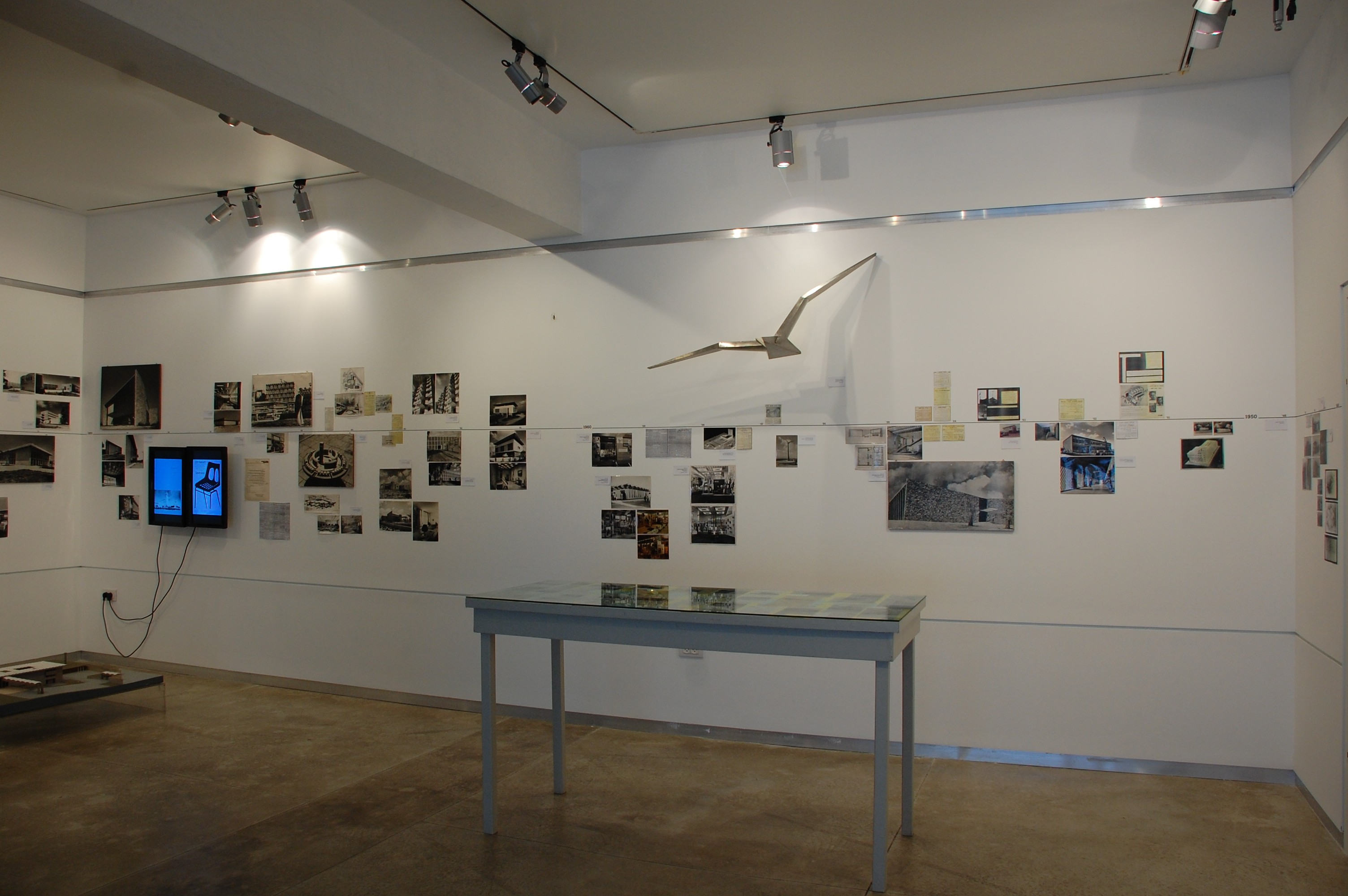
View of the “Toya Line” exhibition on the work of architect and critic Abba Elhanani, Architects’ Association Gallery, Sept. 2009

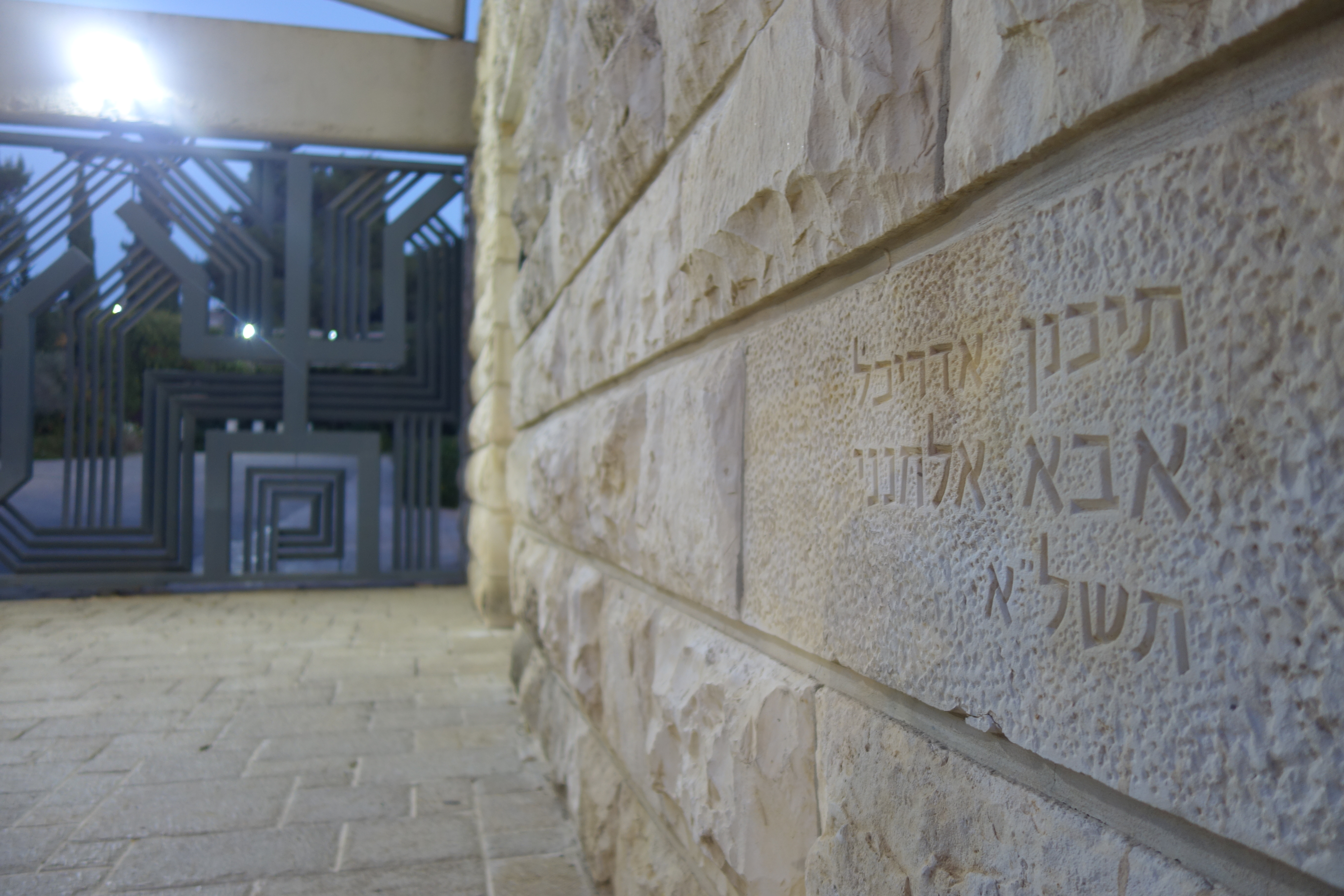
Signature of the architect at the entrance to the President's Residence

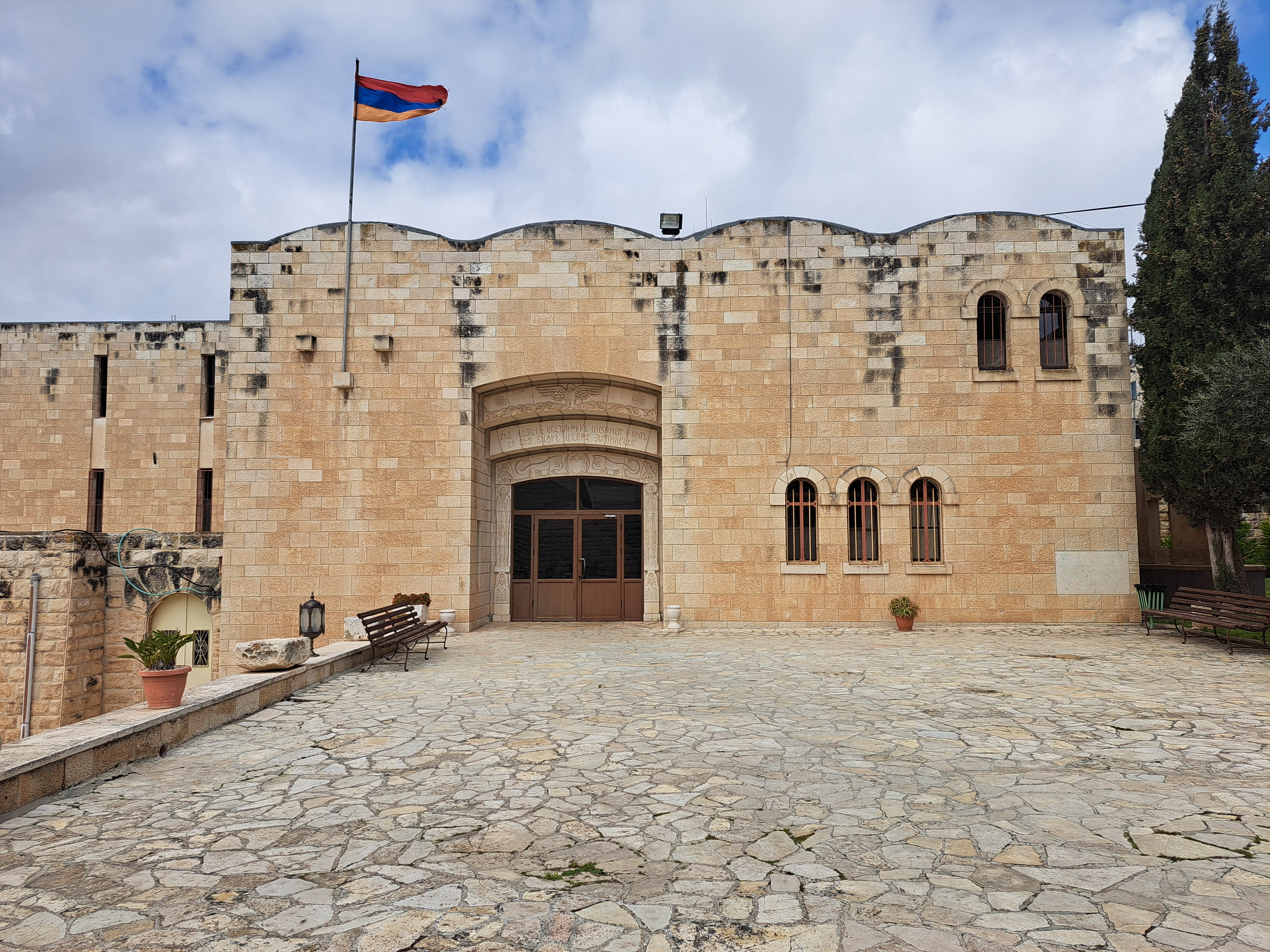
Administrative wing of the Armenian Theological Seminary in the Armenian Quarter of Jerusalem

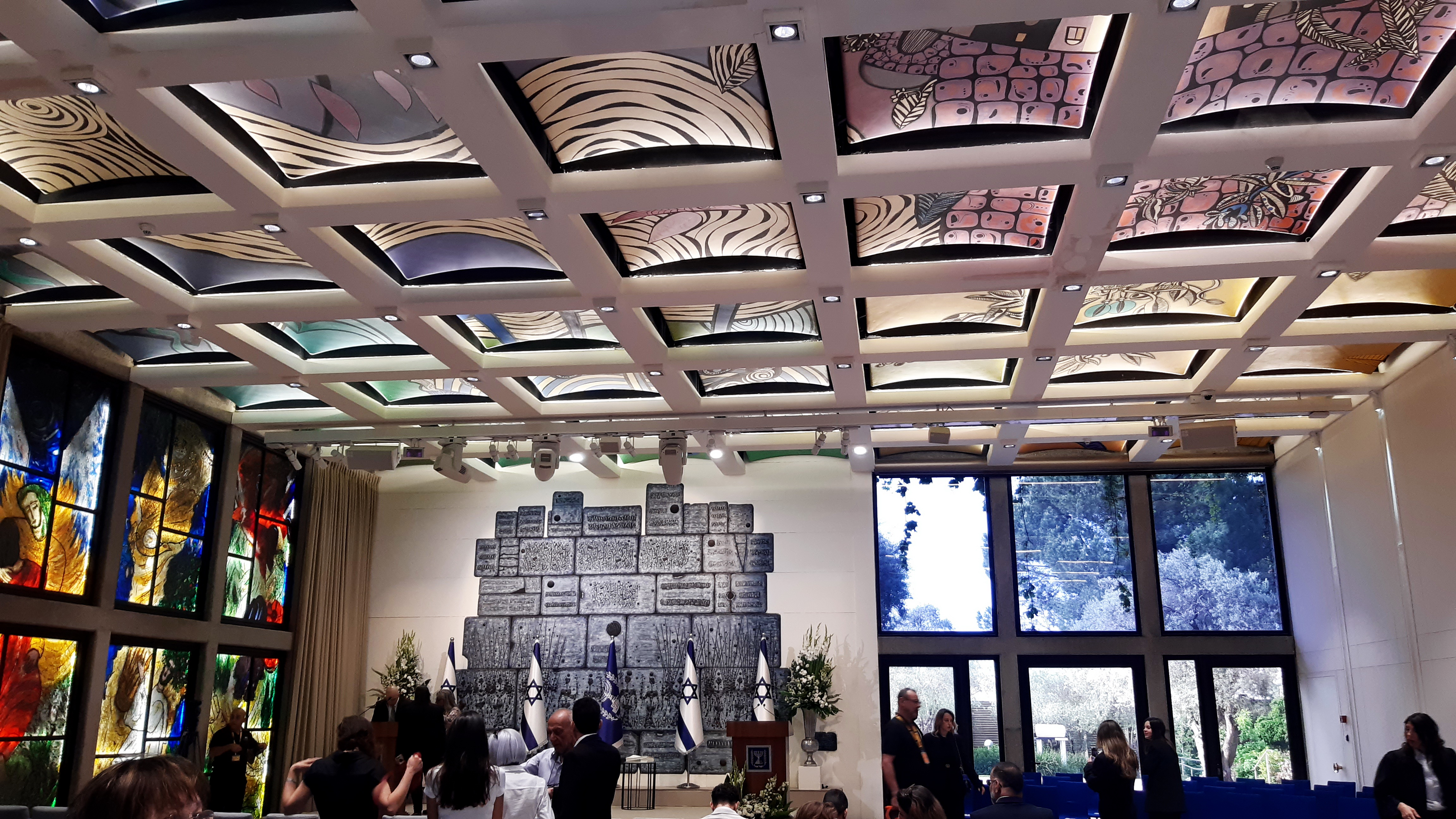
Beit HaNassi, inside are various pieces of Israeli artwork including by Moshe Castel, Shraga Weil and others.

== Books ==
- Architecture as Art and Science, IDF Education and Culture Corps, Galei Tzahal, Ministry of Defense – Publishing House (series: University on Air), 1982.
- The Struggle for Independence of Israeli Architecture in the 20th Century, Ministry of Defense – Publishing House, 1998.

== See also ==
- Architecture in Israel
