= Beit HaNassi =

Official residence of the President of Israel

Coordinates: 31°46′11″N 35°12′51″E

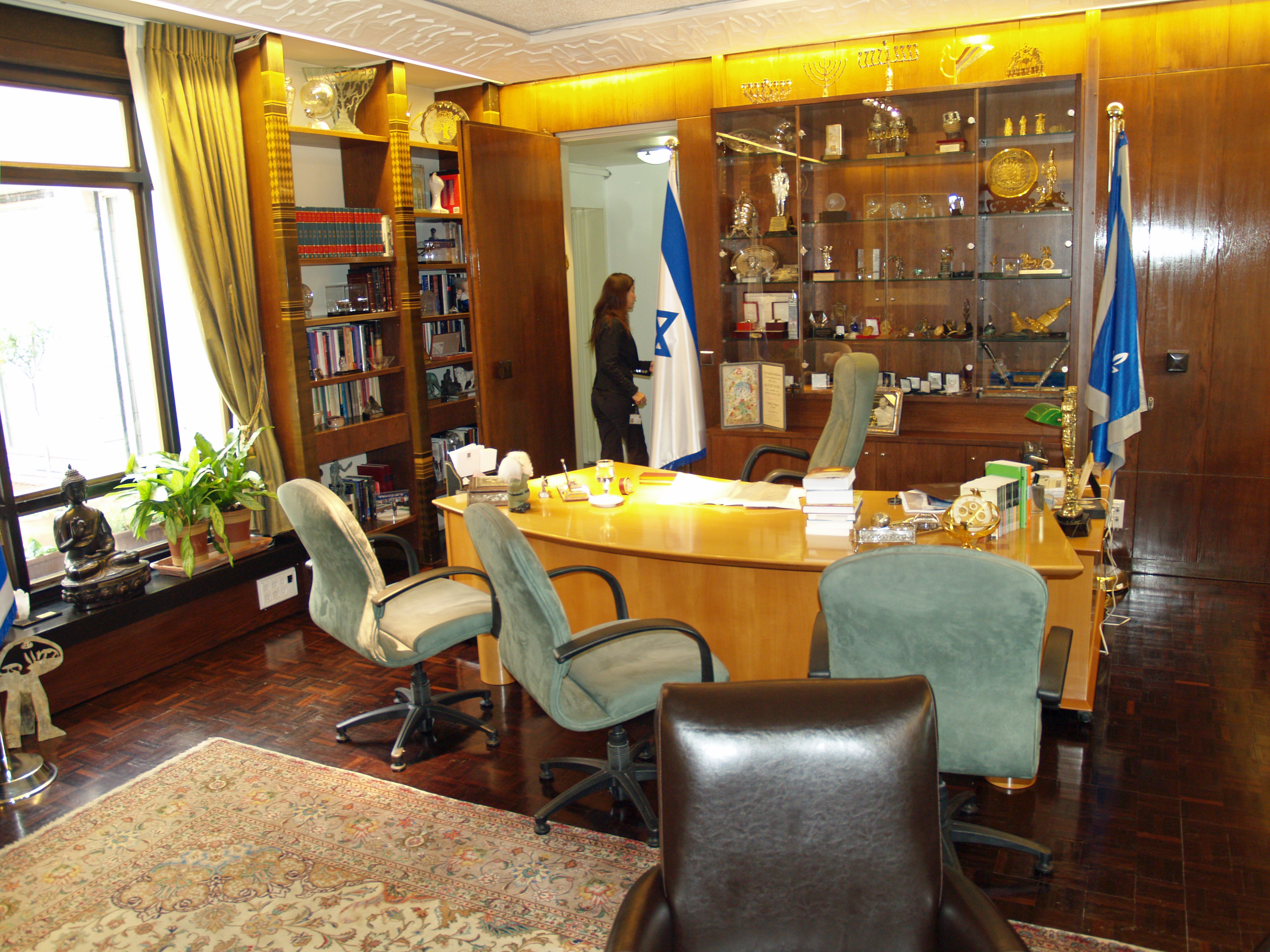
- Top: The office of the President (2007)

- Location within Israel

General information
- Location: 3 HaNassi Boulevard, Jerusalem
- Current tenants: Isaac Herzog, President of Israel and First family
- Beit HaNassi

The President's House, known in Hebrew as Beit HaNassi (בֵּית הַנָּשִׂיא) and Mishkan HaNassi (מִשְׁכָּן הַנָּשִׂיא), is the official residence of the president of Israel. It is located in the Talbiya neighborhood of Jerusalem.

== Etymology ==
In Modern Hebrew, beit means house, mishkan residence, and nasi president, the last being derived from the Biblical Hebrew word for prince. Ha is the Hebrew definite article.

== History ==
Before Beit HaNassi was built, President Chaim Weizmann lived in Rehovot in his own villa. Yitzhak Ben-Zvi used a cabin in Rehavia for his presidential duties while living in a regular apartment.

In 1963, a plan to build a residence for the incoming president, Zalman Shazar, was started. During Shazar's presidency, he declined the offer to have the future residence built as part of existing political buildings. As a result, the construction of a house in Talbiya was approved, to be built on a ten-dunam plot. In 1964, architect Aba Elhanani won the contest for the residence design. Beit HaNassi was inaugurated in 1971 by President Shazar. The design came under harsh criticism from different public figures.

During the visit to Israel of Pope Benedict XVI in 2009, President Shimon Peres inaugurated a new custom that all visiting world leaders would plant an olive tree in the Beit HaNassi "peace garden".

In October 2017, work was completed on a new, enlarged entrance to Beit Hanassi to enable faster processing of visitors to major events at the residence.

== Artwork ==
The President's residence includes various pieces of artwork. These include the wall of praise to Jerusalem by Moshe Castel, who used crushed volcanic ash (basalt) to produce the relief. There are also stained windows made by Reuben Rubin, murals by Naftali Bezem and a doorway crafted by Shraga Weil.

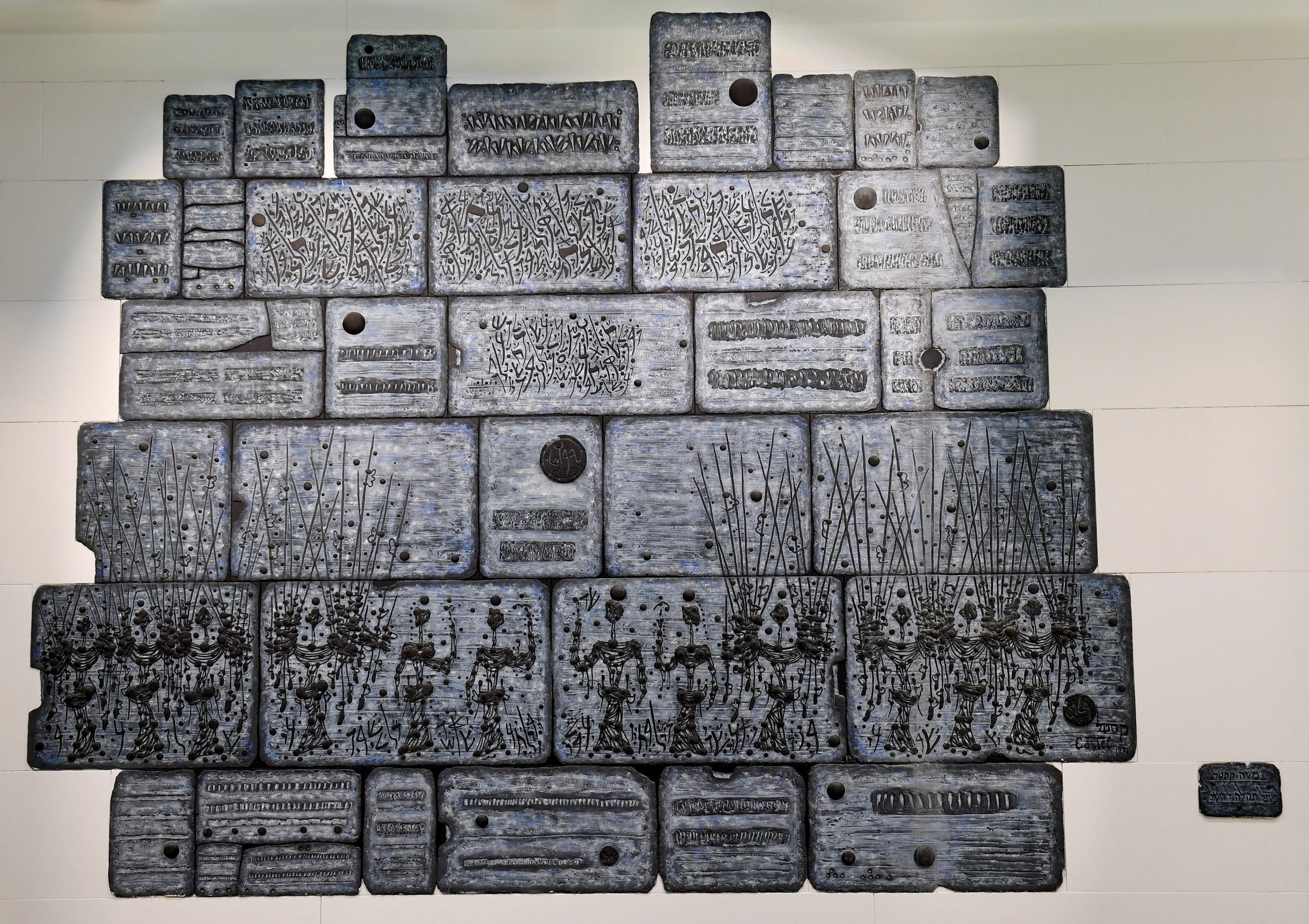
Wall of Praise to Jerusalem, 1970. A Relief by Moshe Castel.

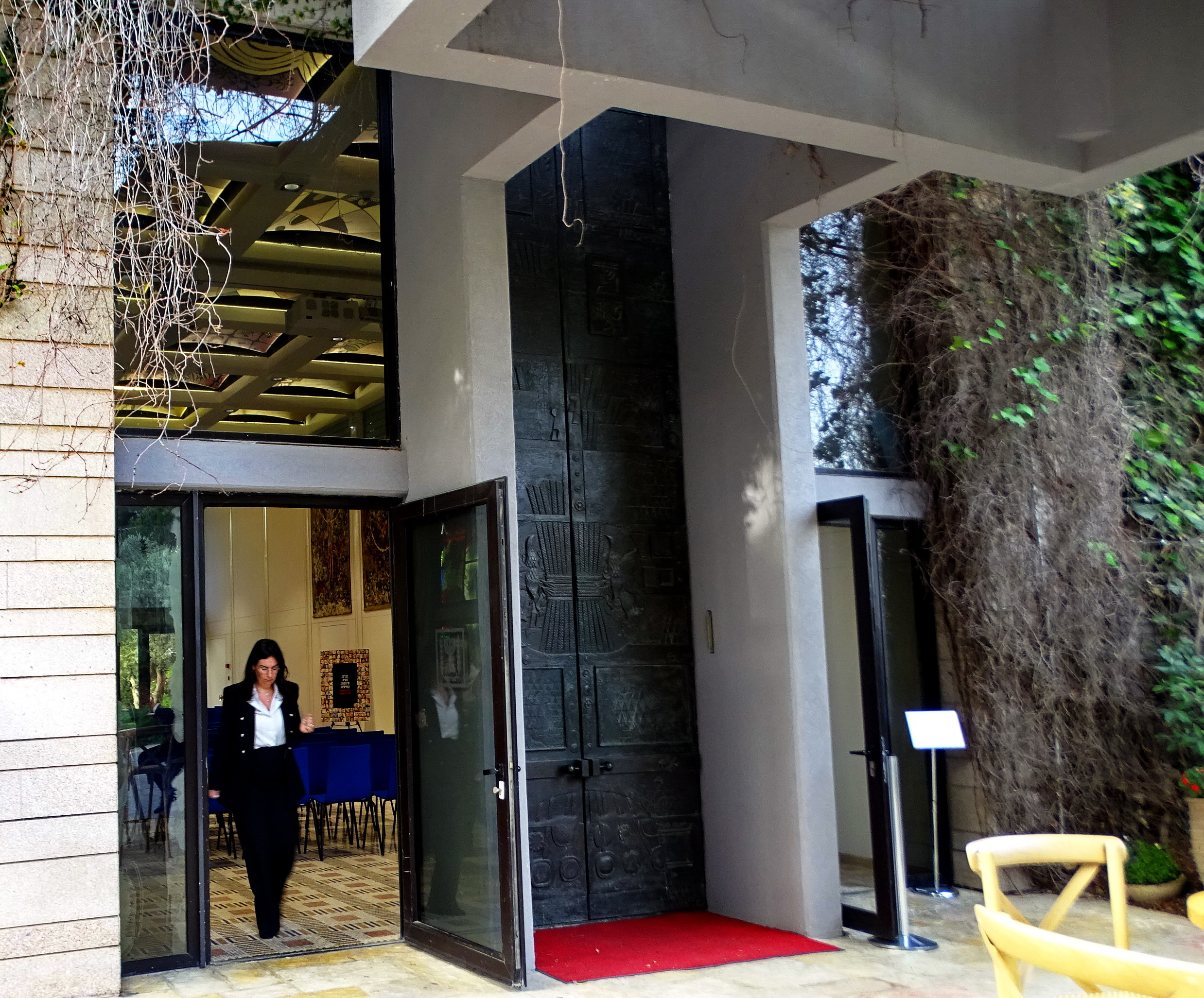
Doorway by Shraga Weil

== Gallery ==
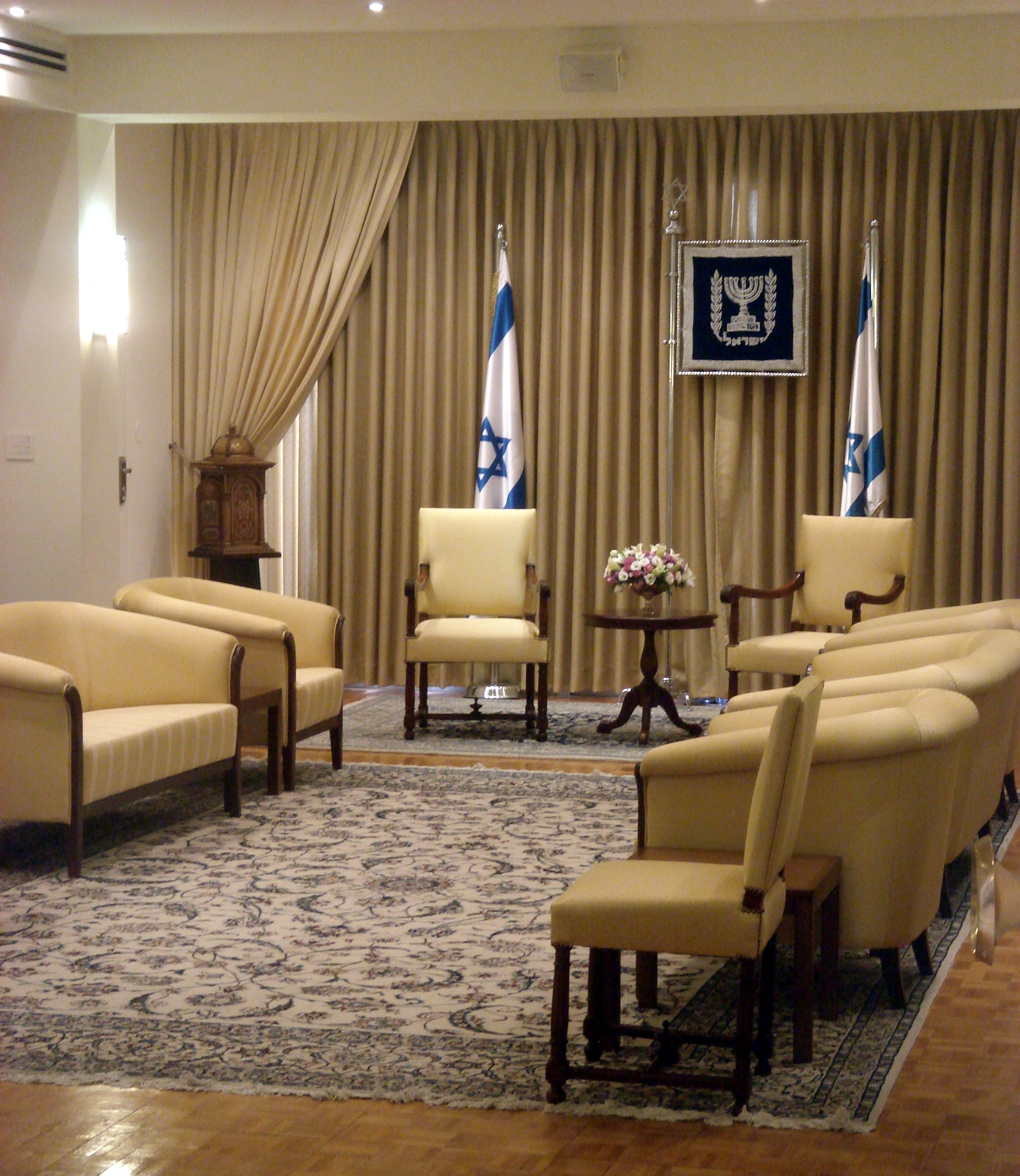
Meeting room in 2008

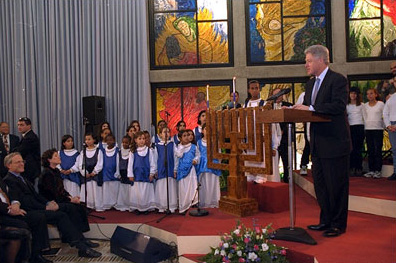
U.S. President Clinton at menorah lighting ceremony at Beit HaNassi, 1998

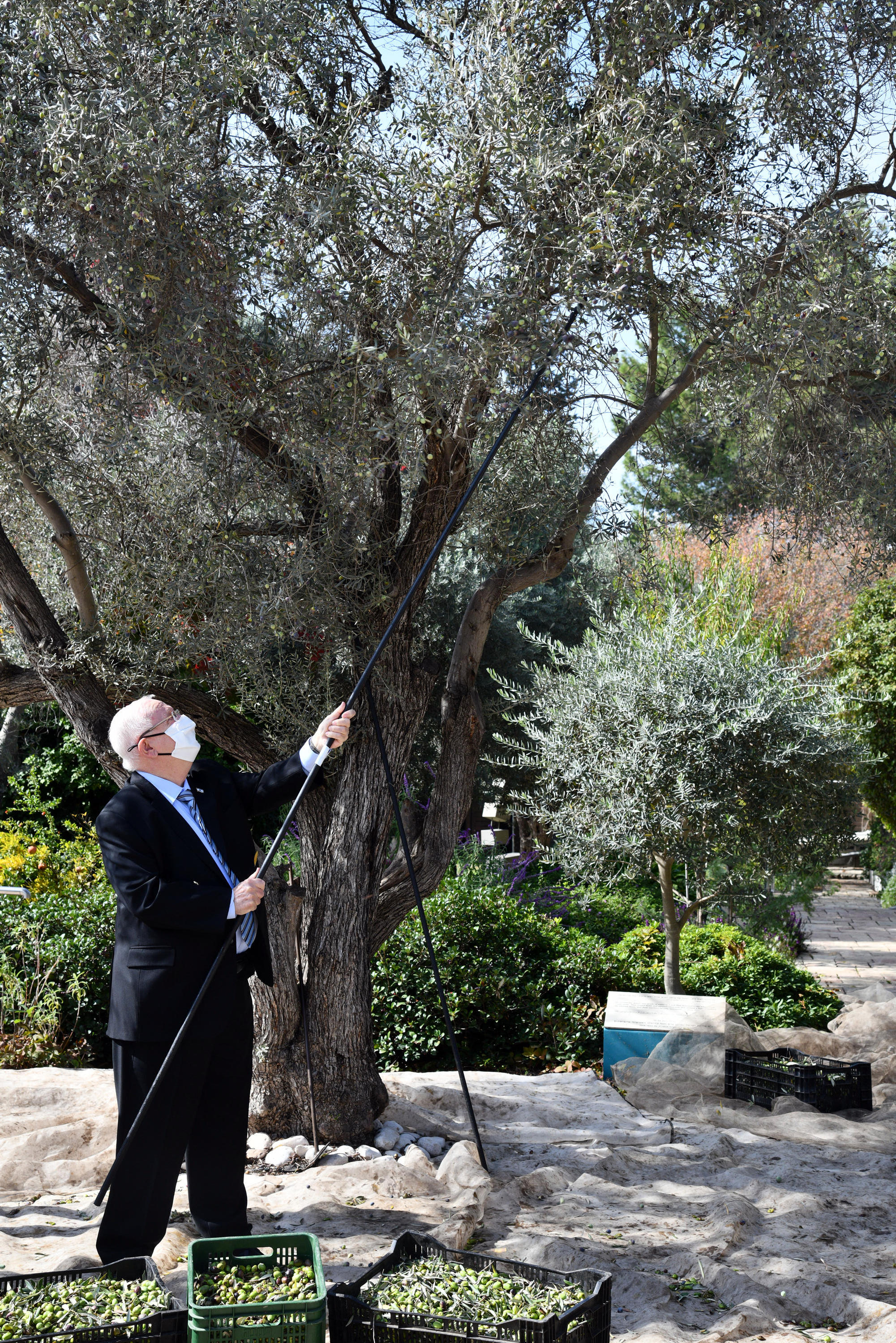
Israeli President Reuven Rivlin in the annual olive harvest in the garden of Beit HaNassi, November 2020
