= Shraga Weil =

Israeli painter (1918–2009)

Shrage Weil שרגא ווייל
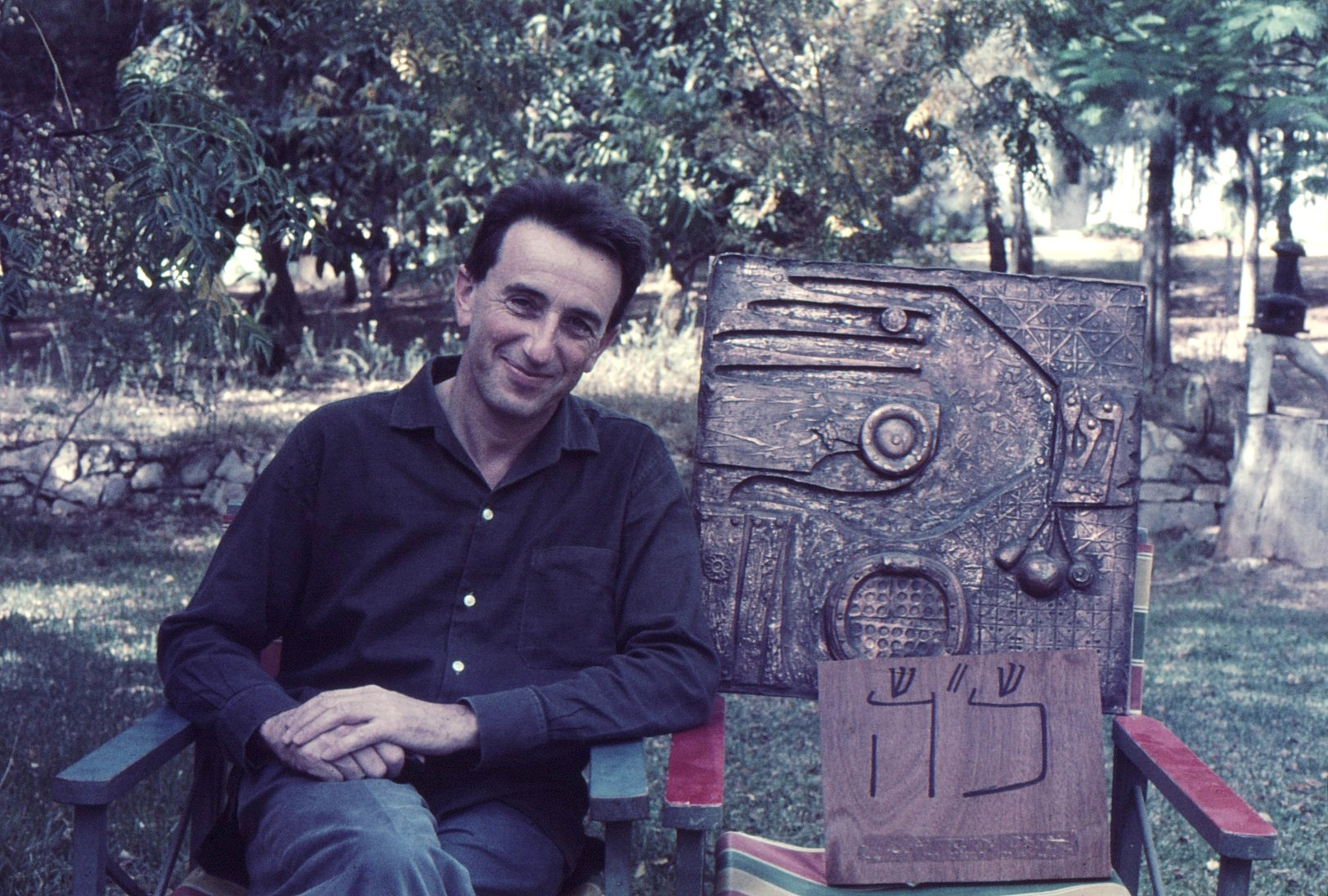
- Born: František Ferdinand Weil; September 24, 1918; Nyitra, Austria-Hungary
- Died: February 20, 2009 (aged 90); Israel
- Education: Academy of Fine Arts in Prague, Academie des Beaux Arts in Paris
- Known for: Painting, Graphics, Printmaking
- Movement: Modern
- Awards: Dizengoff Prize (1959)

Shraga Weil (Hebrew: שרגא ווייל; September 24, 1918 – February 20, 2009) was an Israeli painter.

== Biography ==
Weil was born as František Ferdinand Weil in Nyitra, Austria-Hungary (today Nitra, Slovakia) in 1918 to a family of teachers, journalists and merchants. His father was a building engineer. He was sent to study with a local sculptor, and then to the Academy of Fine Arts in Prague. He produced his first graphic works during World War II, during which he spent as a prisoner. After the War, he sailed for Mandatory Palestine on an illegal immigrant ship. He arrived in Mandatory Palestine in 1947 and became a member of Kibbutz HaOgen, where he lived until his death.

In 1954, he studied murals and graphic techniques at the Ecole des Beaux-Arts, Paris. He also studied mosaics in Ravenna with Professor Severini.

Weil died on February 20, 2009.

== Work ==
Weil's works have been exhibited in the United States, South America, Canada, Australia, France, Slovakia, the USSR, Switzerland, and in the International Exhibition of Graphic Arts, in Lugano.

His style was influence by socialist art, which according to the Israel Museum was more widely embraced by the Kibbutz movement. His work includes the door of the Israeli president's residence as well as ceramic reliefs at Tel Aviv's Great Synagogue.

Weil's artwork is in the permanent collections of Brandeis University, Waltham, Massachusetts, Israel Museum, Jerusalem, Fogg Museum, Harvard University, Los Angeles County Museum, Jewish Museum, New York, Philadelphia Museum of Art, Joslyn Museum, Omaha, Nebraska, Judah Magnes Museum, Berkeley, CA, as well as others.

== Awards ==
In 1959, Weil was awarded the Dizengoff Prize for Painting.

== Gallery ==
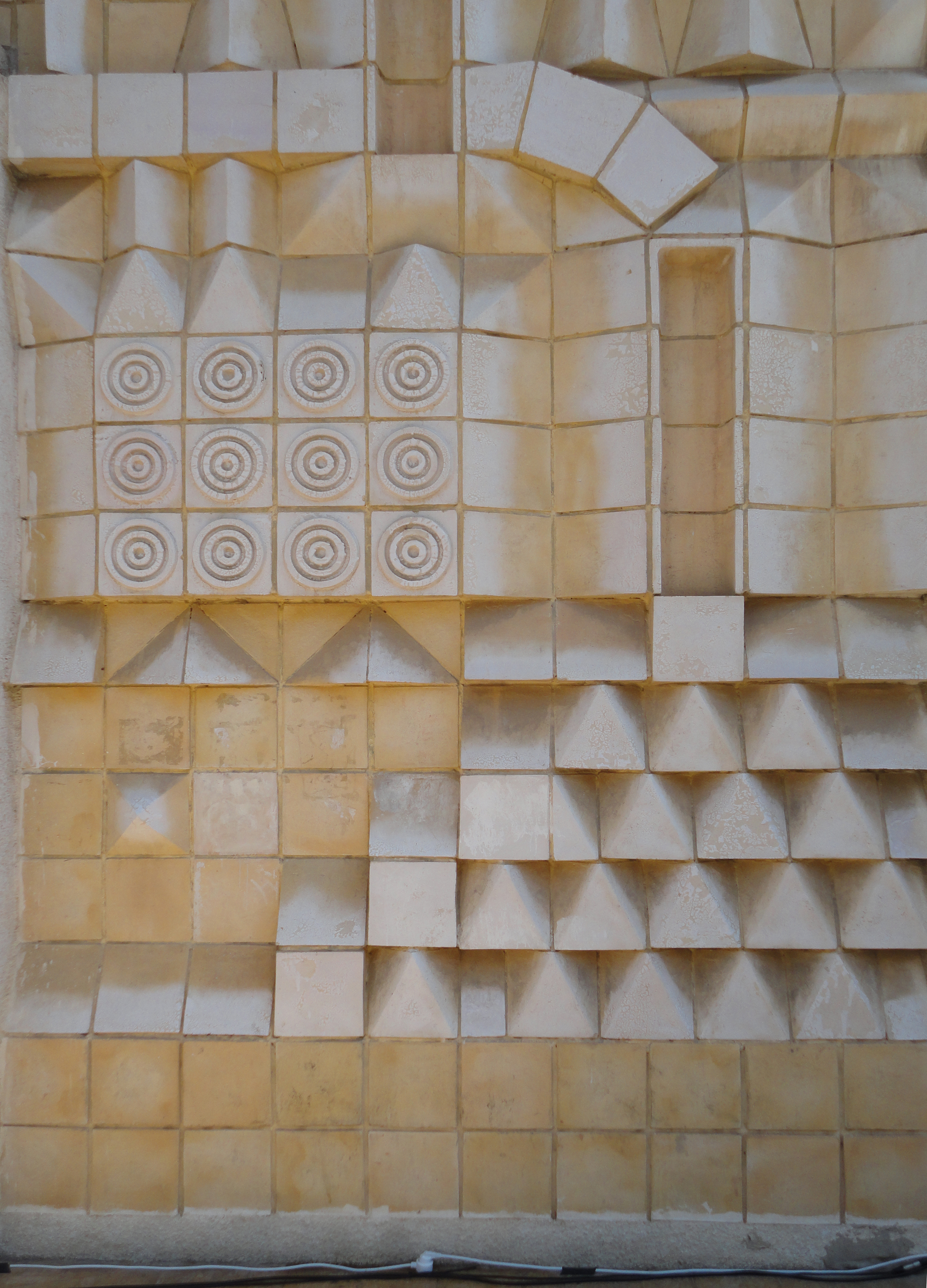
Ceramic Relief at the Tel-Aviv's Great Synagogue.

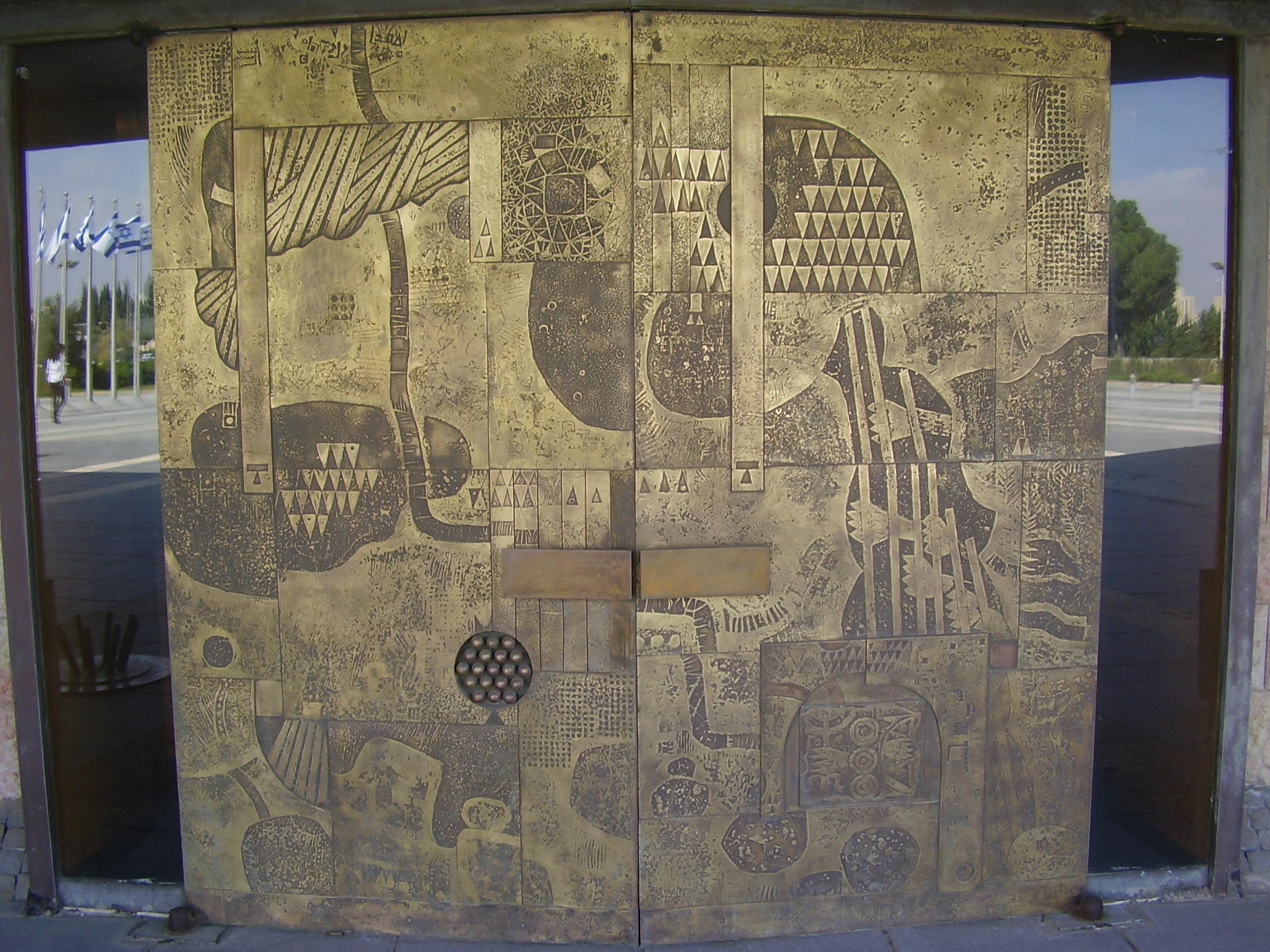
Door at the Knesset
