= Herut (newspaper) =

- Owner(s): Irgun; Herut
- Founded: 1909 (Jerusalem edition); 1942 (Irgun edition); 1948 (Herut edition)
- Ceased publication: 1948 (Irgun version); 1965 (Herut version)
- Language: Hebrew

Herut (Hebrew: חרות, lit. 'Freedom') was the name of four newspapers published in Palestine and later Israel. The first was established in Jerusalem during the Ottoman era, two were journals of the Irgun, whilst the fourth was owned by the Herut political party founded by former Irgun members.

== Jerusalem newspaper ==
In 1909 a weekly newspaper by the name of Ha-Herut was established in 1909 by Avraham Elmalih, later a member of the Knesset for the Sephardim and Oriental Communities party. Initially edited by Haim Ben-Atar, it was considered to be the mouthpiece of the city's Sephardi community. It became a daily newspaper in 1912, and was edited by Elmalih between 1914 and 1919, being the only Hebrew newspaper to appear regularly during World War I.

== Irgun newspaper ==
Herut was established as the journal of the Irgun in 1942, with its first edition published on 10 March that year. It was published at least once a month on four pages, and was sent by mail to private addresses, as well as being pasted on walls in public areas. The paper took a Revisionist slant on problems in the yishuv, but also included coded messages to members of the Irgun underground. For that reason, the British authorities followed the newspaper closely, with a full English translation sent to the Foreign Secretary in November 1943.

The ninety-ninth and last edition of the paper was published on 10 June 1948, though publication of a separate Herut journal continued in Jerusalem during June and July that year, with the city cut off from the rest of the country by the siege and the local Irgun not having been absorbed into the IDF.

== Herut daily ==
In 1948 a new daily newspaper associated with the Herut party (with which it shared its name) was launched by former journalists of HaMashkif, the Hatzohar-affiliated newspaper, including Izik Ramba, who was its editor from 1957 onwards. Its journalists included Yoel Marcus, Dan Margalit, Eitan Haber, Shlomo Nakdimon, Ze'ev Galili, Amos Keinan, Uzi Benziman, Eliyahu Matza, Dan Levin, Aryeh Naor and Moshe Katsav. Chief editors included Shmuel Merlin, a Herut Knesset member.

In 1965 the Herut party allied with the Liberal Party. The Herut newspaper was merged with the HaBoker newspaper owned by the General Zionists faction of the Liberal Party, to form HaYom, which ceased publication four years later.
