= Yitzhak Rager =

Israeli journalist, diplomat, and a Likud mayor of Beersheba

- יצחק רגר
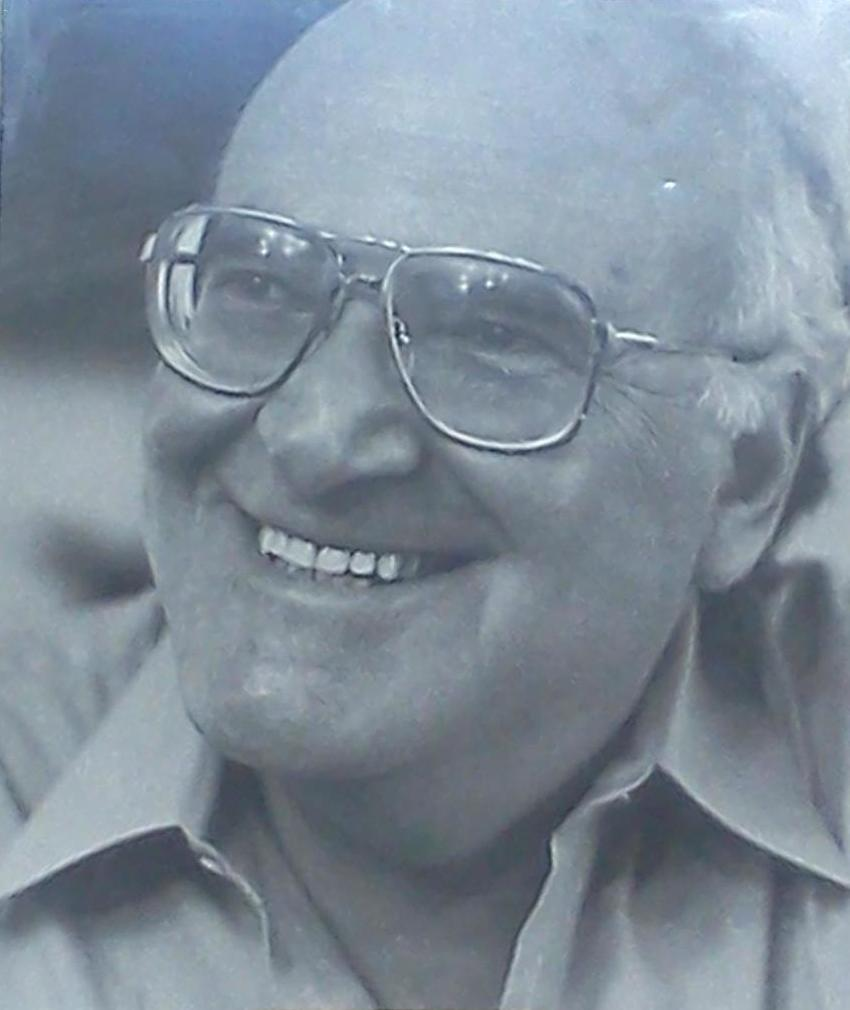
- portrait of Yitzhack Rager

5th Mayor of Beersheba
- In office 1989–1997
- Preceded by: Moshe Zilberman
- Succeeded by: David Bunfeld

Personal details
- Born: 1932 Cairo, Egypt
- Died: 1997 (aged 64–65) Beersheba, Israel
- Party: Likud

Yitzhak "Ijo" Rager (Hebrew: יצחק "איז'ו" רגר; 1932–1997) was an Israeli journalist, diplomat, and a Likud mayor of Beersheba.

Rager was born in Cairo, though immediately after his birth, his family moved to Mandate Palestine and settled in Jerusalem. In his IDF service he reached the rank of lieutenant colonel and took part in the Six-Day War.

Rager had two children: Eviatar Rager (born 1959) and Avishag Rager (born 1970), both of whom reside in Israel. After his discharge he worked in the mass media; among his posts were as European correspondent for Kol Israel, the Israeli national radio service, editor of the periodical HaYom and director-general of the Israel Broadcasting Authority. During that period, he was affiliated with the General Zionists, a centrist political party, and particularly aligned with Yitzhak Rokeach. On behalf of Israel's Foreign Service, Rager was posted to New York as a consul, where he focused on the international efforts to open the gates of emigration from the USSR for Soviet Jewry. Afterwards he was made world president of the State of Israel Bonds.

As a business entrepreneur, Rager was among the founders of Kanyon HaNegev (lit. Negev Mall), the Negev's largest commercial center and one of the group established by Canadian developer David Azrieli. Its success was the source of some conflict in Beersheba. Proponents touted the Kanyon's successful businesses and how the modernized facility offered local residents amenities comparable to the Westernized center of the country and abroad, purportedly raising their standard of living. However, the competition badly harmed the businesses of Beersheba's Old City, which have yet to recover.

Yitzhak Rager, running as the Likud party's candidate, was elected to the mayoralty in 1989. He was re-elected and served a total of eight years until his death. Through his efforts, in 1992 Beersheba was designated a prime development area, resulting in major strides in its advancement and the absorption of tens of thousands of new immigrants.

In his memory, a principal thoroughfare in Beersheba was renamed Yitzhak Rager Boulevard. It connects Ben Gurion University of the Negev, the Soroka Medical Center, the Beersheba municipality, and the Negev Mall.
