= HaBoker =

- Type: Daily newspaper
- Owner: General Zionists
- Founded: 1935
- Ceased publication: 1965
- Language: Hebrew
- Headquarters: Tel Aviv

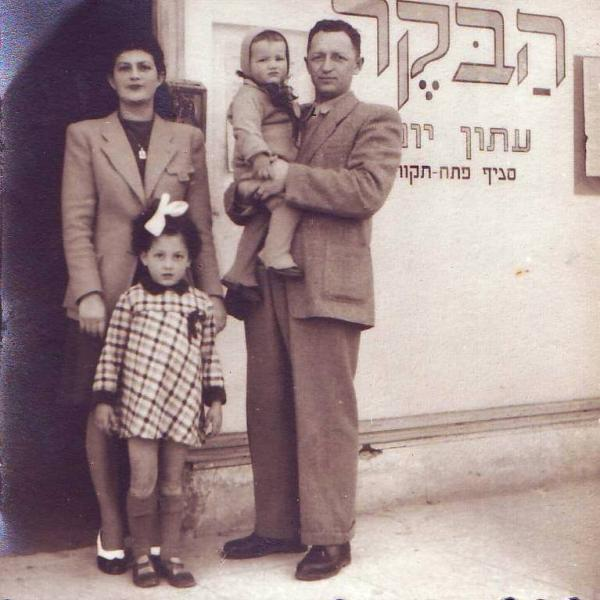
Yosef Tamir and his family at the door of the newspaper's office in Petah Tikva

HaBoker (Hebrew: הבוקר, lit. 'The Morning') was a Hebrew-language daily newspaper in Mandate Palestine and Israel associated with the General Zionists.

== History ==
The paper was established in 1935 by the right wing of the General Zionists, with the first edition published on 11 October that year. Its first editor, Samuel Perl, left soon after the newspaper's founding, and was replaced by Joseph Heftman and Peretz Bernstein, one of the signatories of the Israeli declaration of independence, who held the post until 1946. Its journalists included Yosef Tamir, a secretary of the General Zionists, and Herzl Vardi, another signatory of the declaration of independence.

The paper's circulation fell following independence, from 13,500 in 1950 to 4,000-4,500 in 1965. In 1965, following the alliance of the Liberal Party (which the General Zionists had become part of in 1961) and Herut, HaBoker was merged with the Herut newspaper to form HaYom, which ceased publication four years later.

== See also ==
- Israeli newspapers
- Politics of Israel
