= Jabotinsky Institute Archives =

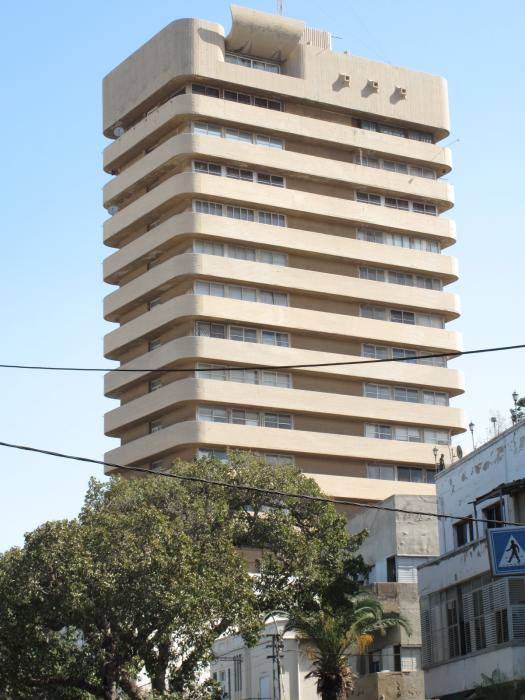
Metzudat Ze'ev, also known as the House of Jabotinski, where the Jabotinski Institute and Archives are located today

The Jabotinski Institute Archives located in the Jabontinski Institute in King George Street 38, in Tel-Aviv contains documents, pictures and different art artifacts related to the Revisionist Zionism movement, its different factions and branches and its history.

== Foundation and early history ==
Founded in the 1930s by Yosef Pa'amoni, a member of Etzel (Irgun) founder of the first aid unit in the Irgun and one of the founders of the Leumit Health Care Services, in his private apartment initially, and later relocated to the offices of the Leumit Health Care Services. In 1938, following criminal investigations led by British officers for suspected Irgun members and the execution by hanging of Shlomo Ben-Yosef, the collection and organization of archival materials at the health fund offices was halted. The archive's activities resumed in 1940 when the Irgun suspended its operations against the British at the outbreak of World War II.

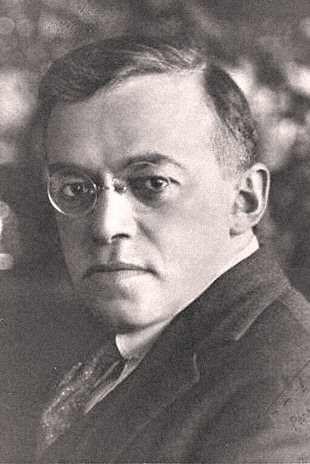
Ze'ev Jabotinski

After World War II, documents related to the activities of the Betar youth movement and the Revisionist movement in Europe arrived at the archive. Yosef Pa'amoni located numerous materials; among other efforts, while attending the 22nd Zionist Congress, he met with representatives of the Revisionist movement from around the world and asked them to hand over publications, photographs, and documents regarding their activities to the Betar Museum. Around that same time, Ze'ev Jabotinsky's personal archive was deposited there by his family. In 1947, shortly before the Betar movement was declared an illegal organization by the British Mandate government, its name was changed from the Betar Museum to the "Jabotinsky Institute."

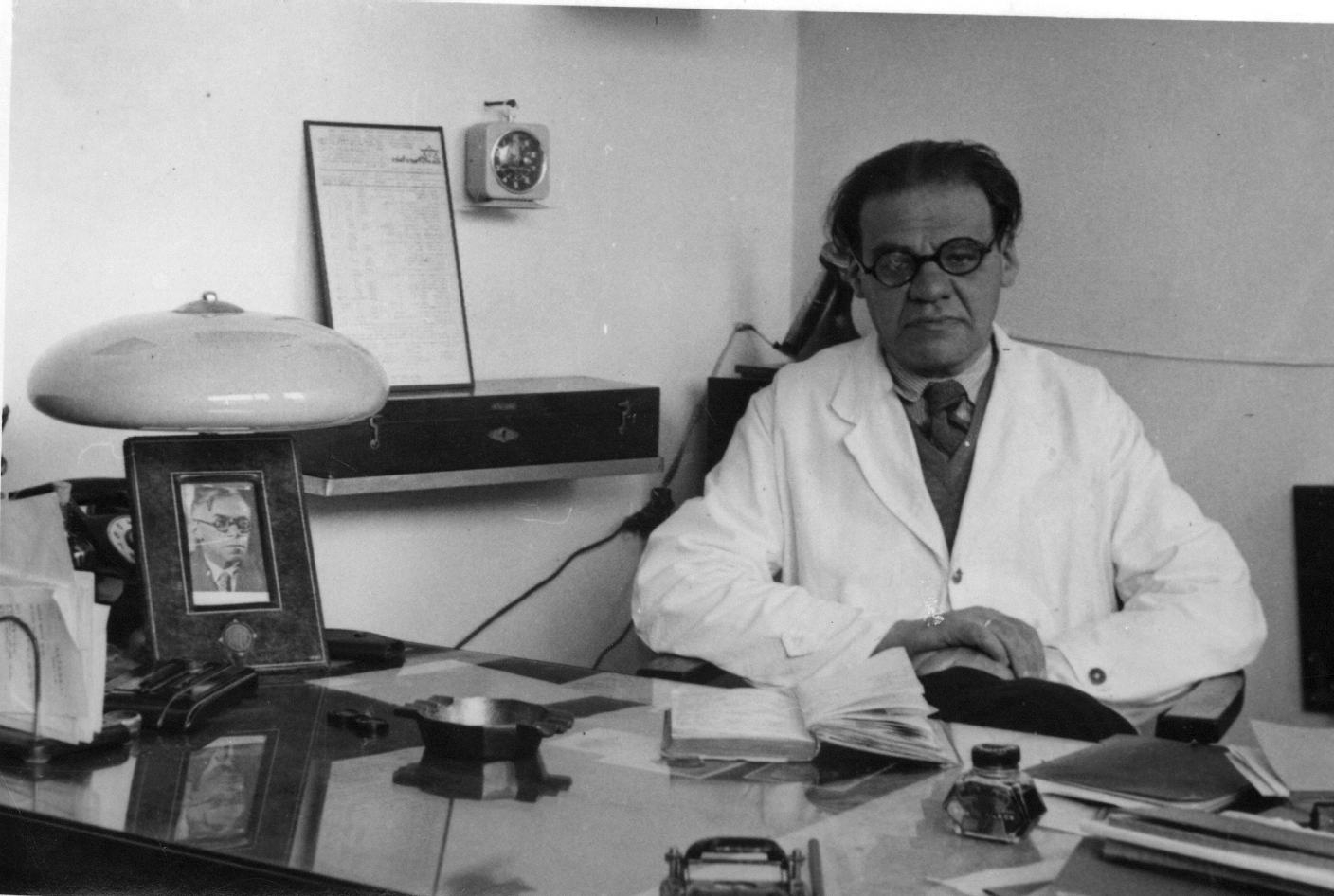
Pa'amoni behind his desk, at Leumit (around 1950), a picture of Ze'ev Jabotinski can be seen on the table

Following the establishment of the State of Israel, Pa'amoni prepared a plan for receiving archival materials and displaying them to visitors. The archive also began serving as the official archive of the Herut movement, and subsequently of the parties into which it merged, Gahal and Likud. In 1958, the archive was granted the status of a Public Archive under the Archives Law. In 1964, at the request of the institute's management, the historian Prof. Daniel Carpi submitted a proposal for organizing and arranging the archival materials according to professional archival standards. Pesach Gani, who was appointed director of the archive following the death of Pa'amoni, implemented the plan and continued developing the archive. The archive moved into the Metzudat Ze'ev building after its construction. In 1990, upon Pesach Gani's retirement, the role passed to Amira Stern, and the process of computerizing and digitizing the archive began.

== Artifacts in the archive ==
The archive houses 406 personal archives belonging to Ze'ev Jabotinsky, his family members, and leaders and activists of the Revisionist movement, alongside approximately 215 institutional archives. Organizations and institutions that have deposited records in the archive include: the Union of Revisionist Zionists or Hatzohar, the New Zionist Organization or Hatzach, the Betar youth movement and its branches in Israel and around the world, the National Labor Federation, the Tel Hai Fund, various committees and leagues (such as the Hebrew Maritime League and the Hebrew Committee of National Liberation), the Herut movement, Gahal, and Likud, as well as archives and collections of the underground organizations Nili, Brit HaBirionim, the Etzel, and Lehi. It also holds documents related to Aliyah Bet (clandestine immigration), Olei HaGardom (underground fighters executed by the British), underground detainees exiled to Africa, and others.

The archive's collections encompass millions of items across diverse media: manuscripts, original and reproduced works of art (paintings and sculptures), printed materials (produced by typewriter, mimeograph, and printing press) such as letters, newspapers, and books, as well as audio and video recordings. They span numerous formats, including photographs (approximately 35,000), flags, emblems, posters, stamps, and postcards.
