= Hillel Kook =

Revisionist Zionist activist and Israeli politician (1915–2001)

- הלל קוק
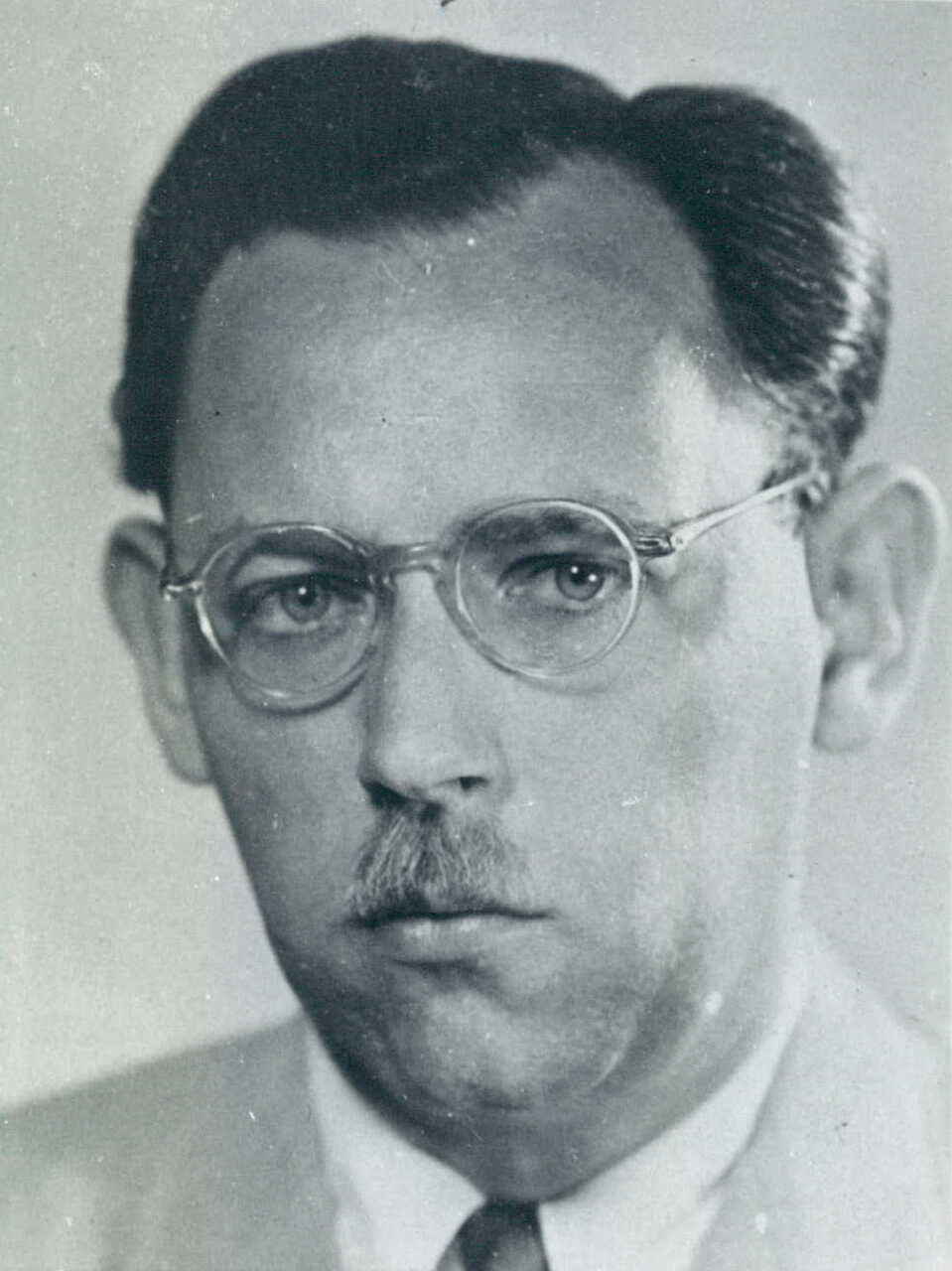

Faction represented in the Knesset
- 1949–1951: Herut
- 1951: Independent

Personal details
- Born: 24 July 1915 Kriukai, Russian Empire
- Died: 18 August 2001 (aged 86) Kfar Shmaryahu, Israel

Hillel Kook (Hebrew: הלל קוק; 24 July 1915 –18 August 2001), also known as Peter Bergson (Hebrew: פיטר ברגסון), was a Revisionist Zionist activist and politician.

Kook led the Irgun's efforts in the United States during World War II and the Holocaust in order to promote Zionism, attempting thereby to save the abandoned Jews of Europe. His rescue group's activism was a factor leading to President Franklin D. Roosevelt establishing the War Refugee Board, which rescued as many as 200,000 European Jews, partly via the Wallenberg mission. He later served in Israel's first Knesset, but resigned in 1951 after becoming disillusioned with Israeli politics.

== Early life ==
Hillel Kook was born in Kriukai in the Russian Empire (today in Lithuania) in 1915, the son of Rabbi Dov Kook, the younger brother of Abraham Isaac Kook, the first Ashkenazi chief rabbi of Mandatory Palestine. In 1924, his family immigrated to Palestine, where his father became the first Chief Rabbi of Afula. Hillel Kook received a religious education in Afula and attended his uncle's Religious Zionist yeshiva, Merkaz HaRav in Jerusalem. He also attended classes in Jewish Studies at the Hebrew University, where he became a member of Sohba ("Comradeship"), a group of students who would later become prominent in the Revisionist movement, including David Raziel and Avraham Stern.

== Military career ==
Kook joined the pre-state Haganah militia in 1930 following widespread Arab riots. In 1931, Kook helped found the Irgun (Etzel), a group of militant Haganah dissidents, and fought with them in Palestine through most of the 1930s. He served as a post commander in 1936, and eventually became a member of the Irgun General Staff.

In 1937, Kook began his career as an international spokesperson for the Irgun and Revisionist Zionism. He first went to Poland, where he was involved in fundraising and establishing Irgun cells in Eastern Europe. It was there that he met the founder of the Revisionist movement, Ze'ev Jabotinsky, and became friends with his son Eri (or "Ari"). At the founders' request, Kook traveled to the United States with Jabotinsky in 1940, where he soon served as the head of the Irgun and revisionist mission in America, following the elder's death in August. This assignment was clandestine, and Kook publicly denied he was affiliated with the Irgun many times while in America.

== Activism in the United States ==
=== Founding the Bergson Group ===
While in America, Kook led a group of Irgun activists under the pseudonym "Peter Bergson". The name "Bergson Group" or "Bergsonites" eventually became used to refer to all the members of Kook's immediate circle. The Bergson Group was composed of a hard-core cadre of ten Irgun activists from Europe, America and Palestine, including Aryeh Ben-Eliezer, Yitzhak Ben-Ami, Alexander Rafaeli, Shmuel Merlin, and Eri Jabotinsky. The Bergson Group was closely involved with various Jewish and Zionist advocacy groups, such as the American Friends for a Jewish Palestine and the Organizing Committee of Illegal Immigration. The group also founded some separate initiatives of its own, specifically the Committee for a Jewish Army of Stateless and Palestinian Jews, whose goal was the formation of an Allied fighting force of stateless and Palestinian Jews. Some credit the later formation of the Jewish Brigade, a British unit of Palestinian Jews, with Kook's activism. Two American members of the Bergson Group were author and screenwriter Ben Hecht and cartoonist Arthur Szyk.

Initially the Bergson Group largely limited its activities to Irgun fundraising and various propaganda campaigns. The outbreak of World War II saw a dramatic transformation in the group's focus. As information about the Holocaust began to reach the United States, Kook and his fellow activists became more involved in trying to raise awareness about the fate of the Jews in Europe. This included putting full-page advertisements in leading newspapers, such as "Jews Fight for the Right to Fight", published in The New York Times in 1942, and "For Sale to Humanity 70,000 Jews, Guaranteed Human Beings at $50 a Piece", in response to an offer by Romania to send their Jews to safety if the travel expenses would be provided. On March 9, 1943, the Group produced a huge pageant in Madison Square Garden written by Ben Hecht, titled "We Will Never Die", memorializing the 2,000,000 European Jews who had already been murdered. Forty thousand people saw the pageant that first night, and it went on to play in five other major cities including Washington, D.C., where First Lady Eleanor Roosevelt, six Supreme Court Justices, and some 300 senators and congressmen watched it.

=== Emergency Committee for the Rescue of European Jewry ===
In 1943, Kook established the Emergency Committee for the Rescue of European Jewry. The Committee, which included Jewish and non-Jewish American writers, public figures, and politicians, worked to disseminate information to the general public, and also lobbied the President of the United States and Congress to take immediate action to save the remnants of Europe's Jews. US immigration laws at the time limited immigration to only 2% of the number of each nationality present in the United States since the census of 1890, which limited Jews from Austria and Germany to 27,370 and from Poland to 6,542; even these quotas often went unfilled, due to United States State Department pressure on US consulates to place as many obstacles as possible in the path of refugees.

The proposal to admit more refugees was ratified by the United States Senate Committee on Foreign Relations, and, in response to the pressure by the Bergson Group as well as Jewish Secretary of Treasury Henry Morgenthau Jr and his team, President Roosevelt subsequently issued an administrative order in January 1944 for the establishment of a special national authority, the War Refugee Board (WRB) to deal with Jewish and non-Jewish war refugees. An official government emissary sent to Turkey was of considerable assistance in the rescue of Romanian Jewry. Historian David Wyman felt that WRB saved about 200,000 Jews, which is an over-estimate. Those rescued through the WRB were probably mostly in Hungary, in part through the Raoul Wallenberg mission which was sponsored by the WRB.

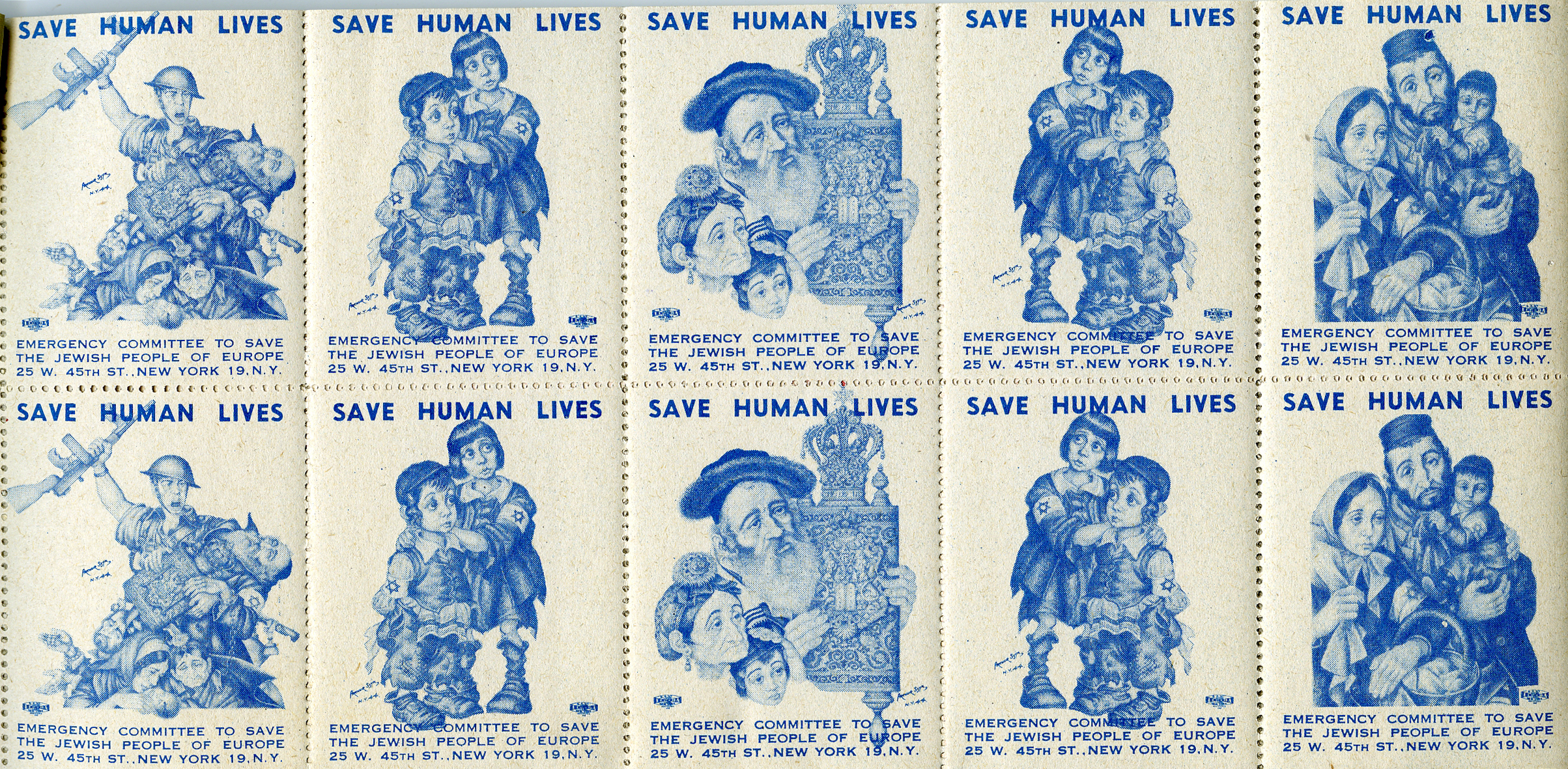
Poster Stamps "Save Human Lives" by Arthur Szyk 1944

Some of the members of the Emergency Committee to Save the Jewish People of Europe were: Hillel Kook (Peter Bergson) and Alex Hadani Rafaeli, Alex Wilf, Arieh Ben-Eliezer, Arthur Szyk, Ben Hecht, Ben Rabinowitz (Robbins), Eri Jabotinsky, Esther Untermeyer, Gabe Wechsler, Senator Guy Gillette, Harry Selden, Johan Smertenko, Konrad Bercovici, M. Berchin, Shmuel Merlin, Sigrid Undset, Stella Adler, Congressman Will Rogers, Jr., Yitzchak Ben-Ami, and John Henry Patterson. There were many others who actively supported the Bergson Group, including a number of the best known people in Broadway theatre and Hollywood, probably due to Hecht's contacts (such as Kurt Weill).

=== Opposition and political friction ===
In July of 1943, Kook and his followers began a campaign to lobby Congress for a resolution to create an independent agency to save European Jews. In this effort, they were opposed by American Zionist and progressive Jewish organizations. In December 1943, the American Jewish Conference launched a public attack against Bergson and his supporters in an attempt to derail support for the resolution. The British embassy and several American Zionist groups, including the World Jewish Congress, American Jewish Committee and other political opponents sought to have Kook deported or drafted for the war. They encouraged the Internal Revenue Service to investigate the Bergson Group's finances in an attempt to discredit them, hoping to find misappropriation, or at least careless bookkeeping, of the large amount of funds the groups handled. The United States IRS found no financial irregularities. Among those trying to stop the Bergson Group's rescue activities were Chairman of the Foreign Affairs Committee Congressman Sol Bloom, and World Jewish Congress leaders Stephen Samuel Wise and Nahum Goldmann. A State Department protocol shows Goldmann telling the State Department that Hillel Kook did not represent organized Jewry, and suggested either deporting him or drafting him for the war effort.

=== Rabbis' march ===
One of the Committee's more memorable activities was a protest in Washington, D.C. that Kook organized, which took place on October 6, 1943—three days before Yom Kippur. Known as the Rabbis' march, the event involved solely Orthodox rabbis, who were intent on pleading for the lives of the European Jews before the US government. Sol Bloom tried unsuccessfully to deter the rabbis from carrying out the march. Joined by Bergson Group activists, the Jewish War Veterans of the United States of America marched on the United States Capitol, Lincoln Memorial, and White House in Washington, DC, where the protesters plead for US intervention on behalf of the Jews in Europe. They were met by a number of prominent members of Congress including Senator William Warren Barbour (R; New Jersey). The delegation was received by Vice President Henry Wallace. Disappointed by the President's failure to meet with them, the rabbis stood in front of the US Capitol, where they were met by Barbour and other members of Congress. They refused to read their petition aloud, instead handing it to the Presidential secretary, Marvin H. McIntyre. The march garnered much media attention, much of it focused on what was seen as the cold and insulting dismissal of many important community leaders, as well as the people in Europe they were fighting for. One Jewish newspaper commented, "Would a similar delegation of 500 Catholic priests have been thus treated?" Years later, Joseph B. Soloveitchik, in recorded lectures, would bemoan the betrayal of the Rabbis' mission by Stephen Samuel Wise, who dismissed them as a group of Orthodox rabbis who didn't represent anyone. A week later, Barbour proposed legislation that would have allowed as many as 100,000 victims of the Holocaust to emigrate temporarily to the United States. A parallel bill was introduced in the House of Representatives by Rep. Samuel Dickstein (D; New York). This also failed to pass.

=== Irgun advocacy ===
The Irgun declared an open revolt against British rule in Palestine. To assist in recruiting and propaganda efforts, Kook established the Hebrew Committee for National Liberation and the American League for a Free Palestine, both of which were involved in lobbying U.S. and other diplomats and in trying to attract the American public to support the Irgun's rebellion. Kook remained strongly affiliated with the Revisionist camp after the war during the creation of the State of Israel. While he was unquestionably loyal to the cause, his position as the Irgun's leading American activist was not free from conflict. In 1946 Kook received a letter from Menachem Begin, who had become chief of the Irgun in 1943. Begin admonished Kook for various policy positions that strayed from the official Irgun party-line. These included Kook not focusing on illegal immigration to Palestine and arms shipments to Irgun fighters. Begin also objected to Kook's (and others' rather common) usage of the term "Palestine". At the time Kook established the Hebrew Embassy in Washington and was in the habit of saying "Palestine Free State", which Begin thought left too much potential for bi-nationalism. Begin demanded that Kook refer to the future Jewish state as the "Free State of Eretz Israel".

== Political career ==
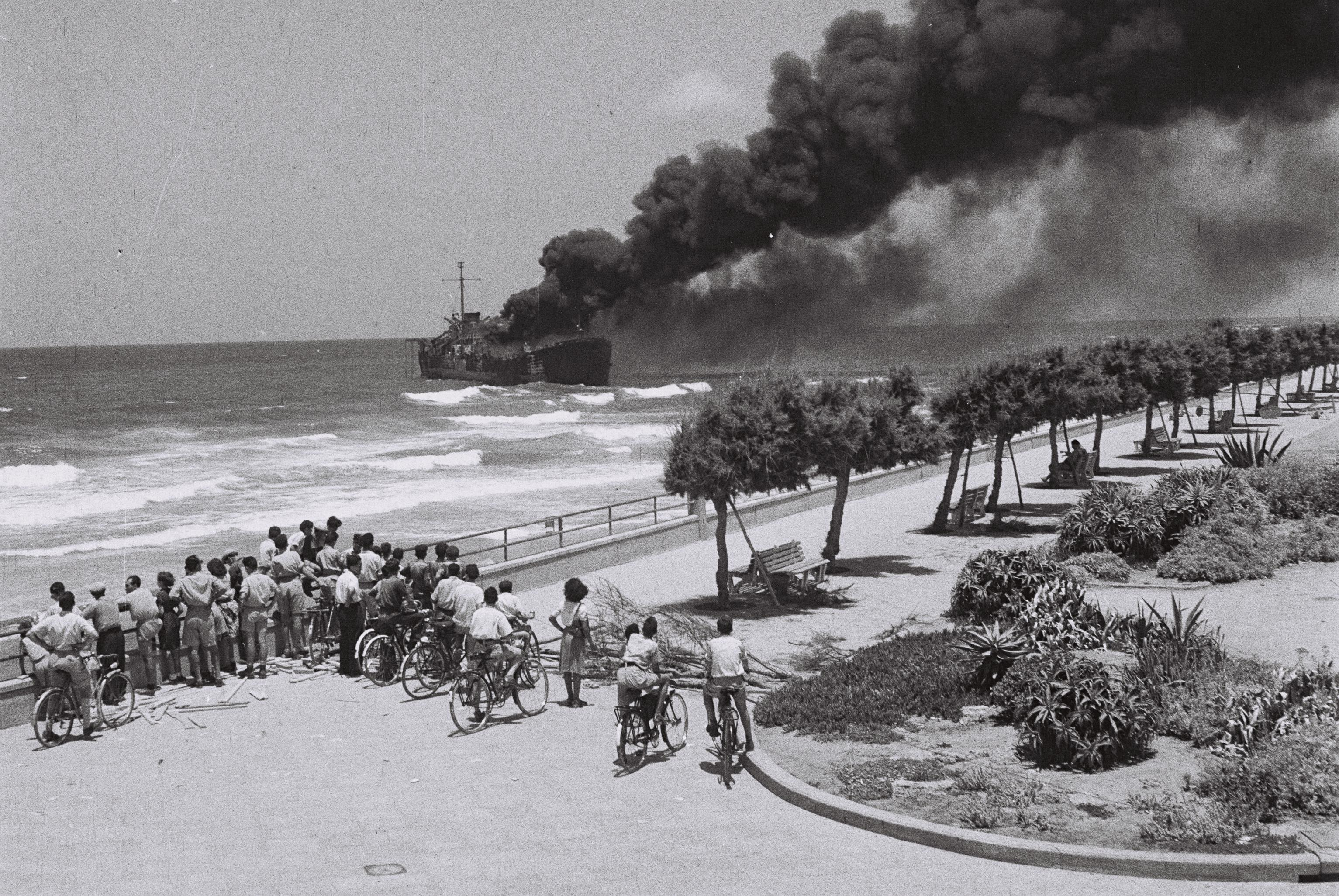
Altalena on fire after being shelled near Tel Aviv

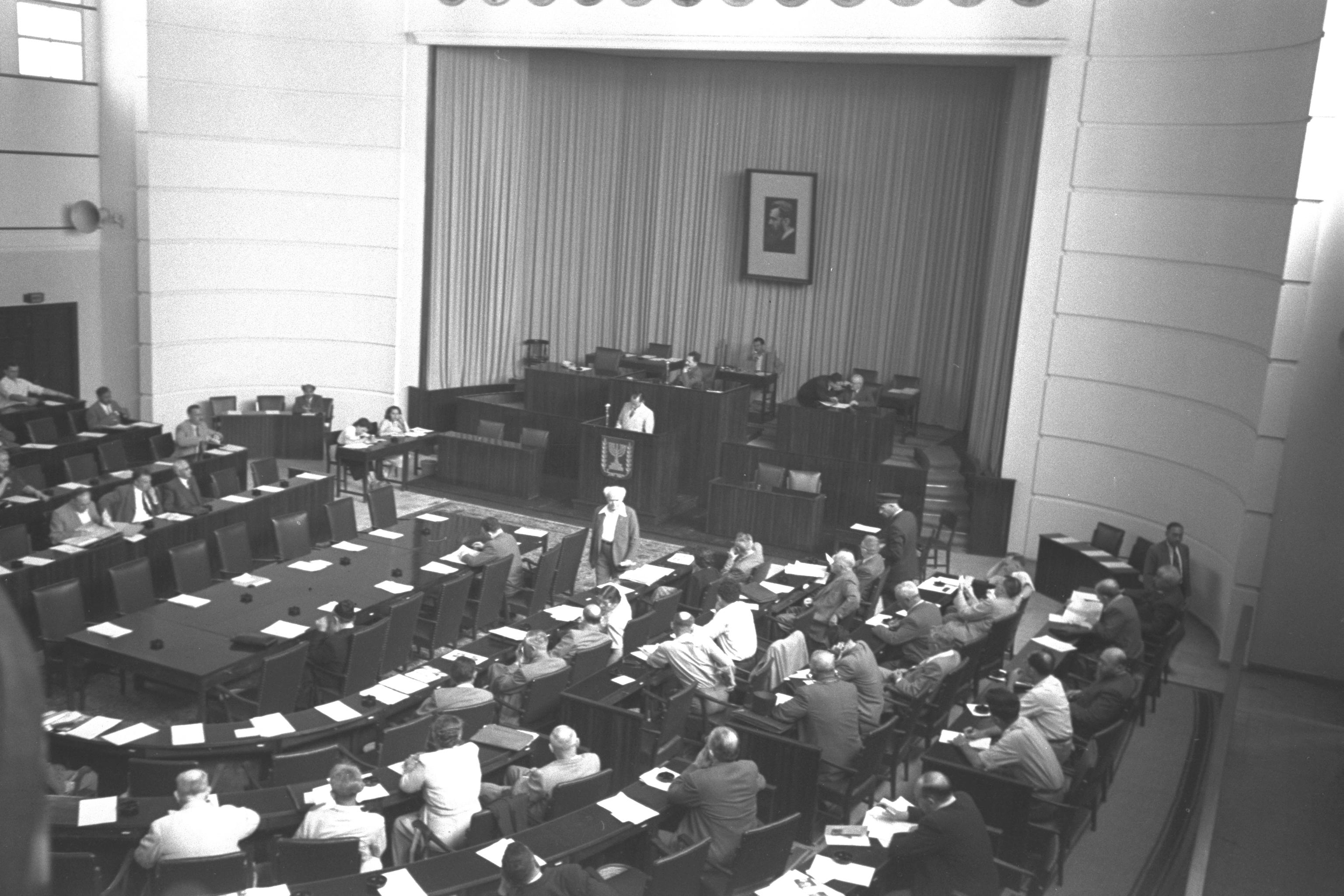
Hillel Kook at podium in the Knesset

In 1947, the Bergson Group had purchased a ship originally intended to carry new immigrants to Palestine, but, perhaps partially due to Begin's influence, was eventually used to ship arms. The ship, named Altalena, carried a large number of American Mahal volunteers for the War of Independence. Differences about how to allocate the arms shipment soon led to a violent armed confrontation between the newly formed Israel Defense Forces and the Irgun on the beaches of Kfar Vitkin and Tel Aviv. Many on the ship who jumped into the sea were killed. That night, Begin spoke on the radio and commanded his followers not to take revenge and prevented a probable civil war among Israel's Jewish residents. Following the Altalena Affair, Kook was arrested with four other senior Irgun commanders and held for over two months. Of the five, only Kook was a member of the Bergson Group. The five were eventually released after about two months.

Kook served in the first Knesset as part of the Herut party list, but quit the party with his close friend and fellow Herut Member of the Knesset Eri Jabotinsky. This followed two years of ongoing disagreements with their colleagues, particularly Begin, over the party's leadership and direction. Kook, who had returned to Israel after a ten-year absence, was now confronted with the reality that the country and movement he had fought for bore little resemblance to his ideals. Kook and Jabotinsky served as independent or "single" MKs for the remaining months of their terms, the first ever to do so. Profoundly disillusioned with the Israeli political process and future of the Revisionist movement, Kook moved to the United States in 1951 with his wife and daughter and built a career as a Wall Street stockbroker. In 1968, four years after his wife's death, he returned to Israel with his two daughters. He remarried in 1975 and lived near Tel Aviv in Kfar Shmaryahu until his death in 2001.

== Views and opinions ==
While Kook never re-entered politics, he continued to give interviews in which he articulated his independent perspectives on Zionism, Jewish identity, and Israeli politics. He held that Jabotinsky's primary goal in creating a Jewish state was in making a country to which all Jews would want to belong, and that once Israel had been created, any Jews who refused to make aliyah had made a conscious choice to become "integrated" citizens of their naturalized countries. He specifically excluded American Jews from the "Right of Return" to the Land of Israel and wanted to limit that right in general to a very short period. He envisioned Israel having a "Hebrew Nation": an amalgam of all residents. Making a distinction between Jews and Hebrews was another point of contention between Kook and the Irgun leadership as early as the mid–1940s. Kook's views have been described as a more moderate version of the "Canaanist" ideology espoused by Yonatan Ratosh. Like Ratosh, Kook was influenced by Adolf Gurevich, a Betar activist with connections to Bergson Group members Shmuel Merlin and Eri Jabotinsky.

Kook had a specific body of critiques concerning what he saw as the distortion of Zionist philosophy and idealism by Israeli politics. He maintained that he had always conceived of Israel being a "Jewish state" by having a majority of Jewish citizens, not through specific associations to Jewish nationalism. Paradoxically, Kook's "theocratic" vision of Israel gave him a great deal of ideological flexibility regarding some of Israel's more intractable problems. Accordingly, he supported all non-Jewish citizens of Israel with full rights and privileges, and once, in an interview with an Israeli Druze, commented that, like Jabotinsky, he saw "no reason" why the State of Israel could not have a non-Jewish president. He suggested amending the Law of Return for Jews residing outside Israel to be limited to a few years after Independence (1948) and to consider prospective immigrants on an individual, and not on a national or religious basis, except for cases of immediate danger.

Kook was also a strong supporter of Israel's constitution, which had been stalled during its writing in 1948 and never completed. Kook claimed that a formal constitution could have solved many ongoing issues in Israeli society, such as discrimination against Israeli Arabs, by providing all of Israel's citizens with a clearly defined, and egalitarian, role in Israeli nationalism. He once remarked that the lack of a constitution was "Israel's greatest tragedy": that Ben-Gurion's decision to change the Israeli governing body from a Constituent Assembly to a Parliament had been a putsch, and that he regretted not having resigned from the Knesset immediately after the decision had been made. Kook also favored the creation of a Palestinian state, albeit one established in modern-day Jordan. He was one of the first Israelis to call for a Palestinian state shortly after the Six-Day War. For the remainder of his life, Kook adamantly claimed that his position would have been shared by his mentor Jabotinsky.

Kook repeatedly referred to himself as a post-Zionist, and was one of the first in Israeli society to voluntarily (and positively) adopt the term.

== Commemoration and legacy ==
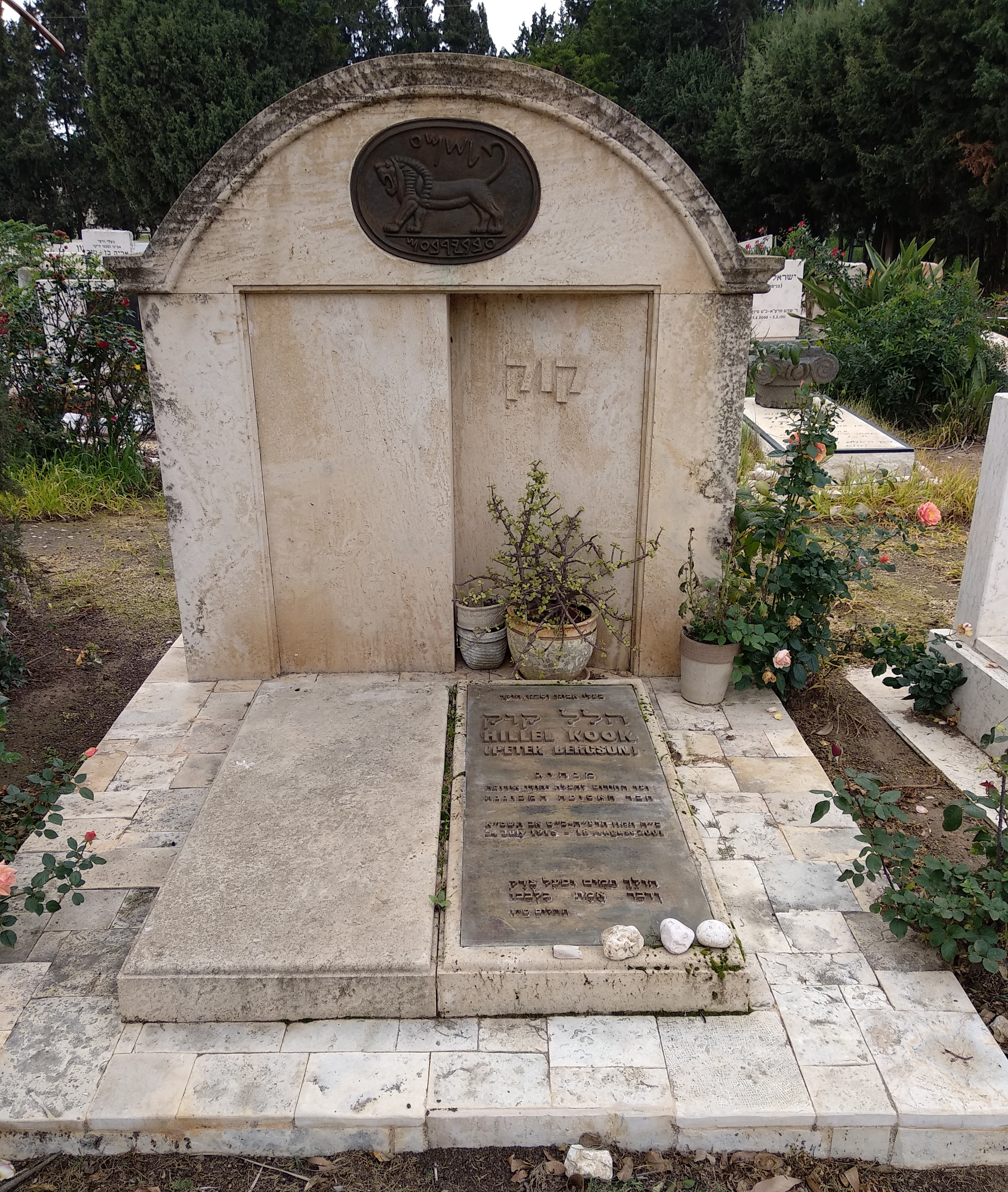
Grave of Hillel Kook, Kfar Shmaryahu

Despite the important rescue activism of Kook and the Bergson Group during the Holocaust, there is scant public recognition of his activities in the state of Israel. Yehuda Bauer, chief historian of Yad Vashem, said at one point that "Hillel Kook didn't save anyone!" Although Kook was a founder of the Irgun underground group, appointed Menachem Begin as its commander, was a founding member of the Knesset, and fought valiantly in 1948 for the establishment of a Constitution, no public place in Jerusalem is named for Kook. Since the late 1990s, some historians have attempted to re-examine and evaluate the significance of his activities during World War II and his role as a political opponent of Begin. One allegation is that Kook's adversaries in Israel and America downplayed some of his accomplishments and minimized their own role in curtailing his activities. David Wyman and Rafael Medoff, co-authors of a 2002 Kook biography, suggested that, despite the frequent obstruction by the modern mainstream American Jewish and Zionist establishment, Kook's rescue group's activism was the major factor in establishment of the War Refugee Board and that it was an instrument rescuing approximately 200,000 (probably an over-estimate), partly by means of the Raoul Wallenberg mission.

Despite his many important accomplishments there is no place in Jerusalem named after Hillel Kook and he and his committee are not mentioned the Yad Vashem museum. The street at a very prestigious location next to the Israel Museum, Israel National Library, Knesset is named for Wise. There is a large sign by the Jerusalem Municipality and the World Jewish Congress in honor of Goldman at the building where he resided. The above main obstructors of the rescue committee Kook formed and led received much recognition and very high positions after the war in the mainstream Jewish and Zionist world.

The Accomplices is a play written by Bernard Weinraub and based on Kook's wartime efforts in the United States. It premiered at The New Group in 2007 and played thereafter in regional theatres. It also played in Jerusalem in April 2009 and at the Jerusalem Khan theater in early 2025.

The role of Hillel Kook was played twice onstage by actor Steven Schub (lead singer of The Fenwicks), in 2008 at The Fountain Theatre and in 2009 at the Odyssey Theatre in Los Angeles. Actor Raphael (Rafi) Poch (Artistic Director of J-Town Playhouse) played Hillel Kook in Jerusalem.

Film maker Pierre Sauvage directed a documentary about the activities of Kook during World War II: Not Idly By - Peter Bergson, America and the Holocaust. The film won an award at the Toronto Jewish Film Festival. The work-in-progress was screened in short versions beginning in 2009, and the final version was released in 2017.

There was an earlier 1982 documentary Who Shall Live and Who Shall Die by Larry Jarvik, including many of his mid-1970s interviews with Hillel Kook in Manhattan. The more recent 2009 Against the Tide, directed by Richard Trank and produced by Moriah Films of the Simon Wiesenthal Center, includes narration by Dustin Hoffman.

== Quotes ==
We, the Hebrews, descendants of the ancient Hebrew nation, who remained alive on God's earth despite that great calamity that our people have experienced, have come together in the Hebrew Committee of National Liberation. The Jews today who live in the European hell together with the Jews in the Land of Israel constitute the Hebrew nation—there isn't another nation to which they owe their allegiance but the Hebrew nation. We must state it clearly: the Jews in the United States do not belong to the Hebrew nation. These Jews are Americans of Hebrew descent.

— A Manifesto of the Hebrew Nation, 1944.

Why did we respond the way we did? The question should be, why didn't the others? We responded as a human and as a Jew should.

— On his Holocaust activism, 1973

I, who was the liaison officer of the Irgun central command with Jabotinsky, and who accompanied him almost daily for four years—remained loyal to his teachings. I also believe that the Land of Israel, on both banks of the Jordan River, is our historic homeland. But I am also certain that had Jabotinsky lived today, he would have argued that now, after we've achieved our independence, our mission is to attain peace in order to establish the Israeli people as the political heir of the Jewish people.

— Interview in 1977

There is no exile. The exile ended on May 14, 1948.

— Interview in 1982

== Recorded talks, statements and song ==
- Prof. David Kranzler: interview with Hillel Kook (New York)
- Talk by daughter Dr. Becky Kook at Hillel Kook Memorial Lecture at Orthodox Union (OU) Israel Center, Jerusalem Aug 27 2003
- Dr. Becky Kook talks about her father at International Rescuer Day 2006, Hebrew University
- Dr. Becky Kook. Hillel Kook the Unsung Hero via Zoom, organized by B'nei Brit, Dusseldorf
- Dr. Becky Kook talks about her father MK Hillel Kook (aka Peter Bergson) via Zoom organized by Moadon Ivri club in Paris (in Hebrew)
- Rabbi Dr. Norman Lamm. Beacons in the Dark
- Professor MP Irv Cotler. Beacons in the Dark
- The Rescuers song by David Ben Reuven

== See also ==
- George Mantello, Holocaust rescuer, publicized the Auschwitz Report
- Gisi Fleischmann, Zionist activist and Holocaust rescuer
- Michael Dov Weissmandl, Holocaust rescuer
- Recha and Yitzchak Sternbuch, Holocaust rescuers
- Solomon Schonfeld, Holocaust rescuer

== Videos ==
- ALTALENA (VHS video produced in Israel)
- Laurence Jarvik, Who Shall Live and Who Shall Die (dist. on DVD by KINO International at: kino.com
- [https://www.youtube.com/watch?v=2TpMvAmjyks Interview with Hillel Kook by Prof. David Kranzler in New York
- Not Idly By: Peter Bergson, America and the Holocaust (2009 documentary short) by Pierre Sauvage, Varian Fry Institute
- Richard M Trank, Against the Tide, about Hillel Kook and the rescue group he led, as well as about obstruction by the American Jewish establishment leadership (Moriah Films, USA 2008)
