= Haim Cohen-Meguri =

Israeli politician

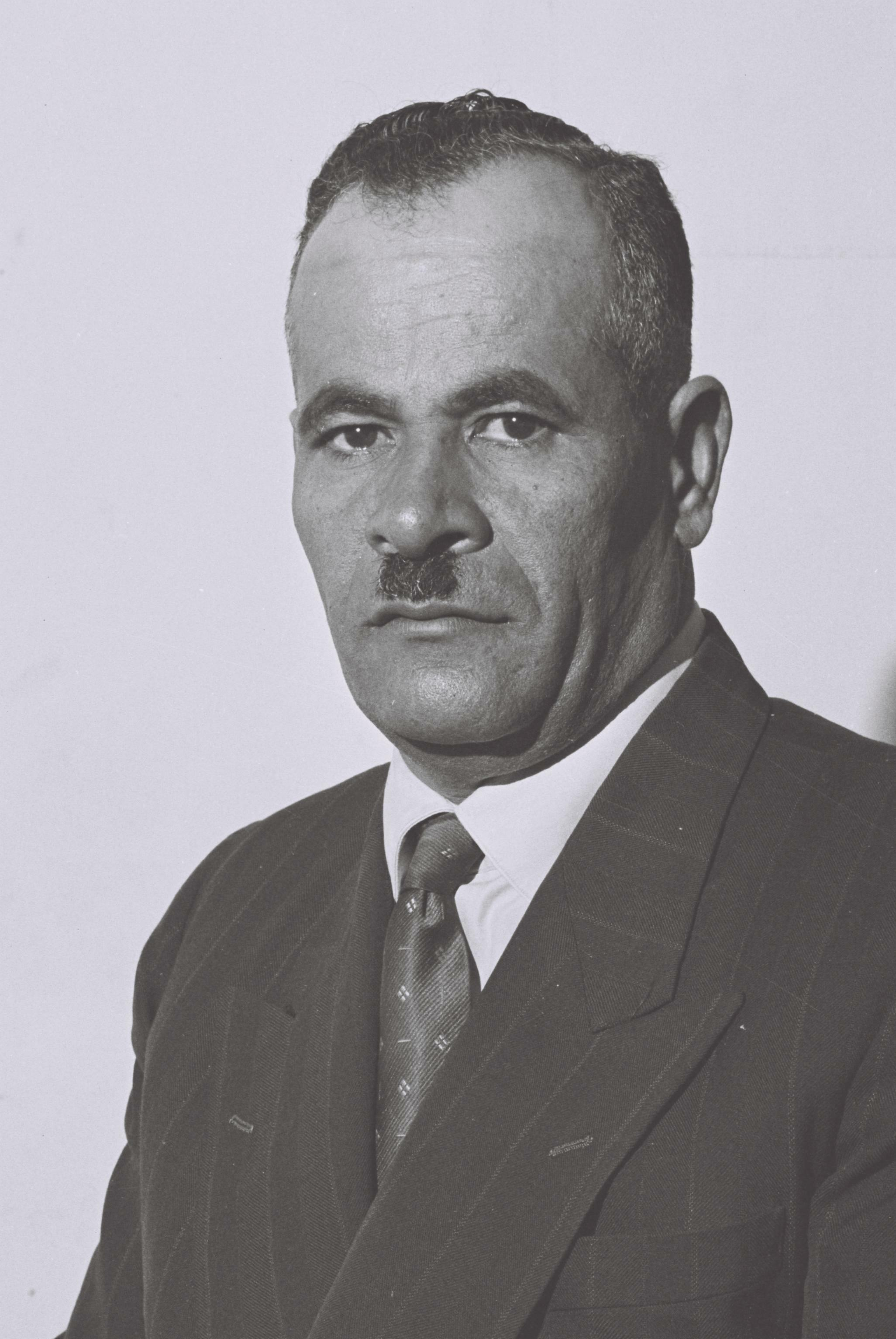
- Cohen-Meguri in 1959

Faction represented in the Knesset
- 1949–1951: Herut
- 1953–1965: Herut
- 1965–1969: Gahal

Personal details
- Born: 1 April 1913 Yemen, Ottoman Empire
- Died: 10 June 2000 (aged 87)

Haim Cohen-Meguri (Hebrew: חיים כהן-מגורי; 1 April 1913 – 10 June 2000) was an Israeli politician who served as a member of the Knesset for Herut and Gahal.

== Biography ==
Born in Yemen Vilayet in the Ottoman Empire, Cohen-Meguri emigrated to Mandatory Palestine in 1921. In 1927 he joined the Revisionist Zionist Betar movement, and in 1935 joined the Irgun.

In 1948 he joined Menachem Begin's Herut movement, and became a member of its central committee and directorate. He was elected to the Knesset on Herut's list in 1949. Although he lost his seat in the 1951 elections, he returned to the Knesset on 6 July 1953 as a replacement for Aryeh Ben-Eliezer. He was re-elected in 1955, 1959, 1961 and 1965, by which time Herut had allied with the Liberal Party under the name Gahal. He lost his seat in the 1969 elections.

In addition to being a member of the Knesset, Cohen-Meguri also served on Netanya's city council and religious council. He died in 2000 at the age of 87.
