= A Flag Is Born =

Play written by Ben Hecht

Program cover. Comparisons to the American Revolution. (Yehudah Magnes opposed it).

A Flag Is Born is a 1946 play that advocated the creation of a homeland for the Jewish people in the ancient Land of Israel—at the time of the play's release Mandatory Palestine, under British administration. With a cast including Paul Muni, Celia Adler and Marlon Brando, it opened on Broadway on September 4, 1946. It was written by Ben Hecht and directed by Luther Adler, with music by Kurt Weill. A Flag Is Born was produced by the American League for a Free Palestine, an organization headed by Hillel Kook (known in America by the anglicized name Peter Bergson), to raise money for Zionist causes.

== Synopsis ==
A Flag Is Born has three principal characters, with other actors playing bit roles. Tevye and Zelda (played on Broadway by Paul Muni and Celia Adler, major stars at the time) are survivors of the Treblinka death camp who are attempting to travel to British-administered Palestine, the ancient Land of Israel. David (Marlon Brando) is an angry young Holocaust survivor.

The play opens with Tevye and Zelda ushering in the Jewish Sabbath on a Friday night somewhere on their journey. Zelda lights candles on a broken tombstone. After reciting the Sabbath prayers, Tevye dreams of the town where he was born, as it was before the Nazis destroyed it. A dream sequence follows in which Tevye has visions of the biblical kings Saul and David, then imagines himself standing before the United Nations Security Council pleading for the formation of a Jewish homeland in Palestine; he is ignored.

Tevye awakens to find that Zelda has died in the night. He recites kaddish, a Jewish memorial prayer, then welcomes the Angel of Death, who has come for him too. He bids David farewell. As David considers committing suicide, three Jewish soldiers (representing the Haganah, Irgun, and Lehi) suddenly appear and implore him to join them: "Don't you hear our guns David? We battle the English, the sly and powerful English. We speak to them in a new Jewish language, the language of guns. We fling no more prayers or tears at the world. We fling bullets. We fling barrages ... We promise to wrest our homeland out of the British claws."

In the play's finale, David delivers a fiery pro-Zionist speech, moves across a bridge into Palestine, and with the mixed sounds of "Hatikvah" and gunfire in the background, raises Tevye's prayer shawl as a makeshift flag and marches off to war.

== Zionist causes ==
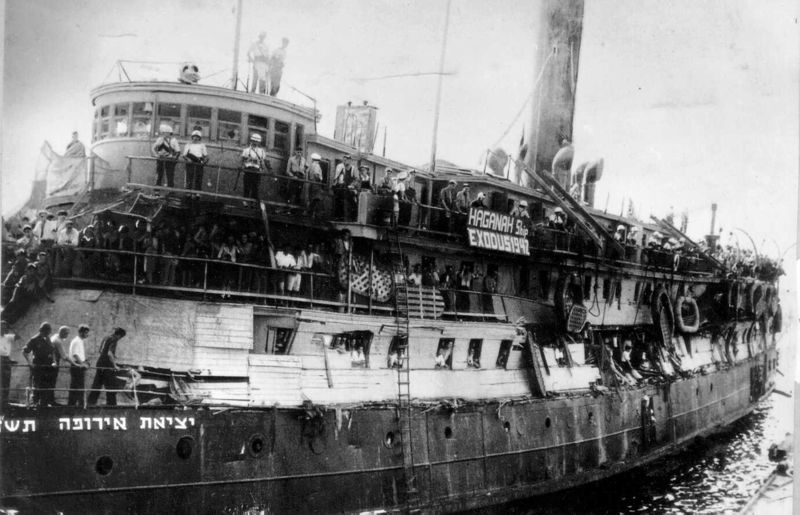
Jews, largely Holocaust survivors, sailing for Palestine aboard the SS Exodus in 1947. A Flag Is Born was produced to support such migrants.

A Flag Is Born was produced by the pro-Zionist American League for a Free Palestine (ALFP) to raise financial and political support for Zionist causes, including the transport of Jews from Europe. The AFLP was entirely open about its political motivations—publicity materials read: "A Flag Is Born is not ordinary theatre. It was not written to amuse or beguile. A Flag Is Born was written to make money—to make money to provide ships to get Hebrews to Palestine ... and [to] arouse American public opinion to support the fight for freedom and independence now being waged by the resistance in Palestine."

In promoting the play, the Bergson Group attempted to equate the Zionist organizations in Palestine with the Patriots of the American Revolution. The cover of the program showed three Zionists—one with a rifle, one with a hoe, and one with a Zionist flag—superimposed over three American Revolutionary figures. Advertisements used the slogan "It's 1776 in Palestine!", portrayed members of the Irgun as "modern-day Nathan Hales," alluded to "taxation without representation" in Palestine, and quoted Thomas Jefferson's phrase, "Resistance to tyranny is obedience to God." When Tevye dreams about addressing the United Nations, he compares Palestine in the 1940s with the American colonies in the 1770s. A Flag Is Born played in six North American cities and raised more than $400,000 for the ALFP, the largest block of funds it ever attained.

Brando had already been voted "Broadway's Most Promising Actor" for his role as an anguished veteran in Truckline Cafe, but that play was not a commercial success and Brando was still young, relatively unknown and impecunious. Brando contended that the survivors of the Holocaust deserved to have their own land where they could live freely; he accepted only the Actor's Equity minimum payment so more of the proceeds from A Flag Is Born could go towards Zionist causes.

== Reception and impact ==
Commenting on the play, opened on September 5, 1946, Bernard Lerner wrote in the Atlantic City Jewish Record in the context of post WW2: "It was an oversimplification of the Jewish resistance in Palestine, but what is important is that the audience, constituting the jury, indicated by its applause its vindication of all and any means Jews may use to obtain their ends – freedom in Palestine, freedom from DP camps."

After the play proved extremely popular, the Broadway run was extended and a tour was arranged. The sponsoring committee included many prominent people, including composer Leonard Bernstein, novelist Lion Feuchtwanger, New York City Mayor William O'Dwyer, and Eleanor Roosevelt.

Following the Broadway run, A Flag Is Born traveled to Chicago, Detroit, Philadelphia, and Boston. It was also scheduled to play at the National Theater in Washington, D.C. However, in an early action of the civil rights movement, Americans who opposed racial discrimination began a boycott to oppose the practice of barring blacks from attending Washington theaters, and the committee moved the play to the Maryland Theater in Baltimore. A special train brought members of Congress to the performance. The American League for a Free Palestine and the NAACP cooperated to use the occasion to force the management of the Maryland Theater to abrogate its segregation policy (blacks restricted to the balcony) for the duration of the play's run which, in the context of the times, was considered a victory for civil rights.
