= Bergson Group =

US Jewish activist group (1940–1948)

The Bergson Group was an organization of Jewish activists who advocated for the Roosevelt administration to save Jews from the Nazi genocide in Europe. Ideologically Revisionist Zionist, the group was active in the United States between 1940 and 1948.

== History ==
Founded by Hillel Kook, who had the pseudonym "Peter H. Bergson", the Bergson Group was a group formed during the Holocaust to advocate for the fight against Nazis and for rescuing Jews.

The Bergson Group was initially composed of ten Irgun activists from Europe, America and Palestine, including Aryeh Ben-Eliezer, Yitzhak Ben-Ami, Alexander Rafaeli, Shmuel Merlin, and Eri Jabotinsky, and was closely involved with Jewish and Zionist advocacy groups, such as the American Friends for a Jewish Palestine and the Organizing Committee of Illegal Immigration. The group founded the Committee for a Jewish Army of Stateless and Palestinian Jews, whose goal was the formation of an Allied fighting force of stateless and Palestinian Jews. Two American members of the Bergson Group were author and screenwriter Ben Hecht and cartoonist Arthur Szyk.

As information about the Holocaust began to reach the United States, Kook's Bergson Group shifted efforts from trying to create a Jewish army to rescuing Jews in Europe. This included putting full-page advertisements in leading newspapers, such as "Jews Fight for the Right to Fight", published in The New York Times in 1942, and "For Sale to Humanity 70,000 Jews, Guaranteed Human Beings at $50 a Piece", in response to an offer by Romania to send their Jews to safety if the travel expenses would be provided. On March 9, 1943, the Group produced a huge pageant in Madison Square Garden written by Ben Hecht, titled "We Will Never Die", in memory of the 2,000,000 European Jews who the Nazis had already murdered in the ongoing Holocaust. The performance was seen by forty thousand people its first night, and it travelled to five other cities including Washington, D.C., where First Lady Eleanor Roosevelt, six Supreme Court Justices, and some 300 senators and congressmen watched it.

After the creation of the Monuments Men to save European art in June 1943, at a time when the Roosevelt Administration was rejecting calls to save Jews who were being exterminated on an industrial scale by the Nazis, the Bergson Group took out full-page ads the New York Times questioning the Roosevelt administration's priorities.

== See also ==
- Rescue of Jews during the Holocaust
- United States and the Holocaust
- International response to the Holocaust
