= The Accomplices =

2007 play by Bernard Weinraub

The Accomplices is a 2007 play by New York Times reporter Bernard Weinraub. It premiered at The New Group in New York City in 2007 and played thereafter in regional theatres.

The play is based on Hillel Kook's (aka Peter Bergson) experiences in the United States during the Holocaust as founder and head of the Emergeency Committee for the Rescue of European Jewry, also referred to as the Bergson Group. The group was dedicated to pressure America to help rescue the abandoned Jews in Europe from the Nazi and other murderers. Kook and the committee's activism were strongly opposed by Reform Rabbi Stephen Samuel Wise, Chairman of the World Jewish Congress, and other mainstream Jewish, Zionist leaders in America.

The role of Hillel Kook was played twice onstage by actor Steven Schub (lead singer of The Fenwicks), in 2008 at The Fountain Theatre and in 2009 at the Odyssey Theatre in Los Angeles. Raphael Poch played Bergson at a 2009 production in Jerusalem and Conservative Rabbi David Golinkin played Wise. In early 2025, it is performed again at the Khan Theatre in Jerusalem, with Lior Burlin playing Bergson and Rabbi Golinkin as Wise.
