= We Will Never Die =

1943 dramatic pageant on the Holocaust

We Will Never Die was a dramatic pageant staged at Madison Square Garden on March 9, 1943, to raise public awareness of the ongoing mass murder of Europe's Jews. It was organized by the Bergson Group and written by screenwriter and author Ben Hecht, and produced by Billy Rose and Ernst Lubitsch. The musical score was composed by Kurt Weill (1900–1950), and staged by Moss Hart (1904–1961), a leading Broadway producer. The pageant starred Edward G. Robinson, Edward Arnold, John Garfield, Sam Levene, Paul Stewart, Sylvia Sidney, and Paul Muni. It subsequently traveled to other cities nationwide.

== Purpose of pageant ==
"Out of frustration over American policy and outrage at Hollywood's fear of offending its European markets", screenwriter and author Ben Hecht, in January 1942, held a dinner with numerous Jewish writers and others in the arts, to focus attention on the plight of Europe's Jewish population, then being decimated by Nazi Germany. Composer Kurt Weill and producer Moss Hart immediately volunteered to help in any way they could, with Weill stating, "Please count on me for everything."

== Performances ==
They first tried to produce a show titled Fight for Freedom, but gave up due to lack of funds. Finally, a pageant produced by Billy Rose, and directed by Moss Hart, titled, We Will Never Die, had two performances on March 9, 1943, in front of 40,000 spectators at Madison Square Garden. As part of the performances, "hundreds of voices were raised in prayer and song", to remind people about what was then happening to Europe's Jewish population, writes author Steven Bach. Two hundred rabbis and two hundred cantors invoked various prayers on stage. There were narrations and performances by Jewish stars, including Edward G. Robinson, Sam Levene, Paul Muni, Joan Leslie, Katina Paxinou, Sylvia Sidney, Edward Arnold, John Garfield, Paul Henreid, Jacob Ben-Ami, Blanche Yurka, J. Edward Bromberg, Akim Tamiroff, Roman Bohnen, Art Smith, Helene Thimig, Shimen Ruskin, and Leo Bulgakov, and by non-Jewish stars such as Ralph Bellamy, Frank Sinatra, and Burgess Meredith.

The show traveled on to Chicago, Philadelphia, Boston, Washington, D. C., and the Hollywood Bowl in Los Angeles on July 21, 1943. Governor Thomas E. Dewey of New York declared a day of mourning for Jews murdered by the Nazis. However, despite the show's national success, its main organizer, Ben Hecht, "took little comfort" from the pageant. Weill told Hecht, "The pageant has accomplished nothing. Actually, all we have done is make a lot of Jews cry, which is not a unique accomplishment." Years later, in 1946, after the war ended, Hecht wrote the play A Flag Is Born, to help promote the establishment of Israel for Europe's remaining Jews.

== Synopsis ==
Hollywood Bowl, July 21, 1943

Cast (in order of their appearance)

- The Roll Call
  - The Rabbi – Jacob Ben-Ami
  - The Narrators – Edward G. Robinson, Edward Arnold
- The Jew in War
  - The Narrators – John Garfield, Sam Levene
- The Battle of Warsaw
  - The Narrators – Paul Henreid, Katina Paxinou
  - The Voice – Paul Stewart
- Battle Hymn of the Ghetto
  - Music by Franz Waxman, lyrics by Frank Loesser
- Remember Us
  - The Narrators – Edward G. Robinson, Edward Arnold
  - Actors – Edward J. Bromberg, Roman Bohnen, Shimen Ruskin, Art Smith, Akim Tamiroff, Leo Bulgakov, Helene Thimig, Blanche Yurka, Joan Leslie, Alexander Granach

== Organizers ==
Weill and Hart had recently scored a big Broadway success with the musical Lady in the Dark, with lyrics by Ira Gershwin. At the time, Weill and Hart were supporting the war effort by collaborating on Lunchtime Follies (originally Lunch Hour Follies), a series of variety shows staged by the American Theatre Wing to boost the morale of workers in factories manufacturing war materials.

It is unlikely that Weill and Hecht had met during Hecht's reporting stint for the Chicago Daily News in Berlin in the early 1920s, but Weill had identified Hecht as early as 1934 as a potential American collaborator. It is probable that they met soon after Weill came to the U.S. in 1935 to work on The Eternal Road, a huge biblical spectacle staged in New York City by Max Reinhardt, with music by Weill and a libretto by Franz Werfel. Weill was also eventually connected socially to Hecht through his neighbors in Nyack, New York, including Burgess Meredith, Helen Hayes, and her husband, Charles MacArthur, who was Hecht's frequent collaborator.

=== Kurt Weill ===
Weill had all the necessary credentials to collaborate on We Will Never Die. As a German emigrant, son of a cantor, student of Ferruccio Busoni, and a born theater composer, he had mastered techniques for the effective use of music in both pageants and radio. He had used theater to highlight social concerns throughout his career. Although often characterized as a political composer because of his association in Germany with Bertolt Brecht, close analysis of his music and writings reveal him to be more concerned with the human condition than with political causes. His willingness to work on We Will Never Die was probably motivated more by the plight of the Jews in Europe than by a conviction to join Hecht in supporting Peter Bergson and the Committee for an Army of Stateless and Palestinian Jews.

Although largely a pacifist in his early years, Weill was deeply committed to supporting the American war effort, and demonstrating his allegiance to the U.S. In 1941, he had provided music for Fun to be Free. This earlier pageant by Hecht and Charles MacArthur was staged at Madison Square Garden, and sponsored by Fight for Freedom, Inc., a group that supported total U.S. involvement in the European war. He also wrote propaganda songs (some for broadcast in Germany); incidental music for Your Navy, a 1942 play, written by Maxwell Anderson and jointly commissioned by CBS Radio and NBC Radio; music for Salute to France, a 1945 U.S. propaganda film directed by Jean Renoir; and four patriotic melodramas for Helen Hayes, recorded by RCA Victor under the title Mine Eyes Have Seen the Glory.

When approached by Hecht to collaborate on We Will Never Die, Weill was busy developing a script with Bella Spewack for a Broadway show based on One Man's Venus to star Marlene Dietrich, a project that did not materialize, but that would later develop with other collaborators into One Touch of Venus. After reading Hecht's script, Weill decided to re-use some music from The Eternal Road, as well as other pre-existing music that would have meaning to the audience. As a result, the score is not a formal composition, but a collection of incidental music compiled to highlight the dramatic shape of Hecht's script.

Weill brought composer and conductor Isaac van Grove to the project to lead a 50-piece NBC orchestra, prepare the choruses, and deal with musical logistics. Having conducted 153 performances of The Eternal Road, Grove was the perfect musician to adapt excerpts from the work to the requirements of We Will Never Die. Grove had also conducted Weill's music for Railroads on Parade, which played five performances a day during the 1939 New York World's Fair.

The Hollywood Bowl performance on July 21, 1943, which was broadcast on NBC nationwide, was conducted by well-known film composer Franz Waxman. Unfortunately, none of the performing materials have survived, which would have provided clues as to how much the score was altered to accommodate the requirements of subsequent productions after the first two performances at Madison Square Garden in New York. Although this Hollywood Bowl broadcast describes the production as an exact replica of the New York production, the recorded text differs in some respects from Weill's copy of the script. One can hear music from The Eternal Road adapted as background music for the spoken texts and an orchestral version of Miriam's Song used for incidental music. Also included are sundry fanfares, successions of sustained chords, and fragments of Nazi music countered by arrangements of the "Hatikvah" and the "Warszawianka". The second section, Jews in the War, features a sequence of national anthems and melodies, including "Tipperary" and the "Red Army Song" by Lev Knipper, which is also known as Cavalry of the Steppes.

Because most of the musical sources have vanished, it is very difficult to reconstruct the music for We Will Never Die, short of transcribing what can be imperfectly heard on the radio recording.
