= The Jewish Record (Atlantic City) =

The Atlantic City Jewish Record was a weekly newspaper, published in Atlantic City, New Jersey. It was founded in 1939, and ended in 1996 or 1997.

Some of its articles were publicized on other news platforms.

In 1946 it was cited in US Congress regarding Ernest Bevin's statement.

On the play A Flag is Born, opened on September 5, 1946, Bernard Lerner's comment in the Atlantic City Jewish Record was of note.

S. W. Singer was editor and publisher in the 1950s.

It was superseded by Jewish Times of South Jersey Seashore (Pleasantville, NJ).
