= 1950 Israeli municipal elections =

Local elections in several municipalities and councils in Israel

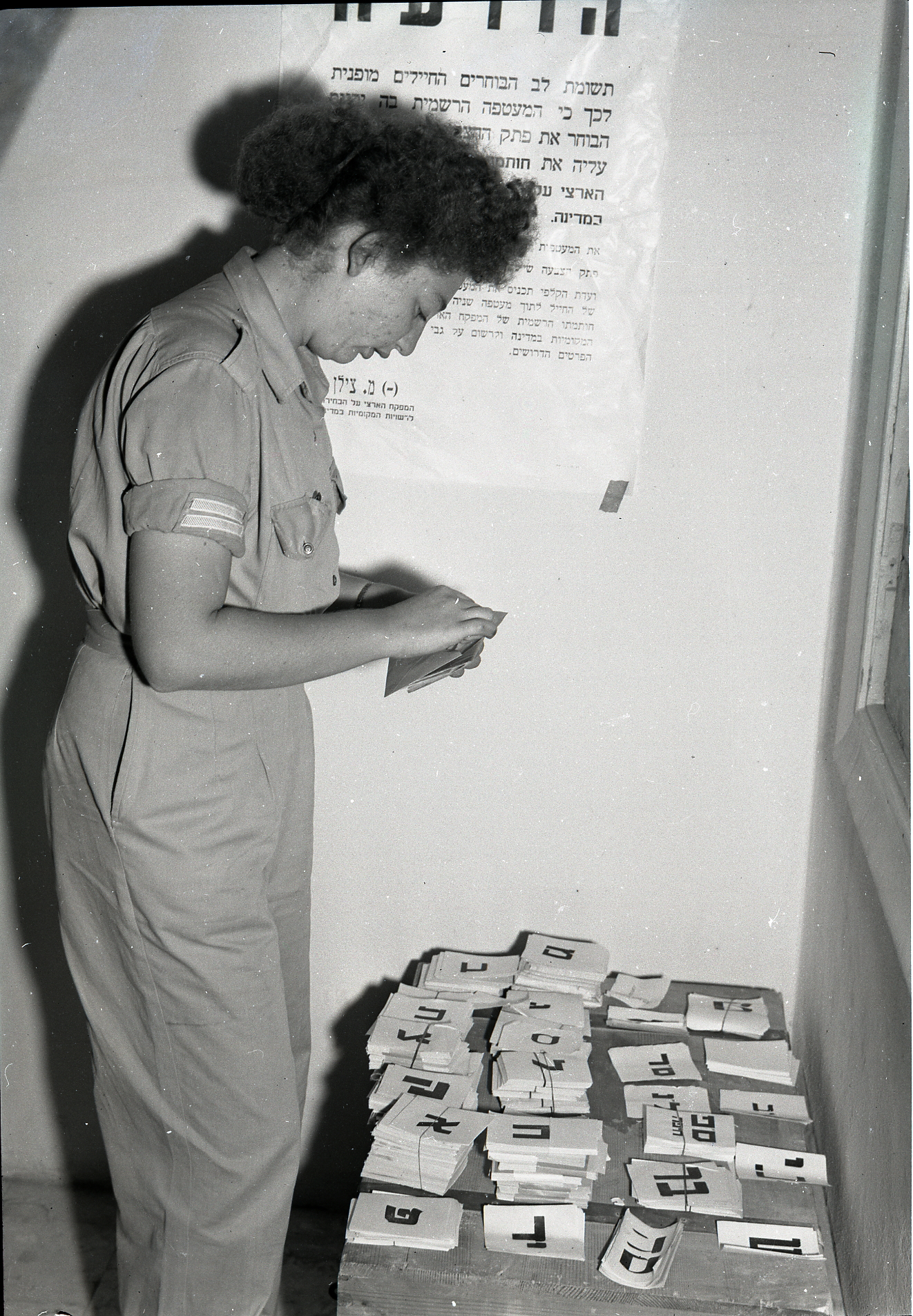
Female soldier voting in the 1950 municipal elections

Municipal elections took place in Israel for the first time on 14 November 1950. These elections were conducted in a matter similar to legislative elections, and turnout stood at approximately 80%. Due to pressure from the ruling party, Mapai, the voting age was lowered from 21 to 18. Mapai ran under the name 'the Histadrut list', which received criticism from Mapam. All religious parties ran as part of the United Religious Front. The General Zionists made significant gains when compared to their legislative power.

Mayors before the election had been chosen during the mandatory period. The elections were dominated by national parties, but some participating lists were local lists, who only participated in elections held in their own municipality.

== Elections by municipality ==
In Jerusalem, Mapai, led by Yitzhak Ben-Zvi and incumbent Mayor Daniel Auster won 5 out of 21 seats on the City Council, but were defeated by a right-wing coalition led by Shlomo Zalman Shragai, who became the Mayor. The United Religious Front and Center Party won four seats each, Herut and the Progressive Party won two seats each, Mapam and Pagi won one seat each, while two other parties were elected, winning a seat each. Maki did not win a seat on the Council.

Tel Aviv held its first election that included Jaffa, which were won by incumbent Mayor Israel Rokach, a member of the General Zionists who was first elected in 1936.

In Haifa, Abba Hushi, a member of Mapai, was elected Mayor, but was only sworn into office in January 1951, two months after the election.

In Petah Tikva, several Labour movements sought election to the council. The election resulted in a tie between the General Zionists (led by Yosef Sapir) and Mapai (led by Pinchas Rashish). Rashish was ultimately elected Mayor.

In Rishon LeZion, Mapai candidate Aryeh Sheftel formed a coalition with Mapam, unseating incumbent Mayor Elyakum Ostashinski. Sheftel later resigned due to poor health.

In Kfar Saba, Mapai won five seats, Mapam 3, Hapoel HaMizrachi 2 and the General Zionists one.

In Bnei Brak, the United religious party, led by incumbent Mayor Yitzchok Gerstenkorn won six out of 13 seats and formed a coalition with right-wing parties, leading to Gerstenkorn's re-election. Mapai and Mapam, who won a combined 4 seats, remained in the opposition.

In Tiberias, Mapai, led by Moshe Tsachar, won 5 out of 9 seats on the City Council, leading to Tsachar being elected mayor.

In Lod, Mapai, led by Pesach Lev, won 5 out of 11 seats on the City Couincil, leading to Lev being elected Mayor. The Progressive Party and Herut won no seats.
