= Aryeh Ben-Eliezer =

Israeli politician (1913–1970)

- אריה בן אליעזר
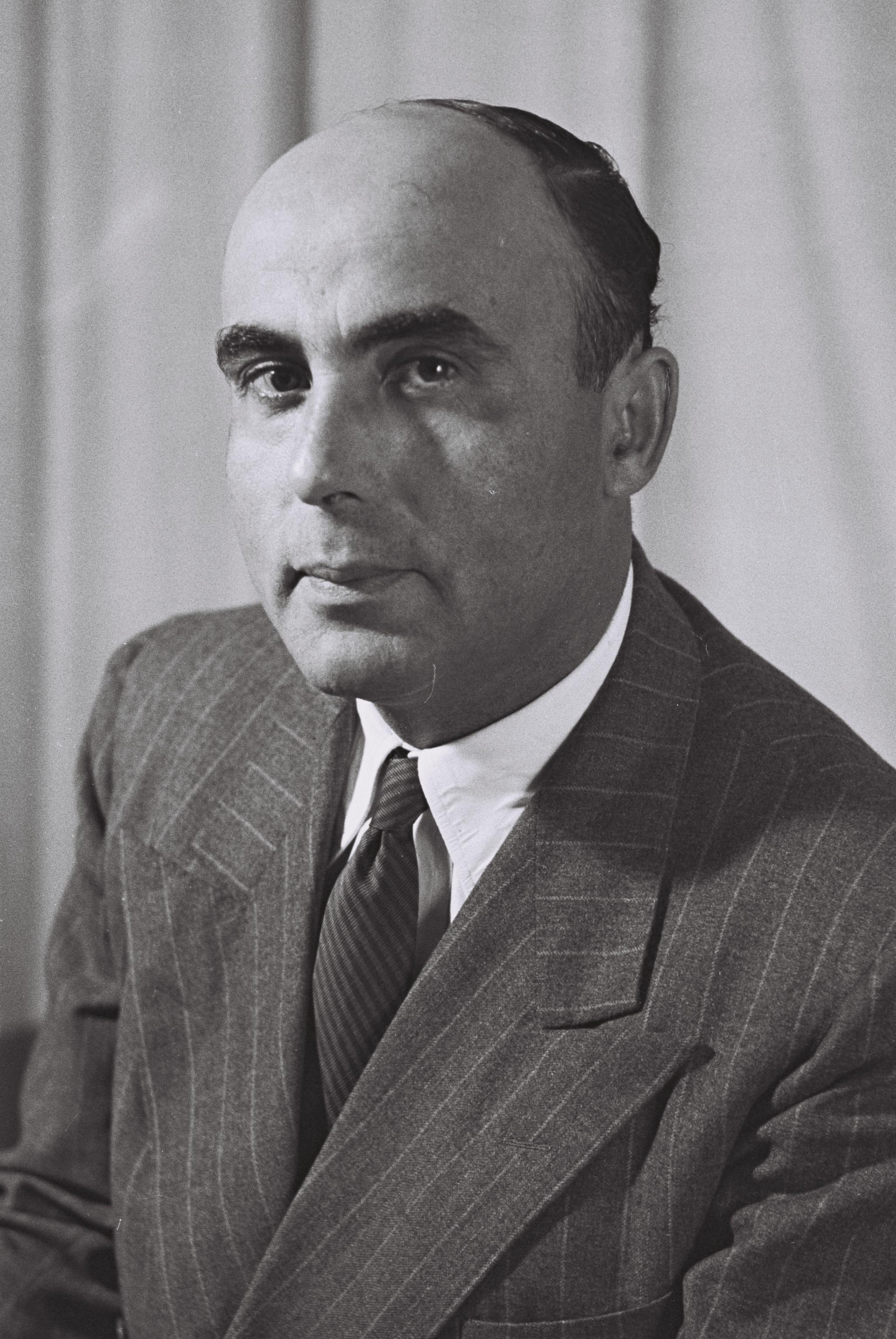

Acting Chairman of Herut
- In office 20 August 1951 – 7 January 1952
- Preceded by: Menachem Begin
- Succeeded by: Menachem Begin

Faction represented in the Knesset
- 1949–1953: Herut
- 1955–1965: Herut
- 1965–1970: Gahal

Personal details
- Born: 16 December 1913 Vilnius, Russian Empire
- Died: 29 January 1970 (aged 56) Israel
- Party: Herut
- Other political affiliations: Gahal

Aryeh Ben-Eliezer (Hebrew: אריה בן אליעזר; 16 December 1913 – 29 January 1970) was a Revisionist Zionist leader, Irgun member and Israeli politician. He was acting leader of Herut from August 1951, after Menachem Begin resigned as a result of the 1951 Israeli legislative election, until January 1952, when Ben-Eliezer's heart attack the previous month and the debate over the Reparations Agreement between Israel and the Federal Republic of Germany prompted Begin's return to political activity.

== Biography ==
Aryeh Ben-Eliezer (born Lipa Zabrowsky) was born in Vilnius in the Russian Empire (today in Lithuania). His family immigrated to Mandatory Palestine in 1920. He attended high schools in Tel Aviv. While the name "Ben-Eliezer" implies that Aryeh's father's name was "Eliezer", his father's name was actually "Binyomin Eliezer".

== Zionist activism ==
At the age of thirteen, he joined Betar and during the 1929 Palestine riots and the 1936 riots took an active part in the battle for Tel Aviv. Between 1932 and 1939 he served as an emissary for Betar and the Irgun in Poland, Romania and the Baltic countries. In 1933, he was arrested for five weeks under suspicion of being connected to Brit HaBirionim.

After the outbreak of World War II, he was sent on an Irgun mission to the United States and helped to found the Committee for the Creation of a Hebrew Army. Together with Hillel Kook, Ari Jabotinsky, Shmuel Merlin and Yitzhak Ben-Ami, he founded the "Committee for the Rescue of European Jewry" and later on the "Committee for National Liberation".

In 1943, he returned to Palestine on a mission for the Committee for the Rescue of European Jewry. He met with Menachem Begin, who asked him to become a member of the first Irgun General Headquarters. In April 1944 he was once again arrested by the British, and was one of 251 detainees exiled in October of that year to Asmara, Eritrea, where he was the representative of the exiles before the British authorities. In January 1947 he succeeded in escaping with several comrades and made his way to France, where he helped to organize the voyage of the Altalena.

== Political career ==
In 1948, he returned to the newly declared State of Israel and was among the founders and leaders of the Herut movement. He also helped establish Israel's relations with France. He was elected for Herut to the first through fifth Knessets, and for Gahal to the sixth and seventh. He was a member of the Finance, Economic Affairs, Foreign Affairs & Defense and Internal Affairs Committees, as well as Deputy Speaker of the Knesset. He was one of the first to propose a referendum as a proviso for crucial decisions, as part of his party's opposition to the Reparations Agreement between Israel and West Germany.

Ben-Eliezer suffered a serious heart attack in December 1952, causing a lengthy hospital stay. As a result of poor health he resigned from the Knesset in July 1953 and was replaced by Haim Cohen-Meguri. His health improved enough for him to stand in the July 1955 Israeli legislative election which returned him to the Knesset.

When Begin again announced his intention to resign as Herut chairman in 1966 after the party's disappointing result in the 1965 Israeli legislative election, Ben-Eliezer was a candidate to succeed him along with Shmuel Tamir. However, Begin was persuaded to reverse his decision in February 1967.

Ben-Eliezer died in 1970 while still an MK, and was replaced by Gideon Patt.

== Commemoration ==
The Israeli settlement of Beit Aryeh was named after him. A main street in Ramat Gan, is also named after him as well as Streets in Petah Tikva, Jerusalem, Beit Shemesh, Ashdod, Ashkelon, Netanya, Holon, Lod and Herzliya.

Party political offices
Preceded by Menachem Begin	Acting Leader of Herut; 1951–1952	Succeeded by Menachem Begin
