= Eri Jabotinsky =

Israeli politician

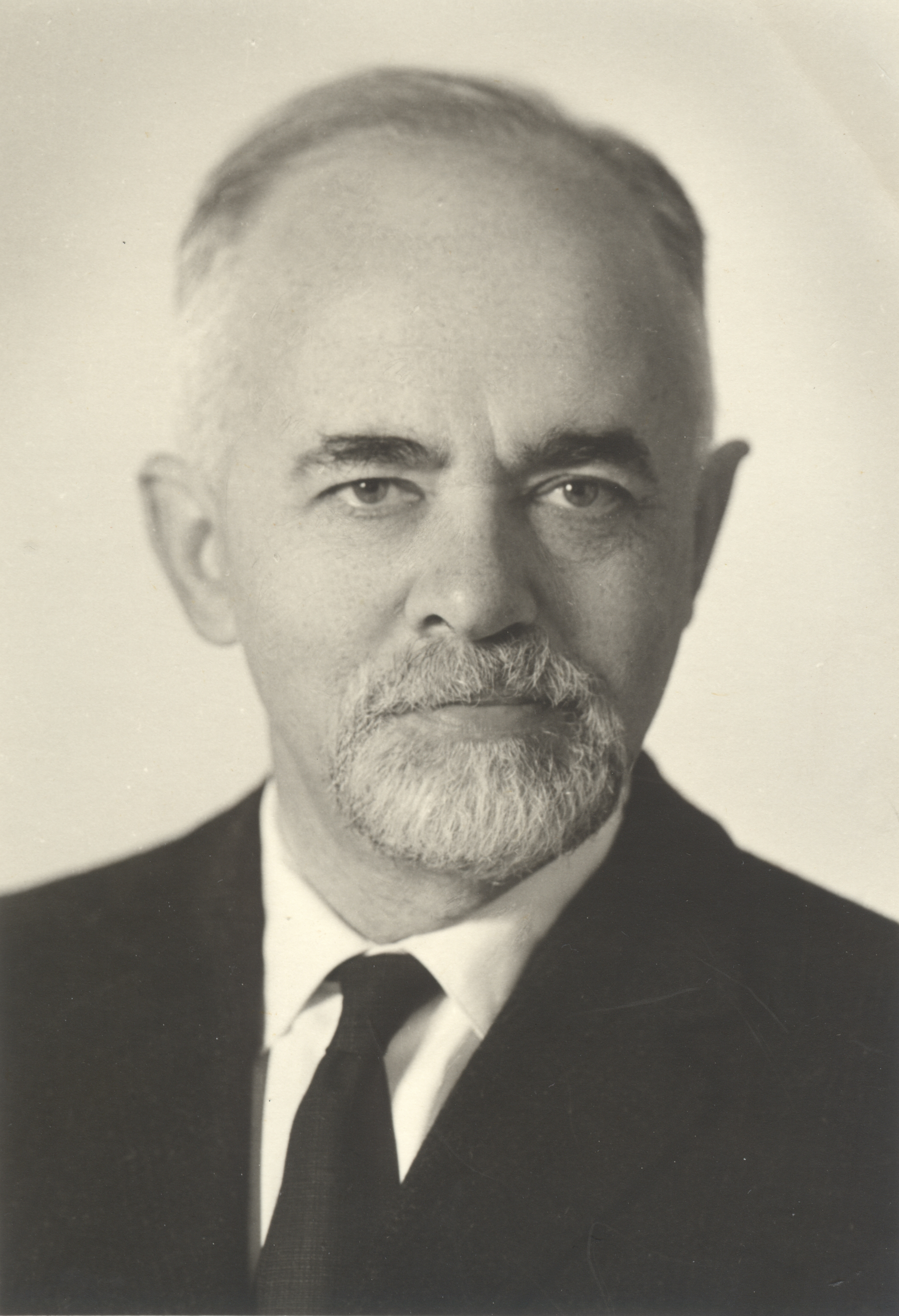

Faction represented in the Knesset
- 1949–1951: Herut
- 1951: Independent

Personal details
- Born: 26 December 1910 Odessa, Russian Empire
- Died: 6 June 1969 (aged 58) Haifa, Israel
- Parent: Ze'ev Jabotinsky (father)

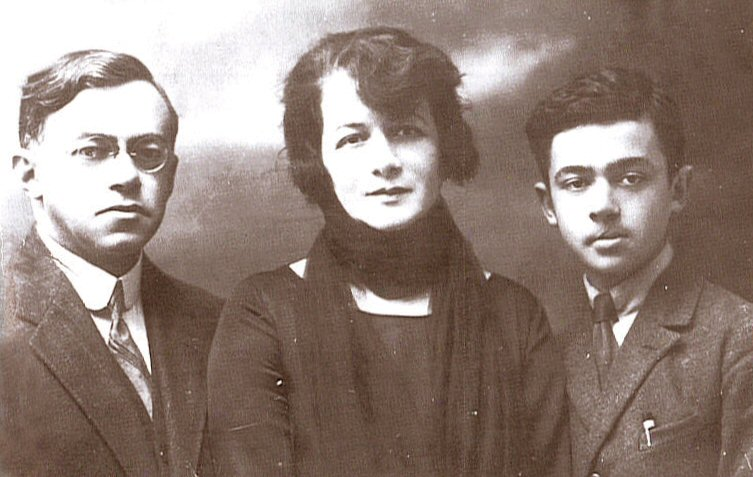
Jabotinsky (right) with his parents in the late 1920s

Eri Jabotinsky (Hebrew: עֵרִי זַ׳בּוֹטִינְסְקִי, also transliterated Ari, 26 December 1910 – 6 June 1969) was a Revisionist Zionist activist, Israeli politician and academic mathematician. He was the son of Ze'ev Jabotinsky, the founder of the opposition movement within Zionism at the time, and later served in the Knesset between 1949 and 1951 as a member of the opposition Herut party of Menachem Begin. Following his break with the party, he pursued his academic career. He published several works in mathematical iteration theory and was in his later life a professor in the Technion.

== Biography ==
Jabotinsky was born in Odessa in the Russian Empire in 1910. In 1919 the family emigrated to British-Mandate Palestine. Following the arrest of his father the following year, he moved to France, attending high school in Paris and later earning a degree in electrical engineering. Between 1933 and 1935 he worked as an engineer in an aircraft factory. In 1935 he returned to British Mandate Palestine, and worked as an engineer at the Naharayim power station in the Jordan Valley.

A long-term member of Revisionism's Betar youth movement, he became one of its representative leaders in 1936, and joined its worldwide board two years later. With Betar and the party's military wing, Irgun, he helped coordinate illegal Jewish immigration into British Mandate Palestine. He was arrested by the British authorities in November 1937 and imprisoned in Acre Prison until February 1938. He was later imprisoned again in 1940, and held for six months. Upon his release he moved to the United States, where his father died suddenly. There, together with Hillel Kook's 'Bergson Boys', Aryeh Ben-Eliezer, Shmuel Merlin and Yitzhak Ben-Ami among others, he founded the Emergency Committee to Save European Jewry. He briefly returned to British Mandate Palestine, but was again arrested by the British and expelled for illegal activities in 1944.

Following Israel's independence he returned to Israel in 1948, and was elected to the first Knesset the following year as a member of the Herut party's list of candidates. However, following disagreements over the party's direction and its new leadership by Menachem Begin, on 20 February 1951 Jabotinsky and Hillel Kook left Herut, and sat as independents for the rest of the term, although the move was not recognised by the House Committee.

After leaving the Knesset, he earned a PhD in mathematics in 1957 from the Hebrew University of Jerusalem. He also lectured on electricity theory at the Technion between 1955 and his death in 1969. He published several works on mathematical iteration theory and popularized Jabotinsky matrices. According to Detlef Gronau he is known for devising the "Jabotinsky equations".

He was the father-in-law of Anatoly Rubin.

== Academic publications ==
- Eri Jabotinsky (1971). "On the use of spherical means in hydrodynamics. Application to the study of the inception of turbulence". Israel Journal of Mathematics. 9 (1): 3–19T. doi:10.1007/BF02771614. S2CID 123551839.
- Eri Jabotinsky (1966). "Universal relations between the elements of Grunsky's matrix". Journal d'Analyse Mathématique. 17 (1): 411–417. doi:10.1007/BF02788667. S2CID 121576791.
- Eri Jabotinsky (1966). "$l$-sequences for nonembeddable functions". Proceedings of the American Mathematical Society. 17 (3): 738. doi:10.1090/S0002-9939-1966-0192034-X.
- Eri Jabotinsky (1963). "Analytic Iteration". Transactions of the American Mathematical Society. 108 (3): 457–477. doi:10.2307/1993593. JSTOR 1993593.
- Paul Erdös; Eri Jabotinsky (1960). "On analytic iteration". Journal d'Analyse Mathématique. 8 (1): 361–376. doi:10.1007/BF02786856. S2CID 15735066.
- Eri Jabotinsky (1953). "Representation of Functions by Matrices. Application to Faber Polynomials". Proceedings of the American Mathematical Society. 4 (4): 546–553. doi:10.2307/2032522. JSTOR 2032522.
