= Bernard Weinraub =

American journalist and playwright (born 1937)

- Born: December 19, 1937 (age 88); New York City, New York, U.S.
- Occupations: Journalist, playwright
- Spouses: Judith Weinraub (divorced); Amy Pascal (m. 1997)
- Children: 3

Bernard Weinraub (born December 19, 1937) is an American journalist and playwright.

== Early life and education ==
Weinraub was born in 1937 in New York City. His parents were Jewish immigrants from Eastern Europe. He graduated from the City College of New York with a Bachelor of Arts degree in English in 1959.

== Career ==
After graduating from college, he was drafted into the Army and served for two years on a newspaper. For most of his career he worked as a foreign correspondent with The New York Times including home bases in Saigon, London, Nairobi and New Delhi. He also covered the White House and the movie business in Los Angeles.

=== Journalism ===
He worked as a reporter for The New York Times. He started as a copyboy in his twenties, eventually being assigned as a foreign correspondent in Saigon, London, Belfast, Nairobi, New Delhi, then Washington, D.C., and Los Angeles. From 1991 to 2004, he covered the film industry in Los Angeles.

He retired in 2005, publishing an article about Hollywood and its values.

=== Theatre ===
==== The Accomplices ====
As a playwright, he published his first play, The Accomplices, in 2007. It dealt with the refusal of President Franklin D. Roosevelt's administration to admit more Jews during The Holocaust in World War II. The play was performed both in New York and Los Angeles, and was nominated for a Drama Desk Award. Los Angeles Times critic Charles McNulty said that "no one gets off the hook" in the play, including Weinraub's former employer The New York Times, except for Eleanor Roosevelt. He commended Weinraub's journalism skills but faulted "the phony telegraphic manner in which it’s dramatized."

In the Times, which was negatively mentioned in the play, critic David Ng faulted Accomplices as "a mind-numbing history lesson" and a "soporific lecture of a play."

==== Above the Fold ====
His second play, out in 2014, was Above the Fold. Based on the Duke lacrosse case, it shows the struggles of an African American journalist who realizes the scandal is phony while covering it. It premiered at the Pasadena Playhouse in Pasadena, California. It was directed by Steven Robman and the lead actress was Taraji P. Henson.

== Personal life ==
He has been married twice. He has two children, a son and a daughter, from his first marriage to Judith Weinraub. He met Amy Pascal, a film industry executive, at The Peninsula Beverly Hills in 1996; they were married in 1997, and have a son. They reside in Brentwood, a Western suburb of Los Angeles, California.

== Bibliography ==
- Bylines (Doubleday, 1982).
