= Kriukai =

- Town
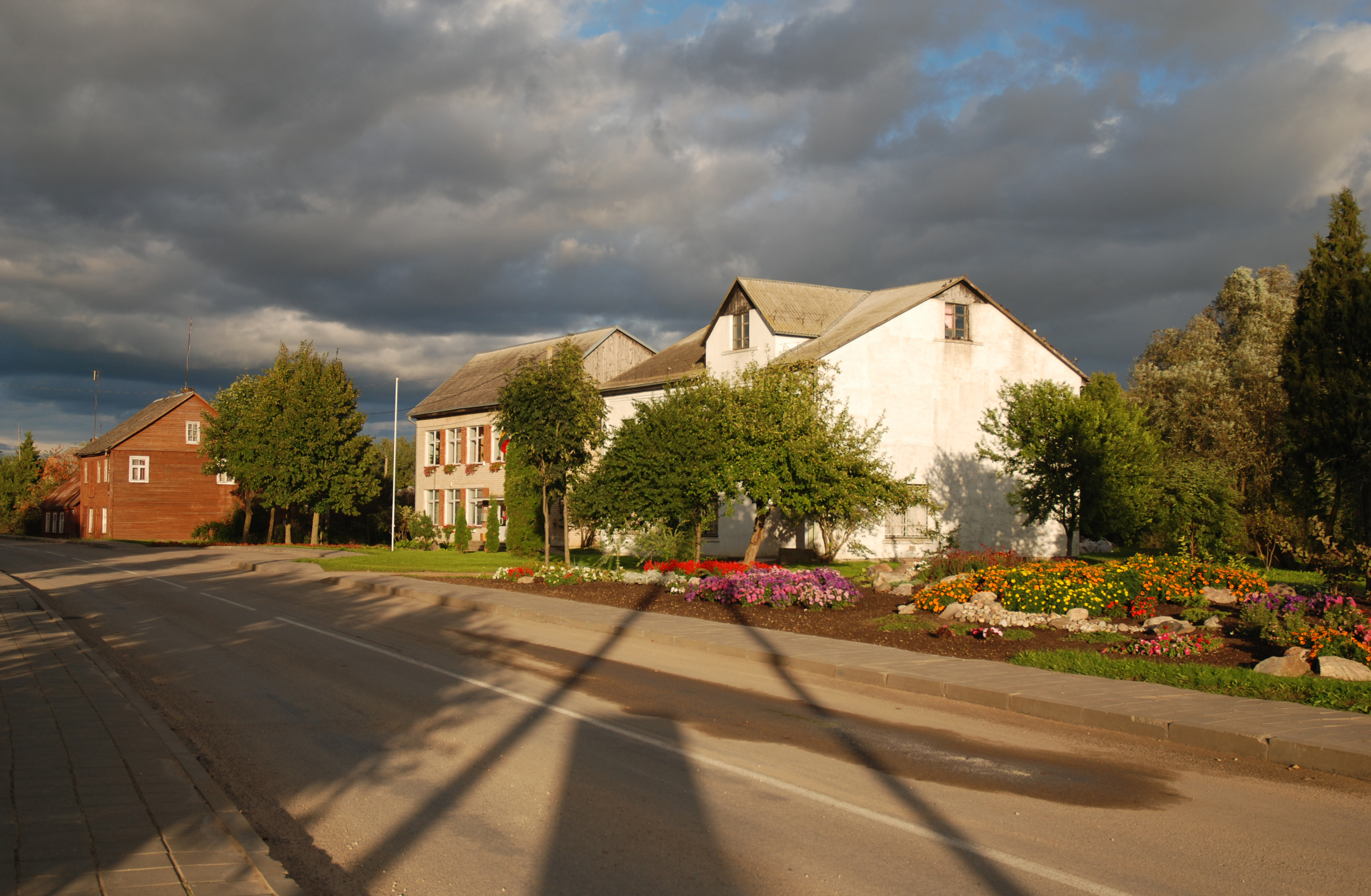

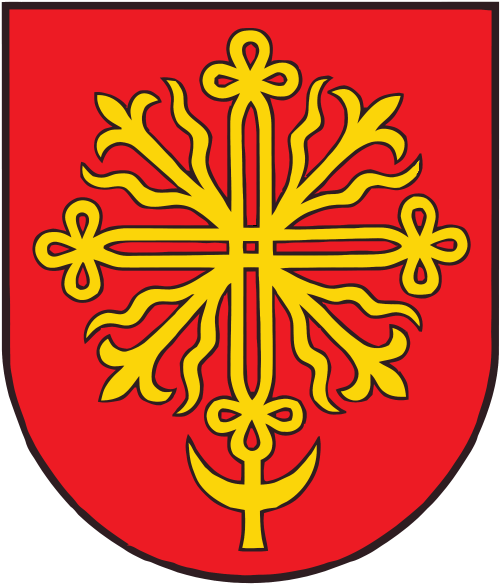
- Coat of arms

- Location in Lithuania
- Coordinates: 56°18′0″N 23°49′40″E
- Country: Lithuania
- Ethnographic region: Samogitia
- County: Šiauliai County

Population (2011)
  - Total: 533
- Time zone: UTC+2 (EET)
  - Summer (DST): UTC+3 (EEST)

Kriukai (Samogitian: Kriokā) is a small town in Šiauliai County and in Joniškis District Municipality (Joniškio rajono savivaldybė) in northern Lithuania. In 2011, it had a population of 533.

== Gallery ==
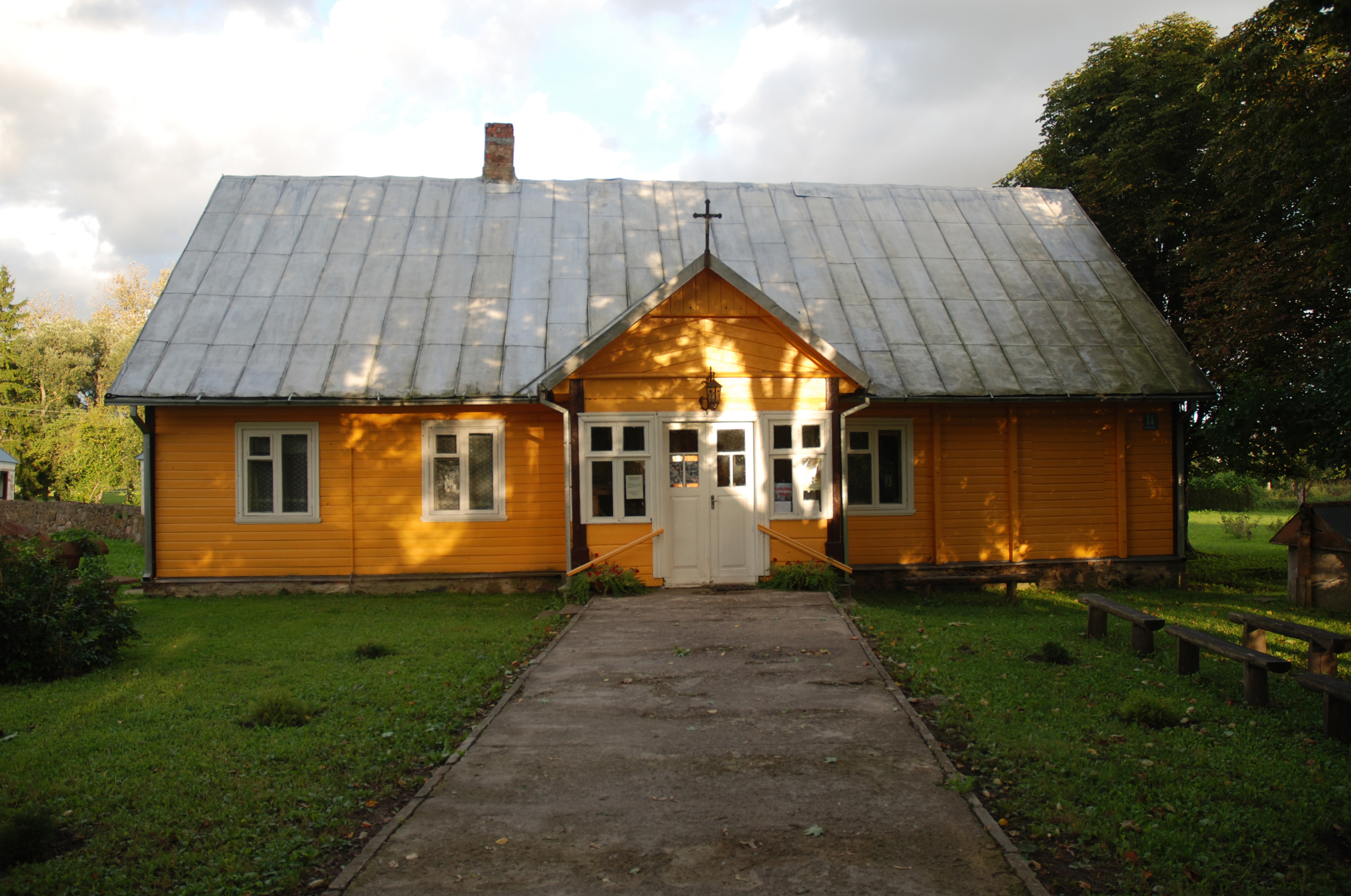
Kriukai chapel (St. Laurence's Church)

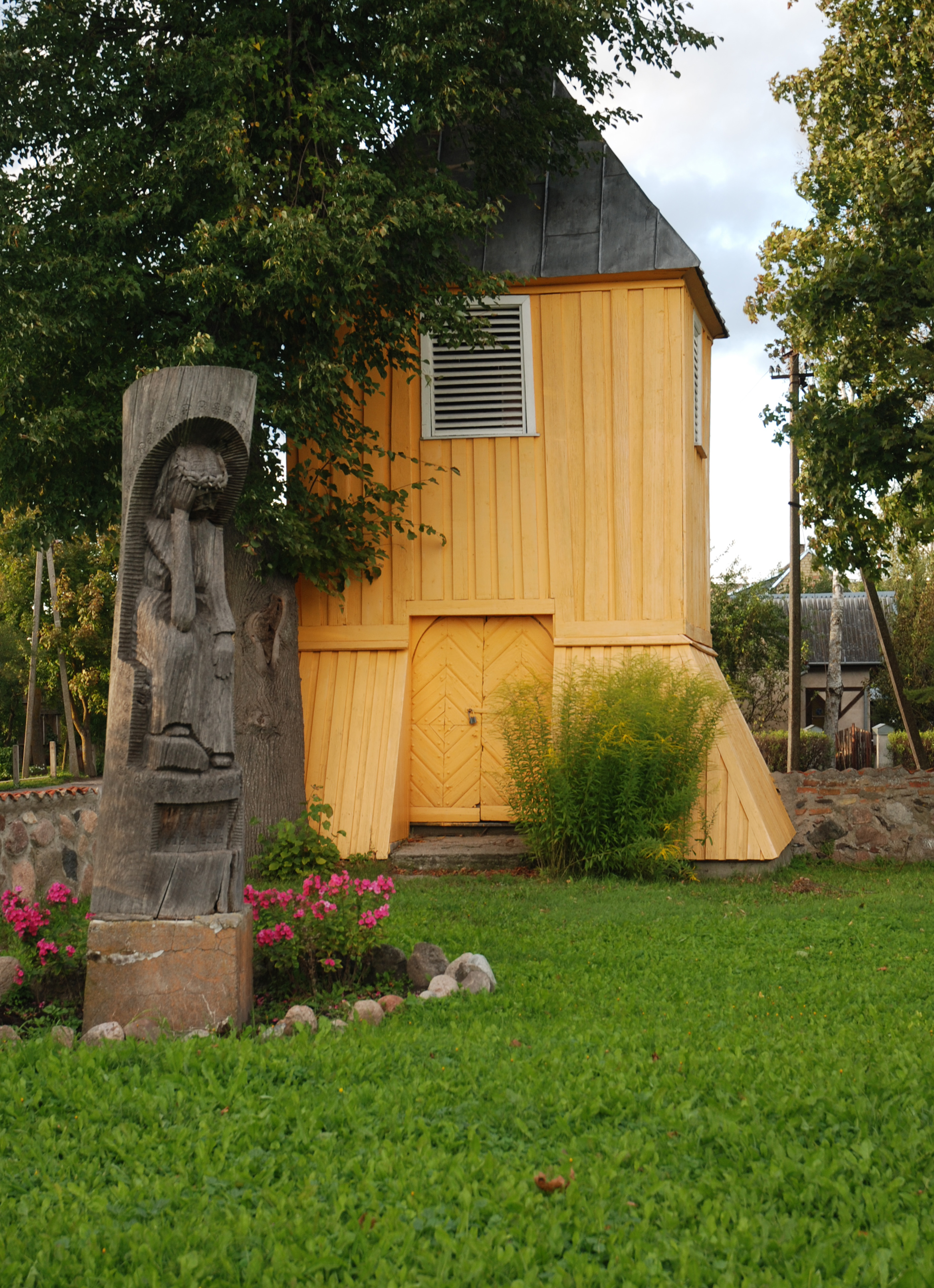
Kriukai church belfry

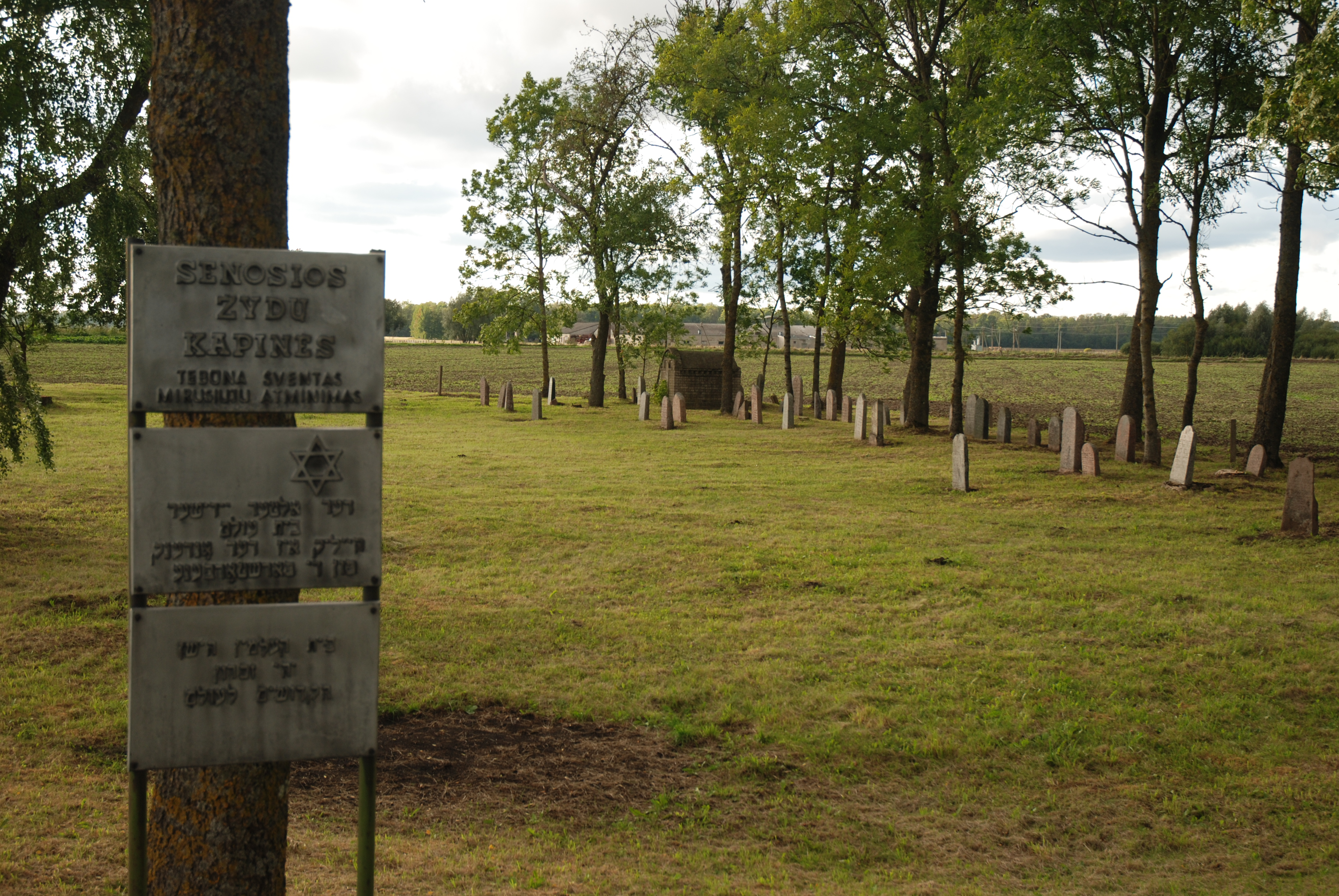
Old Jewish cemetery
