= Herut =

Political party in Israel (1948–1988)

Herut חֵרוּת
- Leader: Menachem Begin (1948–1951); Aryeh Ben-Eliezer (acting 1951–1952); Menachem Begin (1952–1983); Yitzhak Shamir (1983–1988)
- Founded: 15 June 1948; 78 years ago
- Dissolved: 1988; 38 years ago
- Merged into: Likud
- Headquarters: Tel Aviv
- Newspaper: Herut
- Ideology: National conservatism; Revisionist Zionism
- Political position: Right-wing to far-right
- National affiliation: Gahal (1965–1973); Likud (1973–1988)
- Most MKs: 28 (1981, 1984)

Election symbol

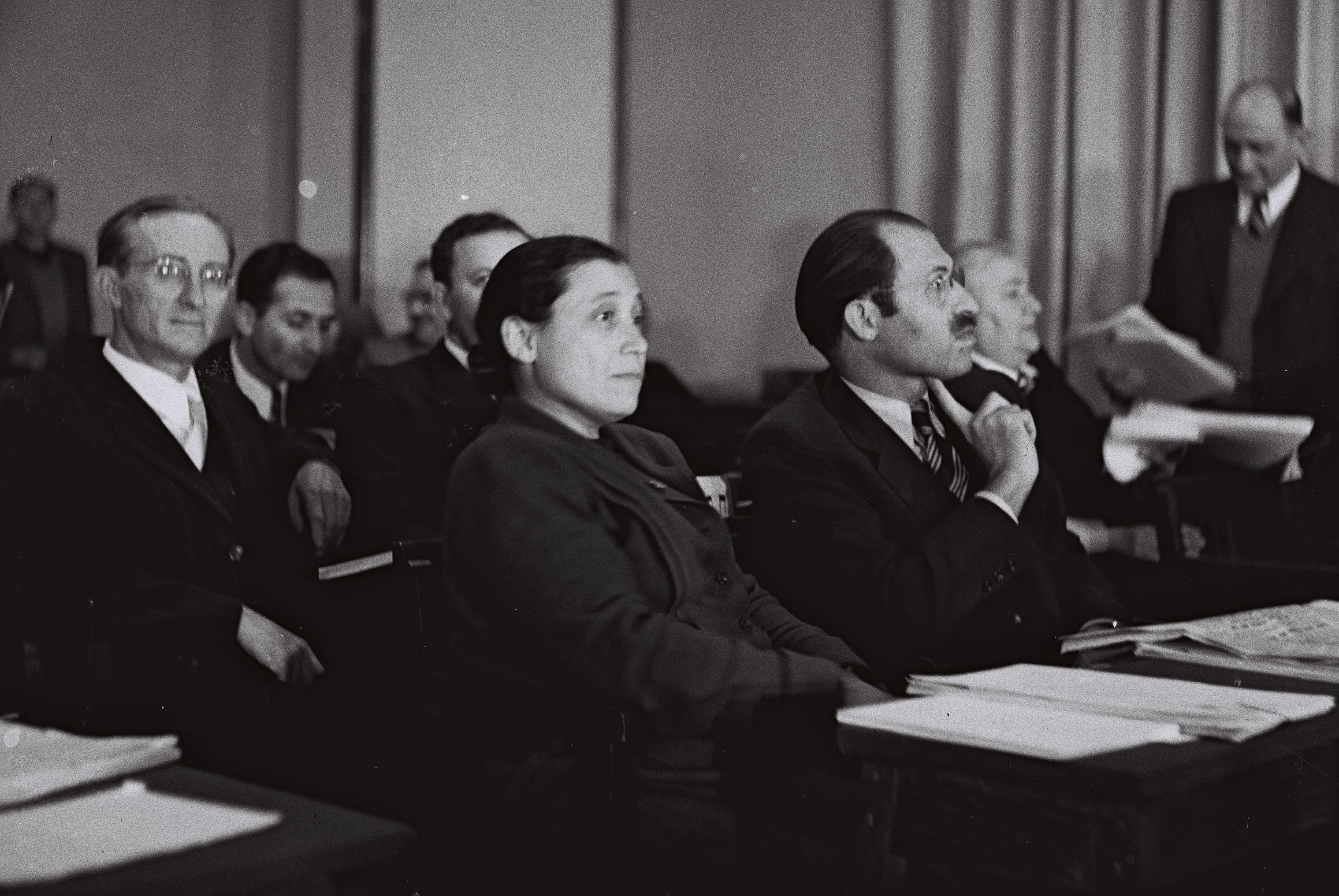
Herut MKs Uri Zvi Greenberg, Esther Raziel Naor, and Menachem Begin, at the first meeting of the Knesset in Jerusalem

Herut (Hebrew: חֵרוּת, lit. 'Freedom') was the major conservative nationalist political party in Israel from 1948 until its formal merger into Likud in 1988. It was an adherent of Revisionist Zionism.

== History ==
=== Early years ===
==== Foundation and platform ====
Herut was founded by Menachem Begin on 15 June 1948 as a successor to the Revisionist Irgun, a militant group in Mandate Palestine. The new party was a challenge to the Hatzohar party established by Ze'ev Jabotinsky. Herut also established an eponymous newspaper, with many of its founding journalists defecting from Hatzohar's HaMashkif.

Objection to withdrawal of the Israel Defense Forces (IDF) and negotiations with Arab states formed the party's main platform in the first Knesset election. The party vigorously opposed the ceasefire agreements with the Arab states until the annexation of Gaza Strip and the West Bank, both before and after the election. Herut differentiated itself by refusing to recognise the legitimacy of the Kingdom of Jordan after the armistice, and frequently used the slogan "Two banks of the Jordan River" in claiming Israel's right to the whole of Eretz Israel/Palestine because of their historical significance in religious Jewish texts. According to Joseph Heller, Herut was a one-issue party intent on expanding Israel's borders.

Herut's socio-economic platform represented a clear shift to the right, with support for private initiative, but also for legislation preventing the trusts from exploiting workers. Begin was at first careful not to appear anti-socialist, stressing his opposition to monopolies and trusts, and also demanding that "all public utility works and basic industries must be nationalized". Herut was from the outset inclined to sympathise with the underdog, and, according to Hannah Torok Yablonka, "tended to serve as a lodestone for society's misfits".

==== 1949 elections ====
Herut's political expectations were high as the first election approached in 1949. It took credit for driving the British government out and as a young movement, reflecting the esprit of the nation, it perceived its image as being more attractive than the old establishment. They hoped to win 25 seats, which would place them second and make them leader of the opposition, with potential for a future gain of government power. This analysis was shared by other parties. At the elections, Herut only won 14 seats with 11.5 percent of the votes, making it the fourth-largest party in the Knesset; Hatzohar, on the other hand, failed to cross the electoral threshold of 1 percent and disbanded shortly thereafter.

==== Opposition to Herut ====
Though practical differences between the two parties were less dramatic than the rhetoric suggested, both the Labor Zionist establishment and the opposition Herut emphasised those differences to mobilise their voters.

The hostility between Begin and Israel's first Prime Minister, the Mapai leader David Ben-Gurion, which had begun over the Altalena Affair, was evident in the Knesset. Ben-Gurion coined the phrase "without Herut and Maki" (Maki was the Communist Party of Israel), a reference to his position that he would include any party in his coalition, except those two. In fact, Herut was approached at least three times (1952, 1955, and 1961) by Mapai for government negotiations; Begin turned down each offer, suspecting that they were designed to divide his party. The ostracism also expressed itself in the Prime Minister's refusal to refer to Begin by name from the Knesset Podium, using instead the phrase "the person who sits next to M. K. Badar", and boycotting his Knesset speeches.

Ben-Gurion's policy of ostracising Revisionism was performed systematically, as seen in the legal exclusion of fallen Irgun and Lehi fighters from public commemoration and from benefits to their families. Herut members were excluded from the highest bureaucratic and military positions.

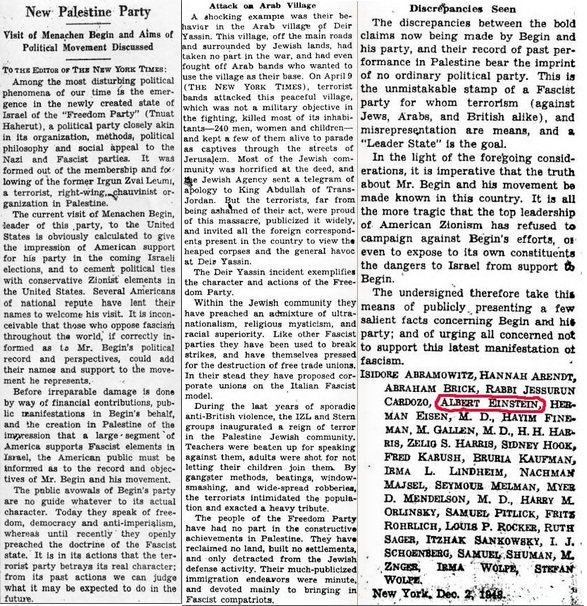
An open letter to The New York Times. The letter was signed by over twenty prominent Jewish intellectuals, including Albert Einstein, Hannah Arendt, Zellig Harris, and Sidney Hook.

Herut also met fierce resistance from the broader Jewish diaspora. When Begin visited New York City in December 1948 over twenty prominent Jewish intellectuals, including Albert Einstein, Hannah Arendt, Zellig Harris, and Sidney Hook signed an open letter to The New York Times. The letter condemned Herut and Begin for their part in the Deir Yassin massacre and likened the party "in its organization, methods, political philosophy and social appeal to the Nazi and Fascist parties" and accused it of preaching "an admixture of ultranationalism, religious mysticism, and racial superiority".

==== Decline ====
In the municipal elections of 1950, Herut lost voters to the centrist General Zionists, who also attracted disillusioned voters from Mapai and established themselves as a tough opposition rival to Herut. At the second national convention, Begin was challenged by more radical elements of his party. They wanted a more dynamic leadership, and thought he had adapted himself to the system. At the convention, Begin's proposal to send children abroad for security reasons, although there was a precedent for such a measure, sounded defeatist, and it was unanimously rejected. It was considered to have hurt the party's image. In March 1951, Herut lost two of its Knesset seats, with the defection of Ari Jabotinsky and Hillel Kook from the party to sit as independent MKs. Referring to previous written commitments, the party sought to revoke its Knesset membership, but the issue was still not settled by the next election three months later.

Critics of the party leadership pointed out that the party had changed and lost its status as a radical avant-garde party. Uncompromising candidates had been removed from the party list for the upcoming elections, economic questions loomed large in the propaganda, and Mapai had co-opted some of the Herut agenda, not least by declaring Jerusalem as Israel's capital. These critics and outside commentators thought that Herut seemed irrelevant.

In the 1951 elections, Herut won eight seats, six less than previously. Begin resigned as leader, a move he had considered before the election because of the internal criticism. He was replaced by Aryeh Ben-Eliezer, whose leadership was nipped in the bud when he suffered a heart attack in late 1951. Ya'akov Rubin became party secretary general. Despite sending the party his resignation letter in August 1952 and going abroad to Europe, the party's national council voted instead to make Ben-Eliezer deputy chairman and grant Begin a six month leave of absence. Begin did not return to public life until January 1952, prompted to do so by the growing debate around the Reparations Agreement between Israel and the Federal Republic of Germany.

As a young party without institutions paralleling those of Mapai, who were predominant in most areas of social life, Herut was at a serious disadvantage. Its leaders were politically inexperienced and clung to the principle of not – as representatives of the entire nation – accepting financial support from any interest groups. They were prevented from building a strong and competent party structure because of this.

=== Begin's return ===
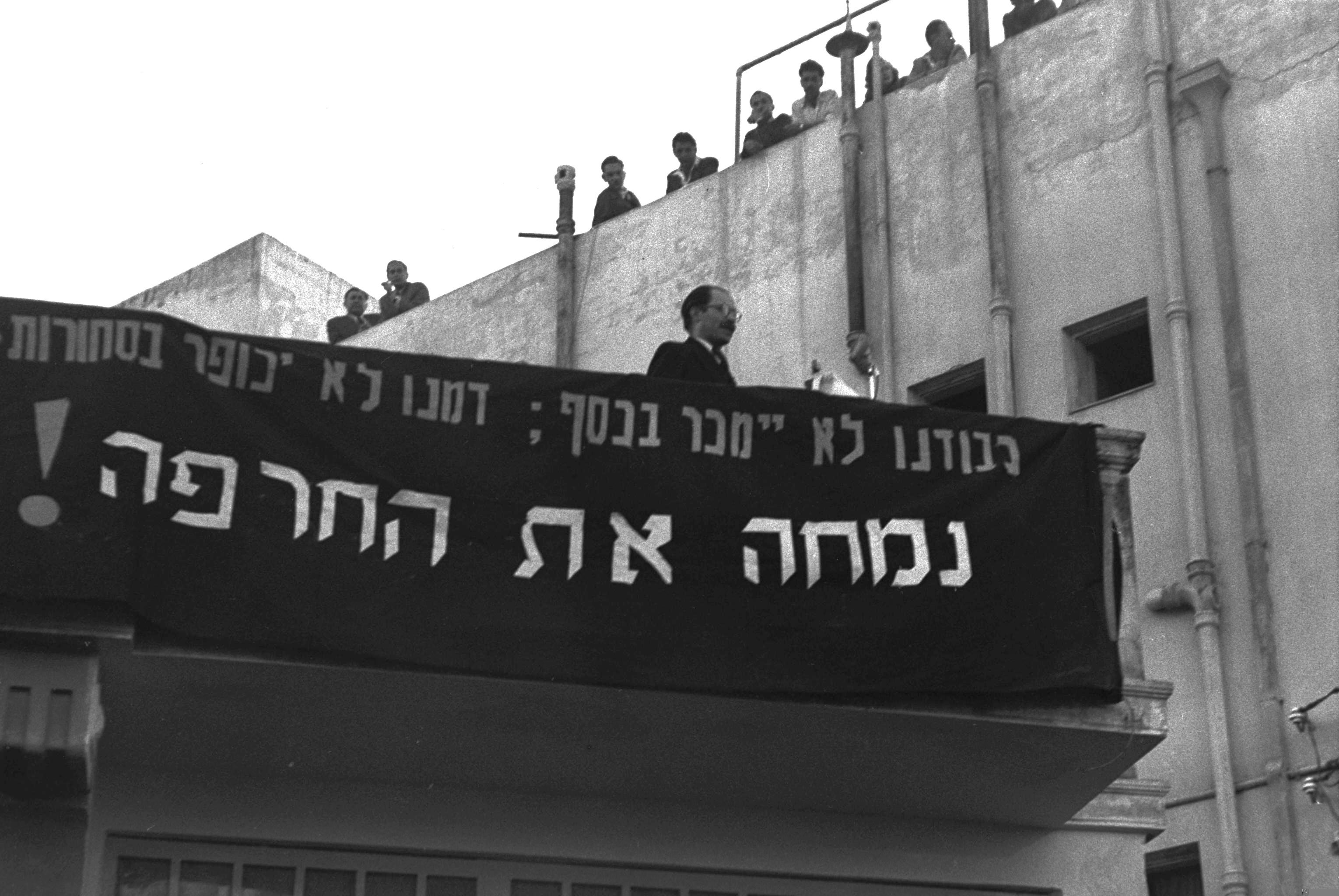
Menachem Begin addressing a mass demonstration against negotiations with Germany in Tel Aviv 1952

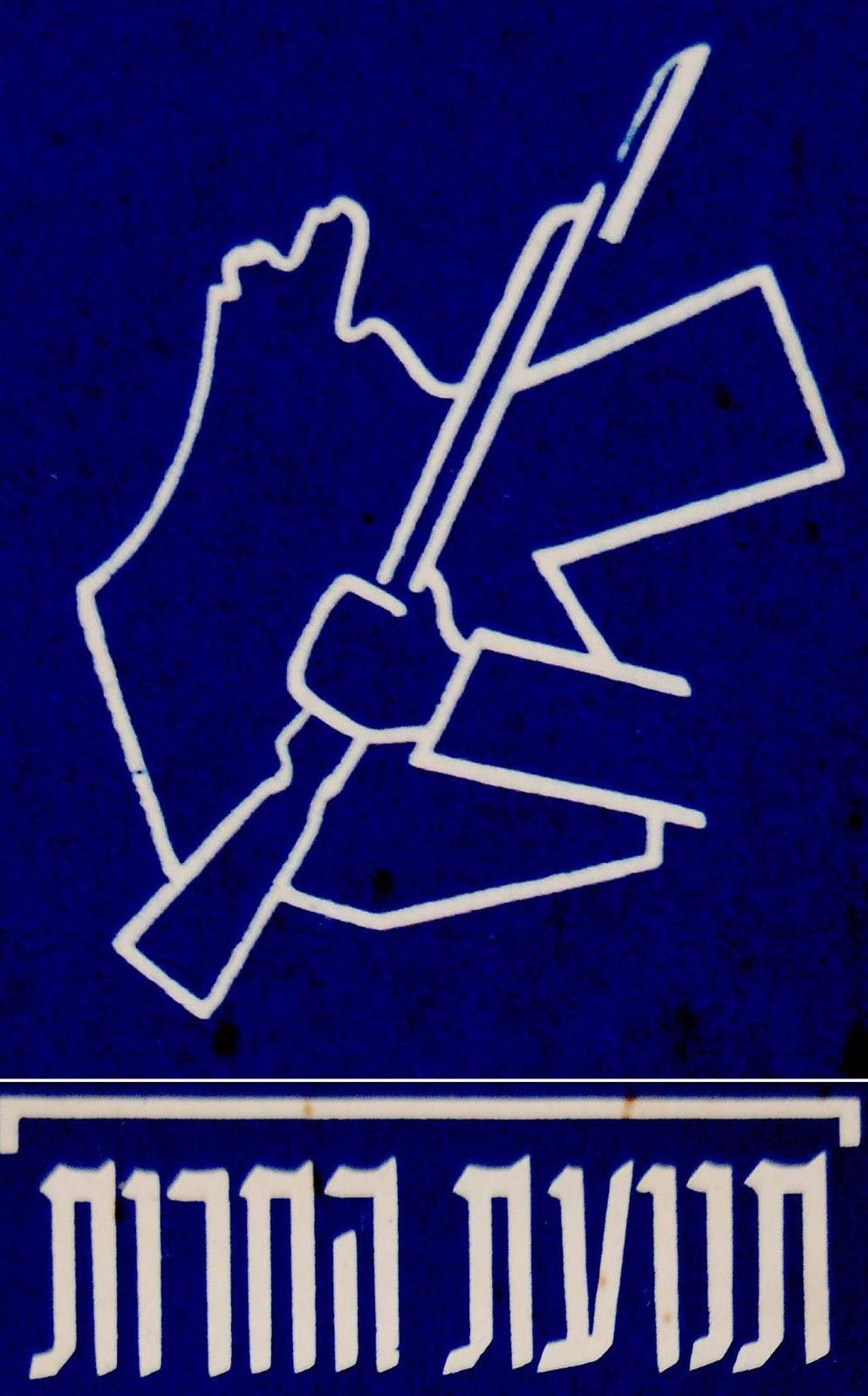
Party membership card in 1956. Note similar logo as the Irgun

The Reparations Agreement between Israel and West Germany of 1952 brought Begin back into politics. It gave the party new momentum, and it proved an effective weapon against the General Zionists. The Reparations Agreement awoke strong sentiments in the nation, and Begin encouraged civil disobedience during the debate on the affair. The largest demonstrations gathered 15,000 people, and Herut reached far beyond its own constituency. The party let the issue fade from the agenda only after having wrested a maximum of political capital from it.

The third national convention included a fierce debate about democracy and legitimate political actions. There was strong sentiment in favour of using the barricades, but Begin vigorously resisted it. The government of the nation, he claimed, could only be established via the ballot box. The convention gave Begin important legitimacy by sending a message to the public that the party was law-abiding and democratic. At the same time, it secured the support of the hard-liners who would not compromise on its principles.

Economic and fiscal policy were given greater emphasis, and the party attacked the Histadrut for its dual role as employer and trade union. It proposed to outlaw such concentration of power and also abolish party control of agricultural settlements. Herut reasoned that workers were empowered by private enterprise. A 25 per cent tax cut was also envisioned.

In the 1955 election, the party nearly doubled its seats to 15, and became the second-largest party in the Knesset, behind Mapai. Apart from an improved campaign, the accomplishment was attributed to the activist party platform in a situation of deteriorating security, to more support from recent immigrants and other disgruntled elements, and to disillusionment with the economic situation. The Kastner trial also played into Herut's hands, when, together with Maki, they helped bring down Moshe Sharett's government in 1954 through a motion of no-confidence over the government's position in the trial.

Herut added another seat in the 1959 elections, feeding on feelings of resentment against the dominant left that existed mainly among new Sephardi and Mizrahi immigrants. The party failed, however, to maintain the momentum of the previous election, and to make substantial gains, as had been hoped. As the young nation grew stronger, the public did not feel the same existential dread, lessening the impact of Herut's activist message, especially after the Suez Crisis, in which Ben-Gurion's performance was perceived favourably. The Wadi Salib riots a few months before the election caused the government to play the role of maintainer of law and order, which resonated well among the middle class. Mapai exploited the situation successfully by depicting Begin as dangerous.

=== Gahal alliance ===
Herut helped bring down the government again in 1961 when they and the General Zionists tabled a motion of no confidence over the government's investigation into the earlier Lavon Affair; in the resulting 1961 election, the party maintained its 17 seats. Toward the end of the Fifth Knesset in 1965, and in preparation for the upcoming election, Herut joined with the Liberal Party (itself a recent merger of the General Zionists and the Progressive Party) to form Gahal (a Hebrew acronym for the Herut-Liberal Bloc (Hebrew: גוש חרות-ליברלים, Gush Herut-Liberalim)), although each party remained independent within the alliance. The merger helped moderate Herut's political isolation and created a right-wing opposition bloc with a broader base and more realistic chance to lead the government. The full alliance did not survive, however, because seven members of the Liberal Party, mostly former Progressives, soon defected from the Liberals and formed the Independent Liberals; they disagreed with the merger, identifying Herut and Begin as too right-wing. Mapai also experienced defections at the time, and the Knesset session closed with Gahal holding 27 seats, second only to Mapai's remaining 34.

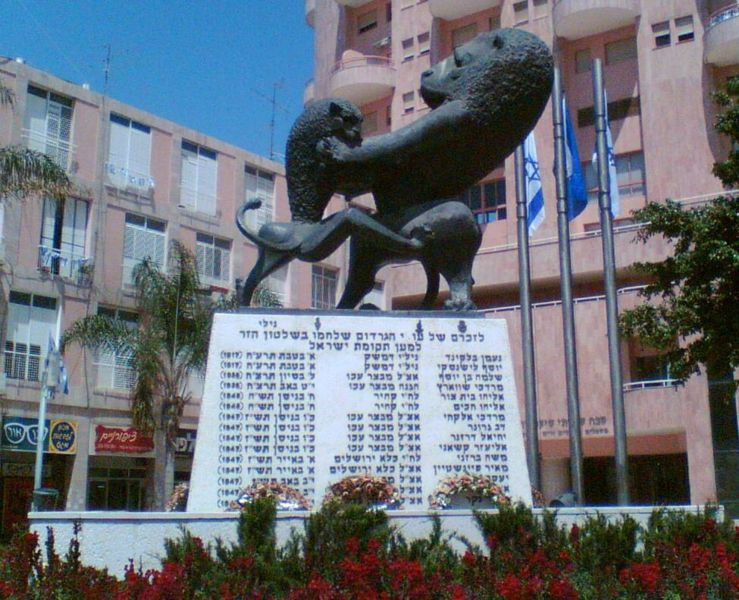
Monument in memory of the eight members of Irgun and the two members of Lehi hanged by British authorities between 1938 and 1947. Under Ben-Gurion, public commemoration of fallen Irgun and Lehi militants was strictly refused. Under Levi Eskhol, however, they began to be rehabilitated, indicating a more equal status for Revisionism and Herut.

Over time, the public perception of both Herut and its leader had changed, despite the ostracism imposed by Prime Minister Ben-Gurion. Begin had remained the main opposition figure, against the dominant politicians of the left, particularly in debates regarding such heated issues as the Lavon investigation and Israel's relationships to Germany. This prominence evaded much of the ostracism's impact, and Ben-Gurion's hostility became ever more savage. He eventually started to liken Begin to Hitler – an attitude that backfired, making Begin to stand out as a victim. The political climate took a favourable turn for Revisionism and Herut in mid-1963, when Levi Eshkol replaced Ben-Gurion as Prime and Defense Minister. A government resolution in March 1964 calling for the reinterment of Zeev Jabotinsky's remains in Israel attests to this. Fallen Irgun and Lehi militants also began to be commemorated more equally, with their reputations being rehabilitated.

In the 1965 elections, Gahal won only 26 seats, well below that of the left's new Alignment, which won 45. In Herut's search for a scapegoat, its leadership was questioned by many; they considered that Begin, despite his achievements, brought an indelible stigma from his militant days before and around independence, scaring off voters. Internal opposition arose, and Herut's eighth convention in June 1966 became turbulent. The opposition group sensed that Begin's leadership position was too strong to challenge; so, they concentrated on winning control over the party organization. They won overwhelming victories in all votes for the composition of party institutions. Begin responded by putting his own political future at stake. He threatened to leave the party chair, and maybe also his seat in the Knesset. Begin's move mobilized delegates in emphatic support for him, but the party convention still ended with great internal tension, and without a party chairman; the chair would be vacant for eight months. Party opposition to Begin' leadership came to a showdown a month after the convention, when Haim Amsterdam, an assistant to one of the opposition leaders, Shmuel Tamir, published a devastating attack on Begin in Ha'aretz; this led to the suspension of Tamir's party membership. The leaders of the opposition then established a new party in the Knesset, the Free Center, with the loss of three seats for Herut. After this revolt, Begin returned to party leadership.

=== Government participation ===
Gahal joined the government on the first day of the Six-Day War, with both Begin and the Liberal's Yosef Sapir becoming a Minister without Portfolio; Ben-Gurion's Rafi also joined, with Moshe Dayan becoming Defense Minister. The national unity government was Begin's own brainchild. This had a significant positive effect on his image. Critics agree that it was a major turning point in Herut's road to power, since it granted it the legitimacy it had been denied up until then. The national unity government was more than an emergency solution in a time of existential danger; it reflected a relaxation of ideological tension, which enabled the government to outlive the emergency. Moreover, Begin and Ben-Gurion were reconciled. Ben-Gurion needed him in his bitter rivalry with Eshkol and Begin surprised his adversary by proposing to Eshkol that he should step aside in favor of Ben-Gurion as the leader of an emergency government. The proposition was turned down, but Ben-Gurion, who recently had compared Begin to Hitler, now praised his responsibility and patriotism.

The outcome of the war strengthened Herut. The principle of the indivisibility of the land had seemed like an archaic principle with little practical significance, but now, it emerged from the fringe of consciousness to the core of national thought. Begin saw it as his first mission in the government to secure the fruits of the victory by preventing territorial withdrawal and promoting settlement.

Despite the breakaway of the Free Center, Gahal retained its representation in the Knesset in the 1969 elections, and several of their candidates were elected as mayors. Herut was included in the new government of Golda Meir with six ministers (out of 24). The recruitment of Major-General Ezer Weizman, the first general to join Herut and a nephew of Israel's first President, was a considerable public relations achievement. The Government participation did not last long, since Gahal left in early 1970 over the acceptance of the Rogers Plan, which included approval of the United Nations Security Council Resolution 242, a move that was largely dictated by Begin.

=== Merging into Likud ===
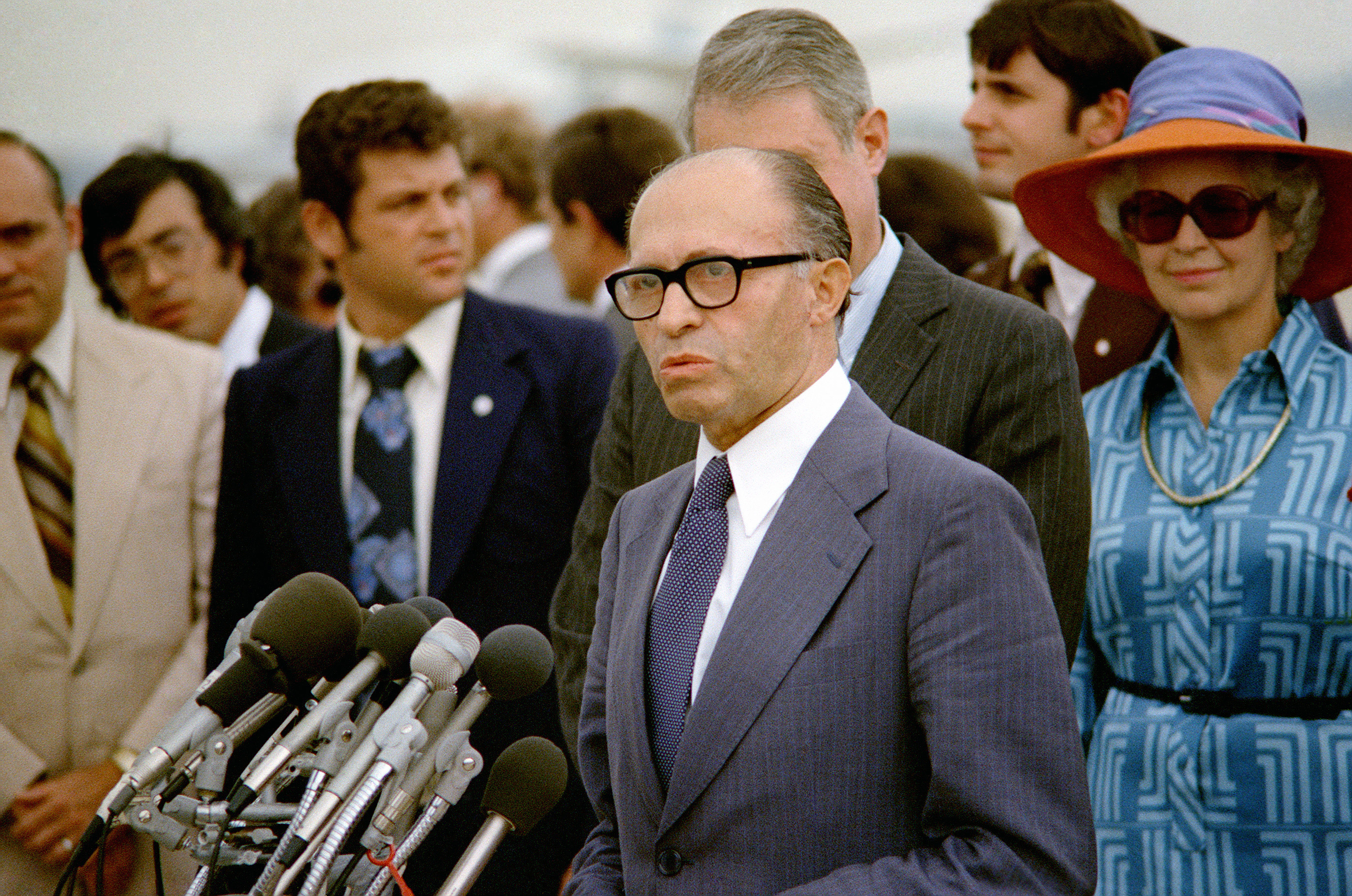
In the 1977 elections, Herut, now part of Likud, came into power, with its leader at the time Menachem Begin becoming Prime Minister.

In September 1973, Gahal merged with the Free Centre, the National List and the non-parliamentary Movement for Greater Israel to create Likud, again with all parties retaining their independence within the union. Within Likud, Herut continued to be the dominant party. In the 1973 elections, Likud capitalized on the government's neglect in the Yom Kippur War, and gained seven seats, totalling 39.

In the following years, Likud sharply criticized the government's accords with Egypt and Syria. Stormy demonstrations were organized in conjunction with Gush Emunim, signifying an important political alliance. In the 1977 elections, Likud emerged victorious, with 43 seats, the first time the right had won an election. Begin became Prime Minister, retaining his post in the 1981 elections. In 1983, he stood down, and Yitzhak Shamir took over as Herut (and, therefore, Likud) party leader and Prime Minister.

Herut was finally disbanded in 1988, when Likud dissolved its internal factions to become a unitary party.

== Knesset election results ==
Election	Leader	Votes	%	Place	Seats won	+/−	Status
1949	Menachem Begin	49,782	11.5	4th	14 / 120	New	Opposition
1951	Menachem Begin	45,651	6.5	5th	8 / 120	▼6	Opposition
1955	Menachem Begin	107,190	12.6	2nd	15 / 120	▲9	Opposition
1959	Menachem Begin	130,515	13.5	2nd	17 / 120	▲2	Opposition
1961	Menachem Begin	138,599	13.8	2nd	17 / 120	0	Opposition
1965	Menachem Begin	Part of Gahal		2nd	15 / 120	▼2	Opposition (1965–1967)
1965	Menachem Begin	Part of Gahal		2nd	15 / 120	▼2	Coalition (1967–1969)
1969	Menachem Begin	Part of Gahal		2nd	15 / 120	0	Coalition (1969–1970)
1969	Menachem Begin	Part of Gahal		2nd	15 / 120	0	Opposition (1970–1974)
1973	Menachem Begin	Part of Likud		2nd	18 / 120	▲3	Opposition
1977	Menachem Begin	Part of Likud		1st	20 / 120	▲2	Coalition
1981	Menachem Begin	Part of Likud		1st	25 / 120	▲5	Coalition
1984	Yitzhak Shamir	Part of Likud		2nd	27 / 120	▲2	Coalition

== Legacy ==
In 1998, Benny Begin (son of Menachem Begin), Michael Kleiner, and David Re'em broke away from Likud in protest at Benjamin Netanyahu's agreement to the Wye River Memorandum and the Hebron Agreement, which had ceded land to the Palestinians. They named their new party Herut – The National Movement, and tried to claim it as the successor to the original party. However, in reality, it was a new and separate party. Today, the party ideology continues through the Magshimey Herut movement.
