= Shmuel Merlin =

Irgun member and Israeli politician

- שמואל מרלין
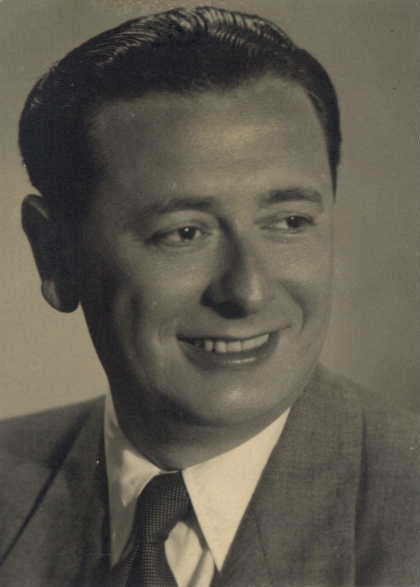

Faction represented in the Knesset
- 1949–1951: Herut

Personal details
- Born: 1910 Kishinev, Russian Empire
- Died: 4 October 1994 (aged 83–84)

Shmuel Merlin (Hebrew: שמואל מרלין; 1910 – 4 October 1994) was a Revisionist Zionist activist, Irgun member and Israeli politician.

== Biography ==
Merlin was born in Kishinev in the Russian Empire (now Moldova), where he attended high school and joined the Betar movement. From 1933 to 1938, he was Chief Secretary of the Executive of the World Union of Revisionist Zionists. In 1938, he became editor of the Yiddish language Irgun publication in Warsaw, Di Tat. He was interviewed extensively in the feature documentary film "Who Shall Live and Who Shall Die?" (1982).

At the break of World War II he made his way to Paris, where he studied social sciences and history at the University of Paris, and from there to the United States, where he was active in creating committees of support for the Irgun and edited the English language weekly Answer for the “Hebrew Committee for the Liberation of the Nation”. He also served as an emissary for the organization in Europe in 1948.

In 1948, he immigrated to Israel on board the Altalena. He was one of the founders of the Herut Movement, its General Secretary and chief editor of the Herut newspaper. He was elected to the first Knesset for Herut and was a member of the Internal Affairs Committee. Later, he became a University lecturer in the United States on Middle East issues. He died in 1994.
