= OpenEvidence =

Medical information platform

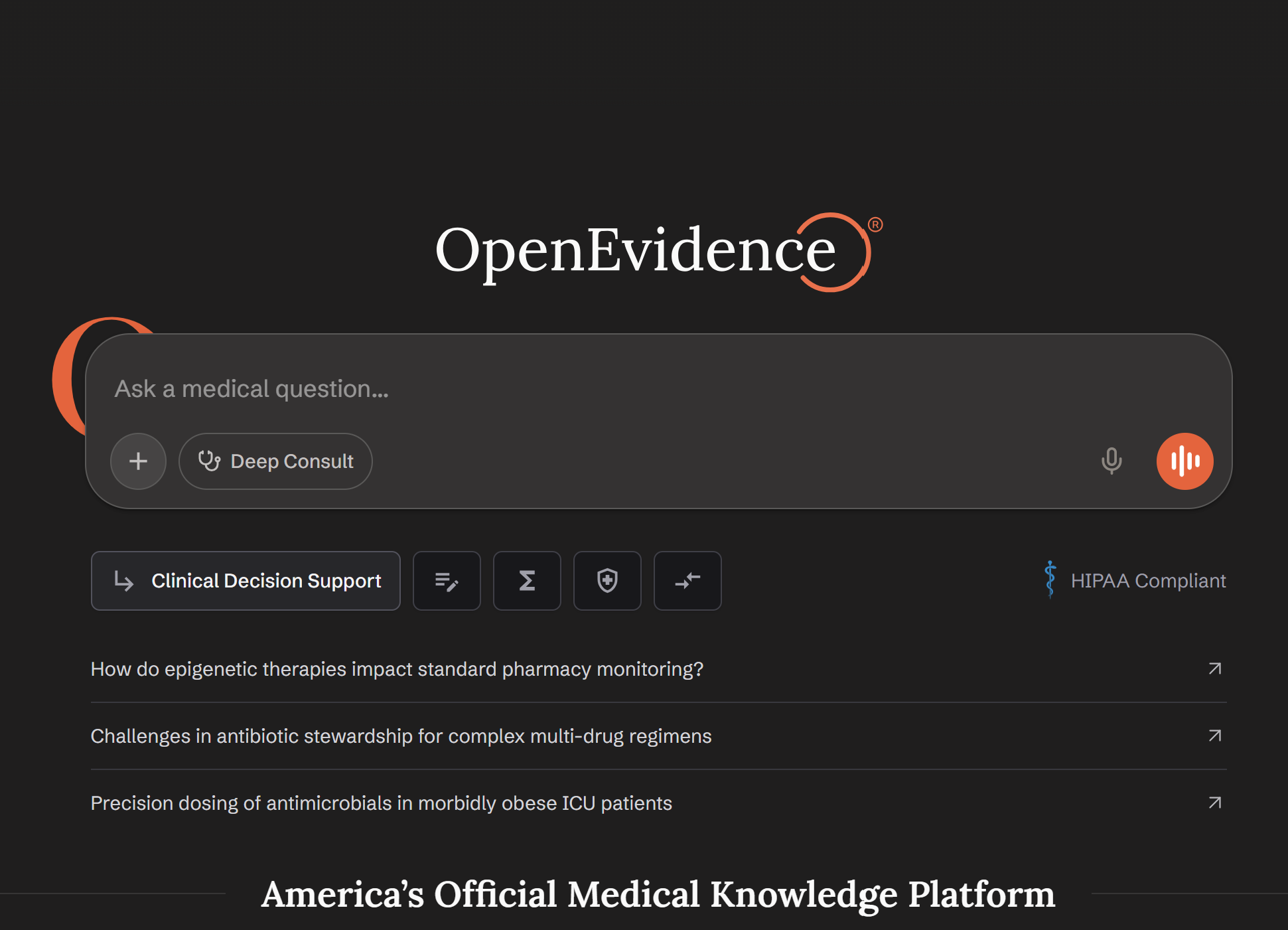
- Type: Private
- Industry: Artificial intelligence Healthcare technology
- Founded: 2022
- Founders: Daniel Nadler, Zachary Ziegler
- Headquarters: Miami, Florida, United States
- Area served: United States
- Key people: Daniel Nadler (Co-founder & CEO); Zachary Ziegler (Co-founder)
- Total equity: $15 billion (2026)
- Website: www.openevidence.com

OpenEvidence is an American artificial intelligence company that develops a clinical decision support system large language model platform of the same name. The company was founded in 2022 by entrepreneur Daniel Nadler and is headquartered in Miami, Florida. As of September 2026, the company is valued at $15 billion.

== History ==
OpenEvidence was founded in 2022 by Daniel Nadler. Nadler launched the company with co-founder Zack Ziegler, a machine learning researcher from Harvard, to address the challenge physicians face in keeping up with the growing volume of medical literature.

In 2023, OpenEvidence reported that its artificial intelligence model achieved a 90% score on the United States Medical Licensing Examination (USMLE). During the same year, the company participated in the Mayo Clinic health-technology accelerator. In 2025, the company stated that the model had achieved a 100% score on the USMLE.

In February 2025, OpenEvidence raised $75 million in a Series A round led by Sequoia Capital, valuing the company at $1 billion. In July 2025, the company secured $210 million in funding from a round led by GV and Kleiner Perkins, with participation from Coatue, Conviction, and Thrive Capital. This round valued the company at $3.5 billion.

On October 20, 2025, the company announced a $200 million Series C funding round, valuing the company at US$6 billion. In January 2026, OpenEvidence raised $250 million in a Series D funding round at a $12 billion valuation. By February 2026, OpenEvidence had raised approximately $700 million in total funding from investors including GV, Nvidia, Sequoia, Blackstone, Thrive Capital, Kleiner Perkins, Craft Ventures, and Mayo Clinic. In September 2026, it raised $250 million in funding at a $15 billion valuation.

== Partnerships ==
As of 2026, OpenEvidence has content licensing partnerships with several medical organizations and journals, including American Medical Association, National Comprehensive Cancer Network, American Academy of Family Physicians, American College of Emergency Physicians, New England Journal of Medicine, Journal of the American Medical Association, JAMA Network, JAMA Oncology, and JAMA Neurology.

In May 2026, OpenEvidence partnered with Cedars-Sinai to integrate its decision support platform into the hospital's electronic health record infrastructure.

== Product ==
OpenEvidence develops a large language model that analyzes peer-reviewed medical literature from clinical journals. The company generates revenue from advertising and is available at no cost to verified physicians.

In July 2025, the company reported 430,000 registered physicians in the United States, about 40% of American physicians, had signed up for OpenEvidence. In the same month, OpenEvidence introduced a feature called DeepConsult, described as employing reasoning models to synthesize findings across multiple studies.

In May 2026, the company introduced Voice Mode, a voice-based interface for its platform.

== See also ==
- Generative AI
- List of freeware health software
