= Nadler =

Nadler is a German surname meaning "wire drawer". Notable people with the surname include:

- Allan L. Nadler (born 1954), American rabbi and professor
- Daniel Nadler, Canadian-born poet and entrepreneur
- David A. Nadler (1948–2015), American organizational theorist
- David Nadler (mathematician) (born 1973), American mathematician
- Henrik Nádler (1901–1944), Hungarian footballer
- Jeffrey P. Nadler (born 1950), American infectious diseases physician and HIV/AIDS expert
- Jerry Nadler (born 1947), American politician
- Jo-Anne Nadler, British journalist, author and politician
- Judith Nadler, Romanian-American librarian
- Marissa Nadler (born 1981), American musician
- Mark Nadler, American cabaret performer, actor and pianist
- Patricia Nadler (born 1969), Swiss athlete and development official
- Shulamit Nadler (1923–2016), Israeli architect
- Steven Nadler (born 1958), American philosopher
- Tilo Nadler (born 1941), German primatologist

Fictional figures

- Bernard Nadler, character from the ABC television series Lost, husband of Rose
- Karen Nadler, character from the TNT television series Falling Skies
- Rose Nadler, character from the ABC television series Lost, wife of Bernard
