= Howard Bauchner =

American academic and editor

Howard C. Bauchner
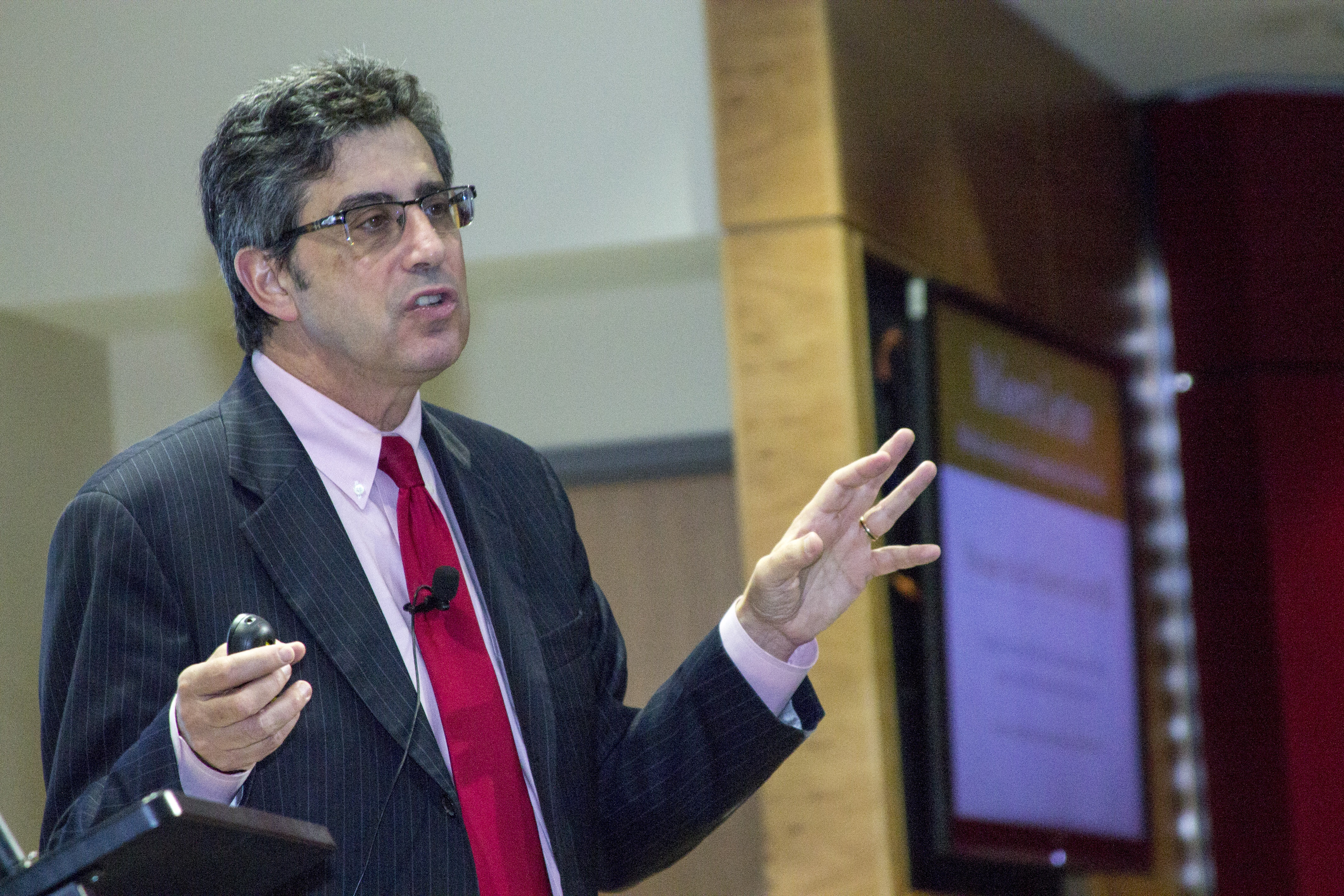
- Bauchner in 2015
- Education: University of California, Berkeley (BA); Boston University (MD)
- Scientific career
- Fields: Pediatrics and Community Health
- Institutions: Boston University School of Medicine, JAMA

Howard C. Bauchner, vice chairman of pediatrics at the Boston University School of Medicine, was the editor-in-chief of the Journal of the American Medical Association (JAMA) from July 1, 2011, until June 30, 2021. During his time with JAMA he created the JAMA Network family of specialty journals, launched four new journals (JAMA Oncology, JAMA Cardiology, JAMA Network Open, JAMA Health Forum), created many new article types, established a relationship with the United States Preventive Services Task Force, and expanded the journal's digital presence through website redesign, search engine optimization of journal websites, and expanded social media and multimedia activity. He stepped down from the editor-in-chief position in response to public outcry following a JAMA Network podcast discussing structural racism where the podcast host and Deputy Editor at JAMA questioned its existence.

From 2003 to 2011, he served as editor-in-chief of Archives of Disease in Childhood.
