= United States Health Care Reform: Progress to Date and Next Steps =

2016 review article by Barack Obama

"United States Health Care Reform: Progress to Date and Next Steps" is a review article by then-President of the United States Barack Obama in which he reviews the effects of the Affordable Care Act (ACA), a major health care law he signed in 2010, and recommends health care policy changes that he thinks would build on its successes. The article was published in the Journal of the American Medical Association (JAMA) as a "special communication" online on July 11, 2016, and in print on August 2, 2016. With the article's publication, Obama became the first sitting U.S. president to publish an article in a peer-reviewed academic journal. The article was named the most popular paper published in an academic journal in 2016 by Altmetric, which gave it a score of 8,063, the highest such score ever recorded.

== Background ==
White House deputy chief of staff for implementation Kristie Canegallo told NPR that the idea for Obama to write the article originated when he requested a "comprehensive review" of the Affordable Care Act from his staff in late 2015. Canegallo also said that after he received this review, he decided he wanted to share its findings publicly, and that the purpose of Obama's article was to inform future policy makers.

== Peer review ==
According to Bloomberg News, the article was not peer-reviewed, but did undergo multiple rounds of editing and fact-checking. A spokesman for JAMA said that "The article by President Obama was treated in the same fashion as other Special Communication articles, including undergoing rigorous internal review, two revisions of the manuscript, and subsequent modifications during the editing process as the revised manuscript was reviewed again by the Editor-in-Chief and Executive Editor". The editor-in-chief of JAMA, Howard Bauchner, said that the article underwent two months of fact-checking and revisions before being published.

== Accompanying editorials ==
Four editorials were also published alongside the article critiquing its conclusions. One editorial was written by Peter Orszag, the former director of the Office of Management and Budget earlier in the Obama administration, and a major architect of the ACA. Orszag argued that the ACA had generally succeeded in its objectives, in line with what Obama argued in his article, while the other three editorials (one by Stuart Butler, one by Jonathan Skinner and Amitabh Chandra, and one by Howard Bauchner) were more critical of Obama's conclusions. For example, the editorial by Skinner and Chandra criticized Obama's claim that the ACA was limiting the growth of health care spending, and Butler's editorial argued that the savings produced by the ACA may not have benefited consumers.

== Conclusions regarding the Affordable Care Act ==
In the article, Obama reviews the effects of his signature health care reform law, the Patient Protection and Affordable Care Act, widely known as "Obamacare". He concludes that since the law took effect, 20 million more Americans have gained health insurance under it, and the uninsurance rate has dropped to 9.1% (as of 2015). He also acknowledges that more work remains to be done to improve America's health care system, noting that many Americans still cannot afford many of their medical treatments and visits, or have no health insurance at all.

== Recommendations ==
In the article, Obama recommends that after he leaves office, the next president should introduce a "public option" for health insurance in parts of the United States where there are few insurers in the marketplace. He also calls on his successor to try to reduce prices of prescription drugs.
