= Clyde Yancy =

American cardiologist

Clyde Warren Yancy
- Born: January 2, 1958 (age 68)
- Education: Southern University; Tulane University Medical School
- Scientific career
- Workplaces: Parkland Memorial Hospital; Southwestern Medical Center; Northwestern University Feinberg School of Medicine

Clyde Warren Yancy (born January 2, 1958) is an American cardiologist and the Magerstadt Professor at Northwestern University Feinberg School of Medicine. He has previously served as the Past President of the American Heart Association. His research considers heart failure, heart transplantation and ways to prevent heart failure. He is Vice Dean of Health Equity.

== Early life and education ==
Yancy was born in Baton Rouge, Louisiana, to Hilda Jones and Clyde Yancy Senior. When he was a child, his parents moved to Scotlandville, where his mother worked as a teacher. Yancy joined the Eagle Scouts as a teenager and played the saxophone in a marching band. Throughout his time at high school, Yancy attended the laboratory classes at Southern University. He eventually attended that same university for his bachelor's degree, where he graduated with a 4.0 GPA. He awarded early acceptance at the Tulane University School of Medicine, where he was a member of Alpha Omega Alpha. He graduated with his medical degree in 1982. Yancy completed his medical residency and internship at the Parkland Memorial Hospital in Texas. In 1989 Yancy moved to the University of Texas Southwestern Medical Center as a Fellow in Cardiology in 1989.

== Research and career ==
In 1989 Yancy joined the faculty at the University of Texas Southwestern Medical Center, where he eventually became the Carl H. Westcott Distinguished Chair in Medical Research. Yancy first became aware of health disparities during the mid-nineties, when he realised that African American patients presented with more advanced disease at younger ages. Yancy has extensively studied disparities in cardiovascular disease. In 2006 Yancy moved to the Baylor University Medical Center, where he was made the medical director of the Baylor Heart and Vascular Institute. Yancy was appointed Magerstadt Professor at Northwestern University Feinberg School of Medicine in 2011.

During the COVID-19 pandemic Yancy investigated the reasons that Black and African-American people were more likely to suffer from severe forms of coronavirus disease. He believes that the pandemic should drive society to address healthcare disparities. In an event with the American College of Cardiology, Yancy remarked, “My greatest risk of death is no longer COVID-19. It is the color of my skin”. He does not believe that health disparities in the United States will be entirely solved by the creation of new policies, but by asking the question, “How can we interject compassion, civility and concern for all communities and not allow some communities to remain marginalized?”. He worked with Robert Bonow to better understand the impact of coronavirus disease on people with cardiovascular conditions. He is particularly concerned that people who have recovered from coronavirus disease appear to suffer from heart abnormalities.

== Academic service ==
Yancy works to improve the representation of Black people working in medicine.

== Awards and honours ==
- 2001 Association of Black Cardiologists Daniel Savage Award for Scientific Achievement
- 2003 American Heart Association Physician of the Year
- 2015, 2016, 2017, 2018, 2019 Thomson Reuters Highly Cited Researcher, Top 1% of all Researchers in the Field
- 2009 Elected President of the American Heart Association
- 2016 Elected to the National Academy of Medicine
- 2019 Tulane University School of Medicine Outstanding Alumnus Award
- 2020 Elected to the Association of American Physicians

== Select papers ==
- Hunt, Sharon Ann; Abraham, William T; Chin, Marshall H; Feldman, Arthur M; Francis, Gary S; Ganiats, Theodore G; Jessup, Mariell; Konstam, Marvin A; Mancini, Donna M; Michl, Keith; Yancy, Clyde W. (2009). "2009 Focused Update Incorporated Into the ACC/AHA 2005 Guidelines for the Diagnosis and Management of Heart Failure in Adults: A Report of the American College of Cardiology Foundation/American Heart Association Task Force on Practice Guidelines Developed in Collaboration With the International Society for Heart and Lung Transplantation". Journal of the American College of Cardiology. 53 (15): e1–e90. doi:10.1016/j.jacc.2008.11.013. ISSN 0735-1097. OCLC 4932805427. PMID 19358937.
- January, Craig T; Wann, L. Samuel; Alpert, Joseph S; Calkins, Hugh; Cigarroa, Joaquin E; Cleveland, Joseph C; Conti, Jamie B; Ellinor, Patrick T; Ezekowitz, Michael D; Field, Michael E; Yancy, Clyde W. (2014). "2014 AHA/ACC/HRS Guideline for the Management of Patients With Atrial Fibrillation". Journal of the American College of Cardiology. 64 (21): e1–e76. doi:10.1016/j.jacc.2014.03.022. ISSN 0735-1097. OCLC 5575647810. PMID 24685669.
- Yancy C.W; Jessup M; Bozkurt B; Butler J; Drazner M.H; Fonarow G.C; Horwich T; Januzzi J.L; Kasper E.K; Levy W.C; Masoudi F.A (2013). "2013 ACCF/AHA guideline for the management of heart failure: A report of the American college of cardiology foundation/american heart association task force on practice guidelines". Journal of the American College of Cardiology. 62 (16): e147–e239. doi:10.1016/j.jacc.2013.05.019. ISSN 0735-1097. OCLC 5164937317. PMID 23747642.
- Yancy, Clyde W; Young, James B (2008). Therapeutic strategies in heart failure. Oxford: Clinical Publishing. ISBN 978-1-84692-548-1. OCLC 945675825.

== Personal life ==
Yancy has two daughters.
