= Mary L. Disis =

American physician

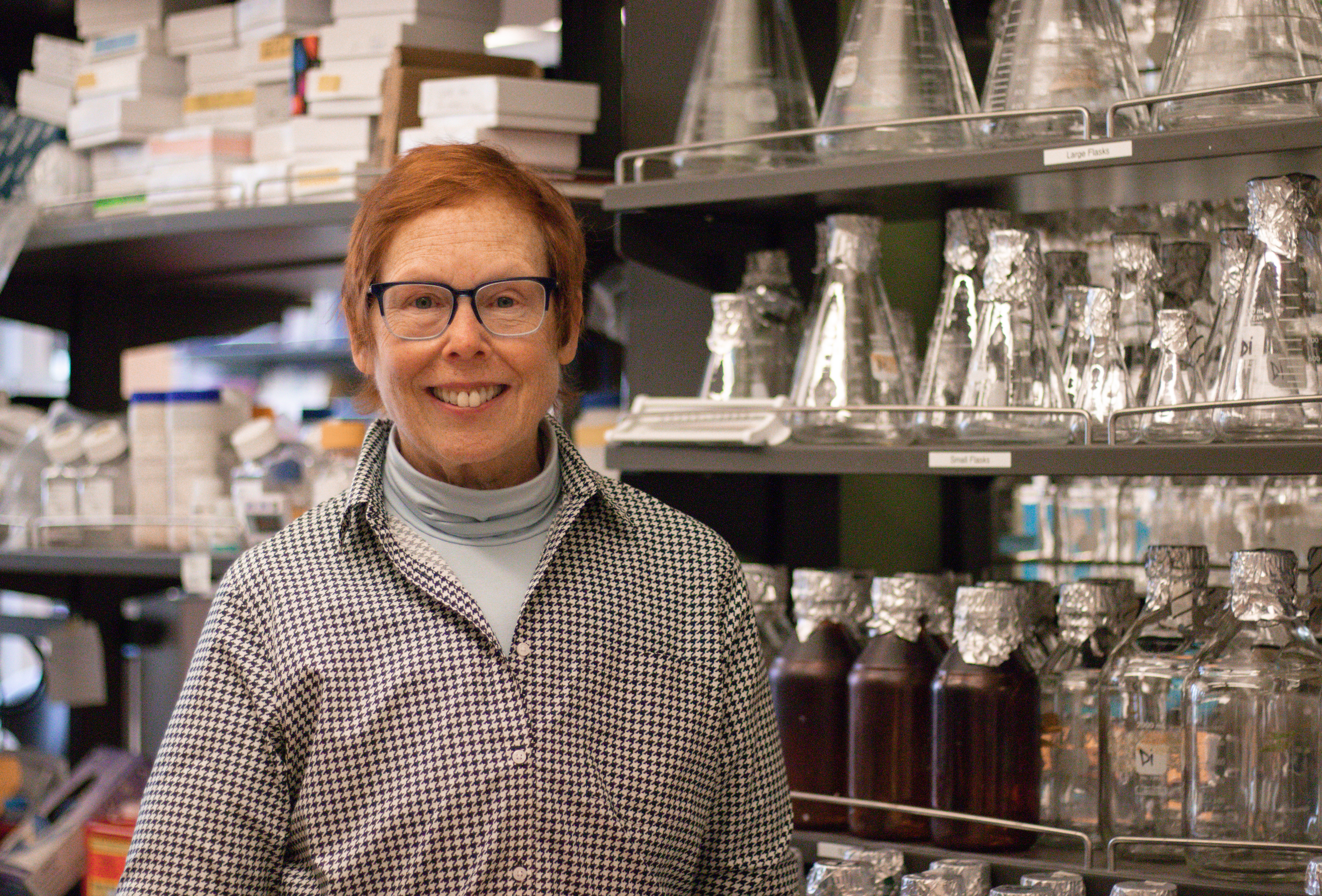
Disis at the Cancer Vaccine Institute laboratory at the University of Washington

Mary "Nora" L. Disis is an American physician-oncologist whose research focuses on cancer immunotherapy and cancer vaccines, particularly breast and ovarian cancer. She is the editor-in-chief of JAMA Oncology and director of the Cancer Vaccine Institute at the University of Washington.

She was part of the scientific team who discovered that the HER2/neu molecule is a tumor-specific marker, or antigen.

== Education ==
Disis attended Creighton University, graduating with chemistry and English degrees. She received her medical degree from the University of Nebraska–Lincoln and completed her residency at the University of Illinois College of Medicine. She received a fellowship at the University of Washington Division of Medical Oncology in 1993. She has board certifications in Internal Medicine (1989) and Medical Oncology (1997).

== Biography ==
Mary "Nora" Disis received her medical degree from the University of Nebraska–Lincoln and completed her residency at the University of Illinois College of Medicine. She received a fellowship at the University of Washington Division of Medical Oncology in 1993. She has board certifications in Internal Medicine (1989) and Medical Oncology (1997).

Disis became interested in medicine and research in high school, becoming "involved in lab-based research projects in college and medical school." She is a member of Sigma Xi, Alpha Omega Alpha, and a member of the Association of American Physicians. She was elected as a member of the American Society for Clinical Investigation in 2004. She is a Fellow of the American Society of Clinical Oncology and a member of the ASCO's Research Pipeline Workgroup.

She has discussed gender inequity in the science field. She commented on the gender gap and lack of leadership positions for women. In an interview with CoMotion, she discussed mentorship, innovation, and opportunities within biomedical research, noting that she was the only female oncology fellow in her class.

As an early investigator, her research helped establish HER2/neu as a tumor antigen.

== Career ==
Disis is the founder and director of the UW Cancer Vaccine Institute (formerly Tumor Vaccine Group), a member of Fred Hutchinson Cancer Center, editor-in-chief of JAMA Oncology, a deputy editor for JAMA and a past associate dean at the University of Washington School of Medicine. She holds the title of the Helen B. Slonaker Endowed Professorship for Cancer Research, professor of Medicine and Oncology, and adjunct professor of Obstetrics & Gynecology and Pathology. Her work has included the development of cancer immunotherapies, vaccines, and diagnostic technologies, and she has contributed to multiple patents related to cancer immunotherapy. She cofounded the biotechnology company EpiThany, which focuses on cancer vaccine technologies.

She founded the Institute of Translational Health Sciences (ITHS) and served as Principal Investigator from 2007 through 2024.

Disis served as a Komen Scholar for Susan G. Komen from 2012 to 2021, where she participated as a reviewer in Komen's peer review process.

In 2015, she became the founding editor-in-chief of JAMA Oncology, a peer-reviewed medical journal published by the American Medical Association. Under Disis' leadership, the journal launched its first issue in 2015 and became one of the American Medical Association's specialty journals. She is a deputy editor for JAMA. She has previously worked as an editor at the Journal of Clinical Oncology.

On July 1, 2015, she received the American Cancer Society Clinical Research Professorship. As an ACS Professor, she served as a spokesperson for the Society. Her research focused on vaccines to prevent colon cancer by identifying proteins that are overexpressed in early stages of the disease. In 2020, her professorship was renewed for another five years. The renewal included a lifelong professorship designation.

She is an Athena Distinguished Professor of Breast Cancer Research and has been a Breast Cancer Research Foundation investigator since 2016. In 2016, she was a Chair of the ASCO-SITC Clinical Immuno-Oncology Symposium Program Committee.

Disis has discussed developments in cancer immunotherapy and vaccine-based approaches to treatment. In 2023, CGTLive also reported on her comments regarding investigational immunotherapy approaches, including CAR T-cell therapies being studied for solid tumors.

In 2025, she was among investigators receiving funding support for research on ovarian cancer vaccines through a collaboration between the Rivkin Center and the Andy Hill CARE Fund.

She has been a reviewer for the NIH New Innovator Award, Ovarian Cancer Action, Helene Harris Memorial Trust, Department of Defense Ovarian Cancer Research Program, Canadian Breast Cancer Research Initiative, Canadian Institute of Cancer Research, Susan G. Komen Breast Cancer Foundation, State of California Breast Cancer Research Program, and American Federation for Aging Research.

== Research ==
Disis' research focuses on immune-based therapies for cancers, particularly breast and ovarian cancer. Her research interest is specifically focused on the development of vaccines for the treatment and prevention of cancer.

=== HER-2/neu ===
Disis has conducted research on human epidermal growth factor receptor 2 (HER2, also known as ERBB2), a protein that is overexpressed in subsets of breast and ovarian cancers. Her research has investigated HER2/neu as a tumor antigen and the use of HER2-specific immune responses in cancer treatment. In a 2002 study of patients with HER2/neu-overexpressing breast, ovarian, or non-small-cell lung cancer, Disis and colleagues found that 92% of patients developed T-cell responses the vaccine peptides, while 68% developed responses to a broader HER2/neu protein domain. The researchers also observed epitope spreading.

Disis and her collaborators have investigated vaccines targeting HER2, including peptide-based vaccines and vaccines containing the intracellular domain of the HER2 protein. Clinical studies examined the safety of these approaches and whether these vaccines could induce HER2-specific immune responses in patients with cancer. The vaccine was well-tolerated, and 89% of the patients developed HER2/neu-specific T-cell responses, while 82% developed HER2/neu-specific antibody responses.

Her research has also explored combining HER2 vaccination with adoptive T-cell therapy, in which immune cells are collected from a patient, expanded, and returned to the patient. A phase I/II clinical study evaluated HER2/neu vaccine-primed autologous T-cell infusions in patients with advanced HER2-expressing cancers.

In 2011, Newsweek profiled Disis's research on an experimental HER2/neu vaccine for metastatic breast cancer, describing the vaccine as an approach intended to stimulate T-cell responses against HER2/neu antigens expressed by cancer cells.

In a phase I clinical trial published in 2023, she and her colleagues evaluated a plasmid DNA vaccine encoding the intracellular domain of ERBB2 in patients with advanced HER2-positive breast cancer. The study primarily assessed the vaccine's safety and ability to induce immune responses.

=== Selected publications ===
- Disis, Mary L. (Nora); Guthrie, Katherine A; Liu, Ying (2022-11-03). "Safety and Outcomes of a Plasmid DNA Vaccine Encoding the ERBB2 Intracellular Domain in Patients With Advanced-Stage ERBB2-Positive Breast Cancer". JAMA Oncology. 9 (1). doi:10.1001/jamaoncol.2022.5143. PMC 9634596.
- Stanton, Sasha E.; Cecil, Denise L.; Bailey, Howard H.; et al. (2026-05-04). "Safety and immunogenicity of a tri-antigen vaccine targeting IGFBP-2, HER2, and IGF-IR in participants with non-metastatic breast cancer". Journal for ImmunoTherapy of Cancer. 14 (5) e014314. doi:10.1136/jitc-2025-014314.

== Awards and honors ==
- Merrill Egorin Award for Mentoring, ASCO-AACR Clinical Trials Workshop
- 1981 – Spirit of Creighton Award from Creighton University
- 2015 – American Cancer Society Clinical Research Professor Award
- 2022 – Science Advancement and Leadership Award from the Seattle Chapter of the Association for Women in Science
- 2023 – Top 23 Women in Academic Entrepeneurship
- 2024 – Lifetime Achievement Award from the Puget Sound Business Journal
- 2024 – UW Medicine Inventor of the Year
- 2024 – ACS Award for Creative Invention from the American Chemical Society
- 2024 – Wayne Kuni Award for Innovation in Cancer Research
- 2025 – Seahawks Delta Community Captain
- 2025 – Champion of SITC Award from the Society of Immunotherapy of Cancer
- 2025 – Brava! Award from the Women's University Club
