= Medscape =

Web resource for healthcare professionals

- Website type: Health information
- Available in: English, German, Spanish, French, Portuguese
- Owner: Internet Brands
- Website: www.medscape.com
- Registration: Required
- Launched: May 22, 1995; 31 years ago

Medscape is a website providing access to medical information for clinicians and medical scientists; the organization also provides continuing education for physicians and other health professionals. It references medical journal articles, Continuing Medical Education (CME), a version of the National Library of Medicine's MEDLINE database, medical news, and drug information (Medscape Drug Reference, or MDR). At one time Medscape published seven electronic peer reviewed journals.

== History ==
Medscape launched May 22, 1995, by SCP Communications, Inc. under the direction of its CEO Peter Frishauf. The first editor of Medscape was a P.A. named Stephen Smith. In 1999, George D. Lundberg became the editor-in-chief of Medscape. For seventeen years before joining Medscape he served as editor of the Journal of the American Medical Association.

In September 1999, Medscape, Inc. went public and began trading on NASDAQ under the symbol MSCP. In 2000, Medscape merged with MedicaLogic, Inc., another public company. MedicaLogic filed for bankruptcy within 18 months and sold Medscape to WebMD in December 2001. In 2008, Lundberg was terminated by WebMD. The following year the Medscape Journal of Medicine ceased publishing. In January 2013, Eric Topol was named editor-in-chief of Medscape. The same year, Lundberg returned to Medscape as editor-at-large.

In 2009, WebMD released an iOS application of Medscape, followed by an Android version two years later. In 2015, WebMD launched Medscape CME & Education on iOS. In 2021, Medscape launched Medscape UK to expand their business in United Kingdom.

In November 2025, Medscape launched Medscape AI, a generative artificial intelligence tool designed for clinicians. The platform integrates Medscape’s proprietary content with peer-reviewed literature from more than 400 medical journals, as well as real-time medical news. According to Medscape, the tool is designed to exclude unverified information from the open internet and provides cited AI responses with regular human editorial oversight, providing transparent and reliable responses. Medscape AI was developed with input from clinicians and is available to registered Medscape users at no cost.

== Criticisms ==
In 2016 a survey of doctors found WebMD and its sister company Medscape to have incomplete medical information lacking depth and also numerous cases of misinformation on their sites. A study of Medscape and WebMD also found both services to lack neutrality and exhibiting bias potentially based on very high payments (compared to their industry competitors) from the pharmaceutical industry.

In April 2024, Medscape was strongly criticized for running educational content funded by tobacco transnational Philip Morris International (PMI), with critics saying that the tobacco industry should abstain from any involvement in medical education. In response, Medscape said the content was fully compliant with medical education industry accreditation standards, but said it would not accept funding from any tobacco industry-affiliated organization in the future. It also withdrew from the multimillion dollar deal with PMI, which included plans to deliver 13 programs, called the "PMI Curriculum", as well as podcasts and a TV-like series.
