= Jerusalem Theatre =

Centre for performing arts in Jerusalem, Israel

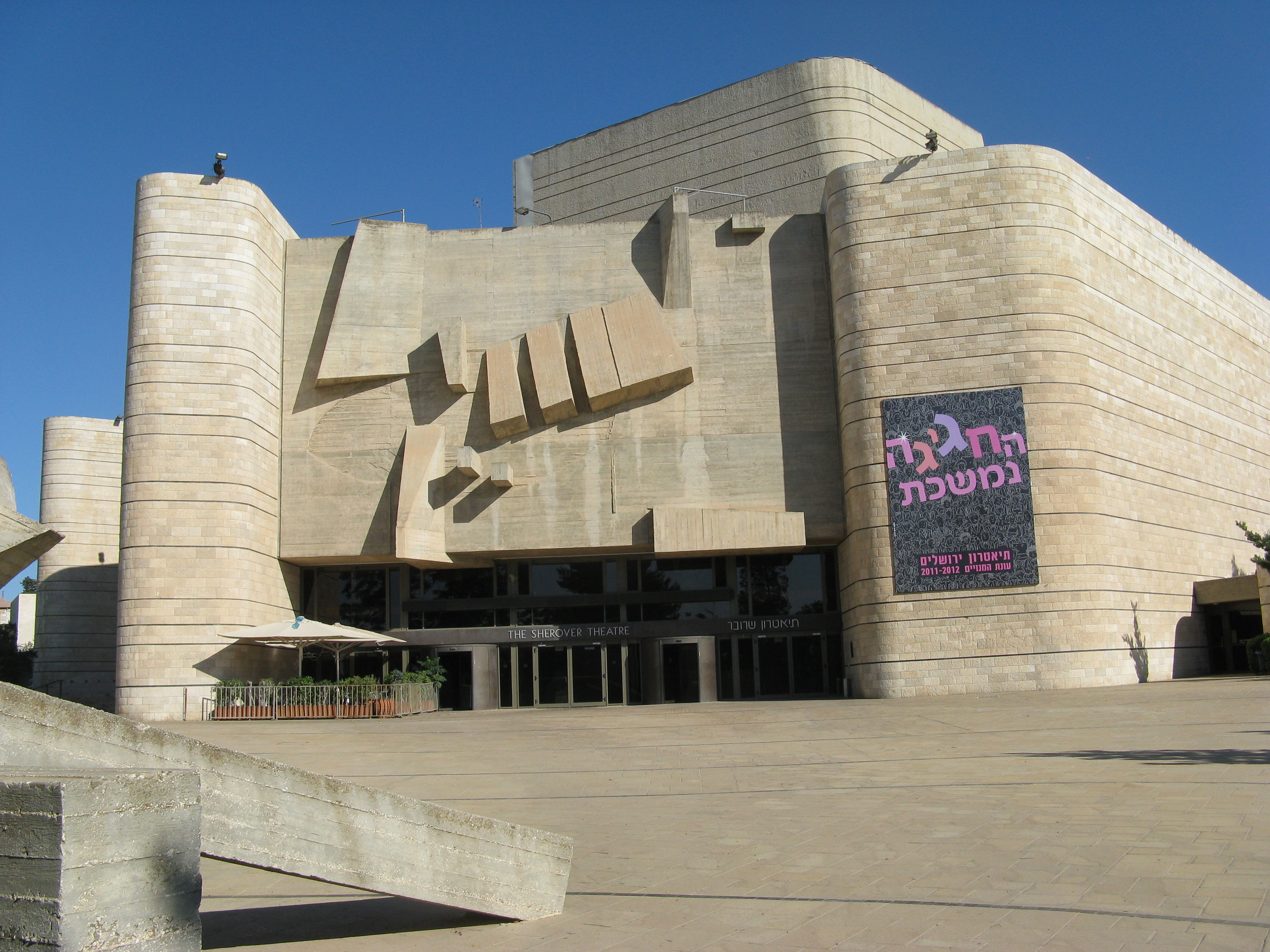
- Interactive map of Jerusalem Theatre
- Location: Jerusalem, Israel
- Coordinates: 31°46′08″N 35°12′56″E

Website
- Official website

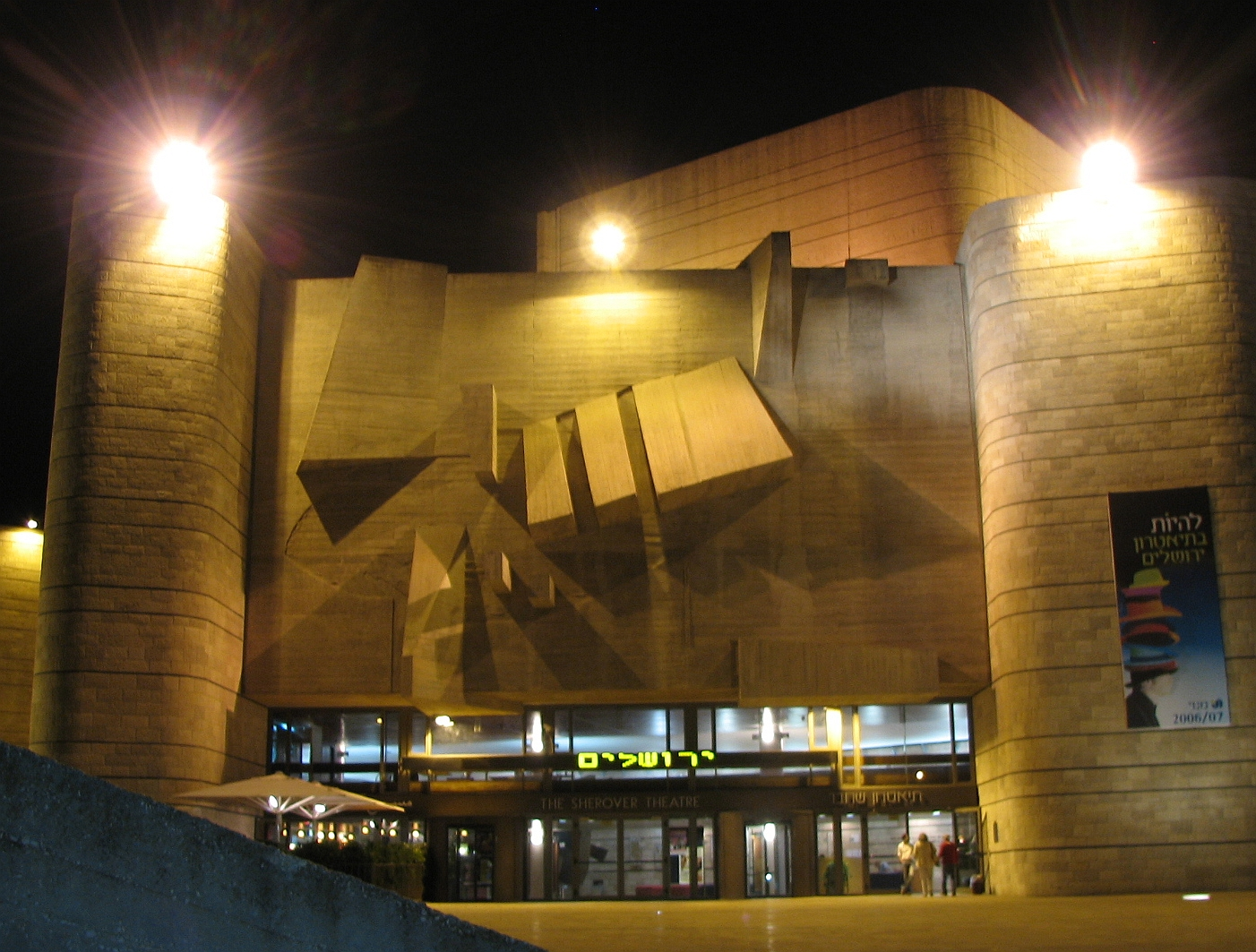
Jerusalem Theatre at night.

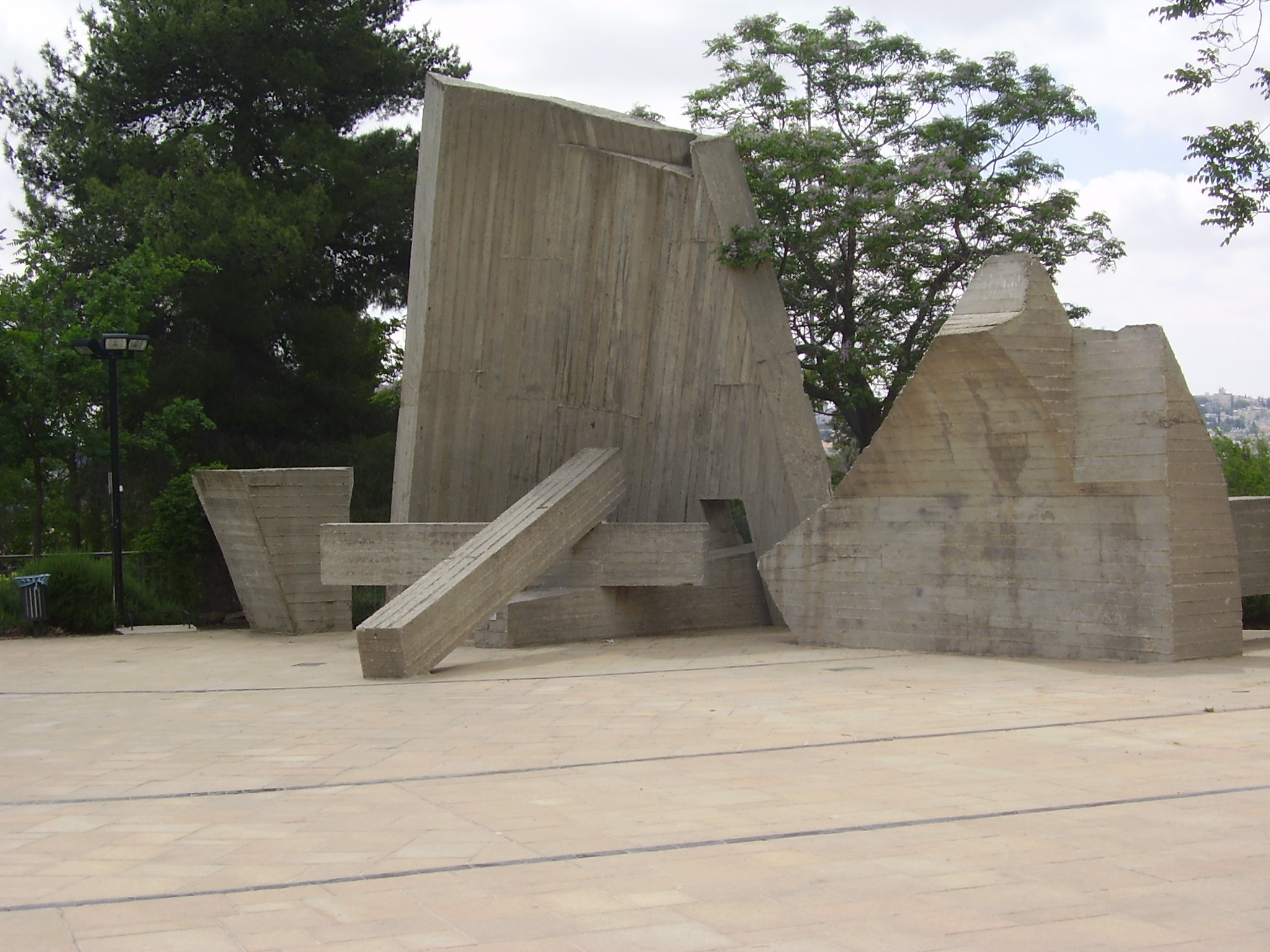
The sculpture "Genesis" by Yehiel Shemi, permanently displayed in front of the theatre

The Jerusalem Theatre (Hebrew: תיאטרון ירושלים, a.k.a. The Jerusalem Centre for the Performing Arts) is a centre for the performing arts in Jerusalem. The theatre opened in 1971. The complex consists of the Sherover Theatre, which seats 950, the Henry Crown Symphony Hall (home of the Jerusalem Symphony Orchestra) with 750 seats, the Rebecca Crown Auditorium, with 450 seats, and the Little Theatre with 110 seats. Changing art exhibits are held in the main foyer and other spaces in the building, and a restaurant and bookshop operate on the ground floor.

== History ==
In 1958, the Jerusalem Municipality, headed by Mordechai Ish Shalom, held a design competition for a municipal theatre on a plot of 11 dunams (2.8 acres), on the southern edge of the Talbiya neighborhood. Architects Michael Nadler, Shulamit Nadler and Shmuel Bixson won first prize. The municipality also received a large donation from the Jewish millionaire Miles Sherover, who made his fortune in Venezuela.

The cornerstone laying took place in October 1964. Despite plans to complete the building within two years, work progressed slowly due to disputes and budgetary problems. Critics claimed that the city had more pressing problems and predicted that the theatre would be a "white elephant." The building was dedicated in October 1971.

American millionaire Lester Crown, who had donated $9 million for a new sports stadium, in the Shuafat area that was never built, was persuaded by Jerusalem mayor Teddy Kollek to change the designation of the donation from sports to arts and culture. The money was used to build the Henry Crown Concert Hall, which seats 750, and the Rebecca Crown Auditorium, which seats 450. The planning and design of the new wing was carried out by the same architectural firm, so that the new wing, named for Crown's parents, was a natural continuation of the original design. In subsequent years, additional performance spaces were added to the complex, including a flexible Studio theatre space in 2009 and the Mikro Theatre in 2014, expanding the venue’s capacity and programming options.

=== Preservation recognition ===
In 2012, the Jerusalem Theatre complex, together with the nearby Presidential Residence and the Van Leer Institute, was officially listed for historical preservation by the Jerusalem Municipality, reflecting its architectural and cultural significance in the city’s modern built environment.

=== Renovation during COVID-19 ===
During the COVID-19 pandemic, the theatre underwent a major interior restoration project intended to return aspects of the public spaces to their original 1970s design. The renovation, reported to have cost approximately 24 million shekels, involved careful study of archival photographs and historical research to restore original interior details while also upgrading facilities for contemporary safety and accessibility standards.

== Architecture ==
The theatre combines sculptural elements of exposed concrete with traditional Jerusalem stone construction. It sits in a large public square that is used for outdoor concerts and other events.

== Tenants ==
- Mrs. World 1999
- Israel Prize

== See also ==
- International Convention Center (Jerusalem)
- Music of Israel
- Architecture of Israel
- Culture of Israel

== Books ==
- Zvi Elhyani, Michael Jacobson: Nadler, Nadler, Bixon & Gil, Architecture 1946-2010, 462 pages, Hebrew & English, Public school, 2016
