= JAMA Cardiology =

- Discipline: Cardiology
- Language: English
- Edited by: Robert O. Bonow

Publication details
- History: 2016–present
- Publisher: American Medical Association
- Frequency: Monthly
- Open access: Hybrid; delayed, after 12 months
- Impact factor: 24.0 (2022)

Standard abbreviations
- ISO 4: JAMA Cardiol.

Indexing
- ISSN: 2380-6591
- LCCN: 2015203484
- OCLC no.: 951184022

Links
- Journal homepage; Online access; Online archive

JAMA Cardiology is a monthly peer-reviewed medical journal covering cardiology. It was established in 2016 and is published by the American Medical Association. The editor-in-chief is Robert O. Bonow (Feinberg School of Medicine).

== Abstracting and indexing ==
The journal is abstracted and indexed in the Science Citation Index Expanded, Index Medicus/MEDLINE/PubMed, and Scopus. According to the Journal Citation Reports, the journal has a 2022 impact factor of 24.0.

== See also ==
- List of American Medical Association journals
- Journal of the American College of Cardiology
- Circulation
- European Heart Journal
