= JAMA Dermatology =

- Discipline: Dermatology
- Language: English
- Edited by: Kanade Shinkai

Publication details
- Former name(s): Archives of Dermatology
- History: 1920-present
- Publisher: American Medical Association
- Frequency: Monthly
- Impact factor: 11.816 (2021)

Standard abbreviations
- ISO 4: JAMA Dermatol.

Indexing
- CODEN: JDAEBX
- ISSN: 2168-6068 (print); 2168-6084 (web)
- LCCN: 2012200145
- OCLC no.: 909842397

Links
- Journal homepage; Online access; Online archive

JAMA Dermatology is a monthly peer-reviewed medical journal published by the American Medical Association. It covers the effectiveness of diagnosis and treatment in medical and surgical dermatology, pediatric and geriatric dermatology, and oncologic and aesthetic dermatologic surgery.

According to Journal Citation Reports, the journal has a 2021 impact factor of 11.816, ranking it 2nd out of 69 journals in the category "Dermatology". The editor-in-chief is Kanade Shinkai (University of California, San Francisco).

== Naming history ==
JAMA Internal Medicine – Historical name changes
Title	Year	ISSN
JAMA Dermatology	2013–present	2168-6068 (print); 2168-6084 (online)
Archives of Dermatology	1960–2012	0003-987X (print); 1538-3652 (online)
A.M.A. Archives of Dermatology	1955–1960	0096-5359 (print); 2375-6772 (online)
A.M.A. Archives of Dermatology and Syphilology	1950–1954	0096-5979 (print); 2375-6780 (online)
Archives of Dermatology and Syphilology	1920–1950	0096-6029 (print); 2376-3760 (online)

== Abstracting and indexing ==
The journal is abstracted and indexed in Index Medicus/MEDLINE/PubMed.

== See also ==
- List of American Medical Association journals
