= George D. Lundberg =

American pathologist and writer (born 1933)

George D. Lundberg (born March 21, 1933) is an American board-certified pathologist and writer.

Lundberg served as editor of the Journal of the American Medical Association (JAMA) for 17 years. In 1999, AMA Executive Vice President E. Ratcliffe Anderson Jr. fired Lundberg from this position after publishing a controversial article on how college students define oral sex. When asked about firing Lundberg, AMA EVP E. Ratcliffe Anderson Jr. said he was fired for "inappropriately and inexcusably interjecting JAMA into the middle of a debate that has nothing to do with science or medicine”. Lundberg's article coincided with President Clinton's impeachment trial during which the question of whether oral sex constitutes “sexual relations” was an issue. Executives from the American Medical Association stated that the article had nothing to do with medicine and it jeopardized the high standard of the journal.

Lundberg from February 1999 to January 2009, was the editor of Medscape. He currently serves as an editor-at-large for the site.

== Career in Pathology ==
- Clinical Chemist and Pathologist Assistant Trainee, Druid City Hospital, 1953 and 1955.
- Resident in Anatomic and Clinical Pathology, Brooke General Hospital, 1958-1962, with certification in both by American Board of Pathology, 1962
- MS in Pathology, Baylor University, 1963
- US Army (2nd Lt to LTC 1956-1967) staff pathologist Letterman General Hospital, 1962-64; Chief Pathologist William Beamont General Hospital, 1964-67.
- Assoc Prof and Prof Pathology USC 1967-1977; Asst and Associate Director of Laboratories and Pathology, LAC-USC Medical Center, 1968-1977
- Professor and Chair, UC Davis 1977-1982.
- President, American Society for Clinical Pathology, 1990-1991.

== Career in Medical Editing ==
1974-1982: Member, Editorial Board, Journal of the American Medical Association (JAMA).

January 2, 1982-January 15, 1999: Editor in Chief, JAMA, and VP for Scientific Information AMA, with editorial responsibility for JAMA, 10 AMA Archives Journals, and American Medical News.

1999- 2009: Editor in Chief, Medscape, MedGenMed, and The Medscape Journal of Medicine.

2010-2018: Editor in Chief, CollabRx.

2010-2013: Editor at Large, MedPage Today.

2018-2021: Editor in Chief and Contributing Editor: Cancer Commons.

2016-2021: Editor in Chief, Curious Dr.George.

2013-2021: Editor at Large, Medscape.

== Practice-changing Innovations ==
- The Brain-to-Brain Loop Concept for Laboratory Testing 40 Years After Its Introduction Mario Plebani, MD, Michael Laposata, MD, PhD, George D. Lundberg, MD. American Journal of Clinical Pathology, Volume 136, Issue 6, December 2011. Pages 829–833. From this article came a revolution: the brain to brain loop in clinical laboratory testing.
- Critical Values. This revolutionary concept, developed from 1969 beginning with Critical Laboratory Values, itself original and eventually the worldwide standard of practice.
- Managing the Patient-focused Laboratory Paperback – January 1, 1975 by George D Lundberg (Author). At LAC/USC, the patient-focused committee invented the patient-focused laboratory, organizing a lab based on turnaround time for lab results, a revolutionary concept.
- Using the Clinical Laboratory in Medical Decision-Making, Rex B. Conn, MD, Emory University School of Medicine Atlanta. JAMA. 1984;252(7):951. doi:10.1001/jama.1984.03350070063028. Additional documentation of original creativity of importance during Dr. Lundberg's Pathology career.

== Editorial and Publishing Inventions of Lasting Value ==
In collaboration with many others, led:

- The transition of peer review from art toward science by initiating the (evolved into Quadrennial) International Congress on Peer Review in Biomedical Publication in 1986.
- The concept of dedicated Theme Issues for medical journals, beginning in August 1983 with the JAMA (became annual) Hiroshima issue dedicated to the prevention of Nuclear War.
- Other annual theme issues on Caring for the Un and Underinsured, Violence as a Public Health Issue, HIV-AIDS, and Medical Education.
- The Ethics of the Medical Internet
- Primary source, peer reviewed, exclusively electronic medical journals.
