= Shulamit Nadler =

Israeli modernist architect

- שולמית נדלר
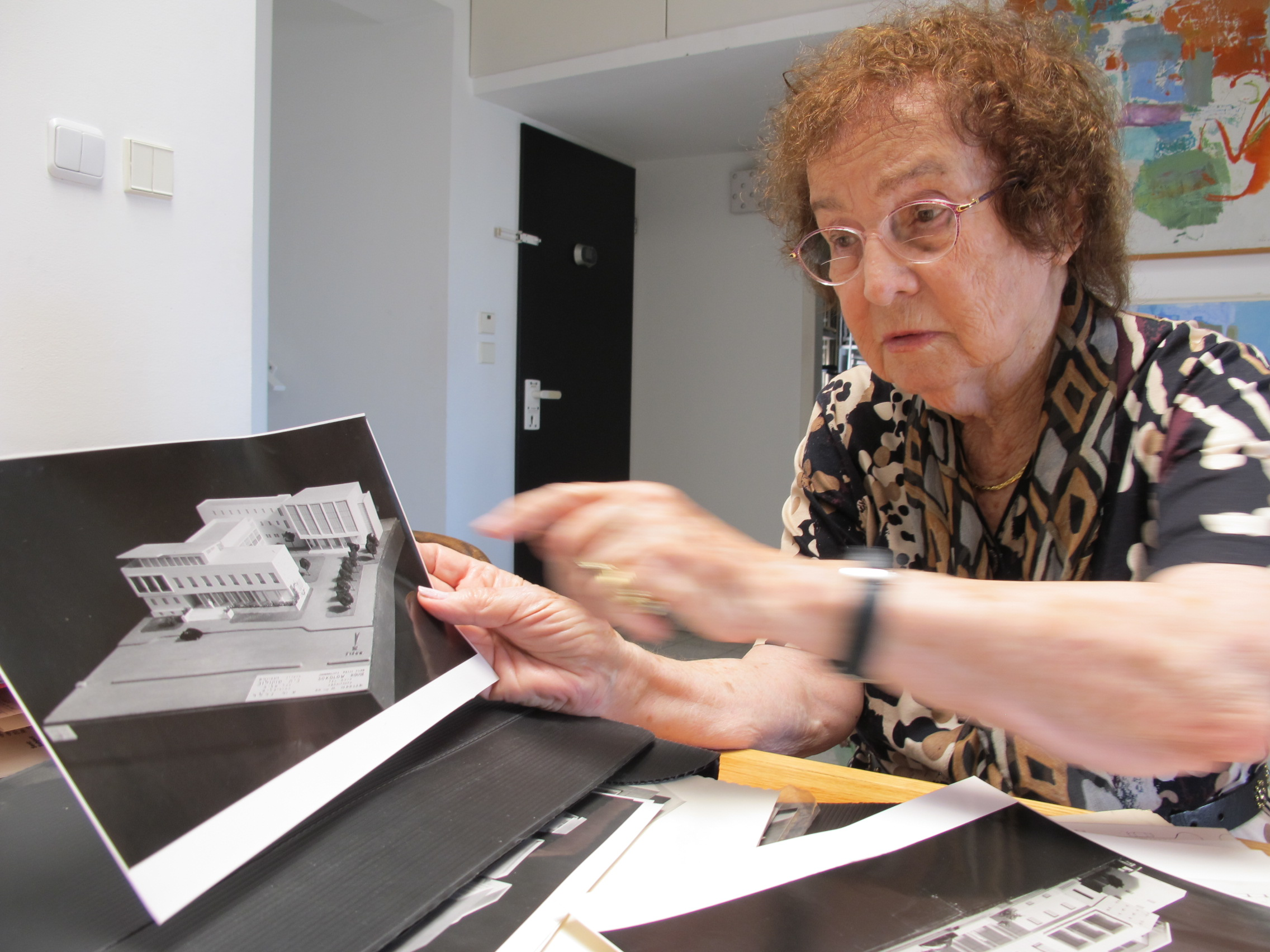
- Born: Shulamit Knibski; August 16, 1923
- Died: August 27, 2016 (aged 93)
- Parent: Yitzhak Kanev

Shulamit Nadler (Hebrew: שולמית נדלר; 1923-2016) was a prominent Israeli modernist architect best known for her design of the National Library of Israel.

== Life ==
Shulamit Knibski Hebrew: שולמית קָניֶבסקי was born in Tel Aviv on August 16, 1923, to Rachel and Yitzhak Kanev.

Knibski trained at the Technion under Zeev Rechter; she was the second woman to complete an architectural degree at the school. At Technion, she met Michael Nadler (Hebrew: מיכאל נדלר), who became her husband and longtime architectural partner after her graduation.

In 1970, Nadler won the Rokach Prize.

Shulamit Nadler died in 2016 at the age of 93.

== Work ==
- Beit Sokolov, Tel Aviv, 1948
- Israeli Agricultural Bank (Hebrew: בנק החקלאות לישראל), Tel Aviv, 1925
- National Library of Israel, Jerusalem, 1956
- Jerusalem Theatre, Jerusalem, designed 1958
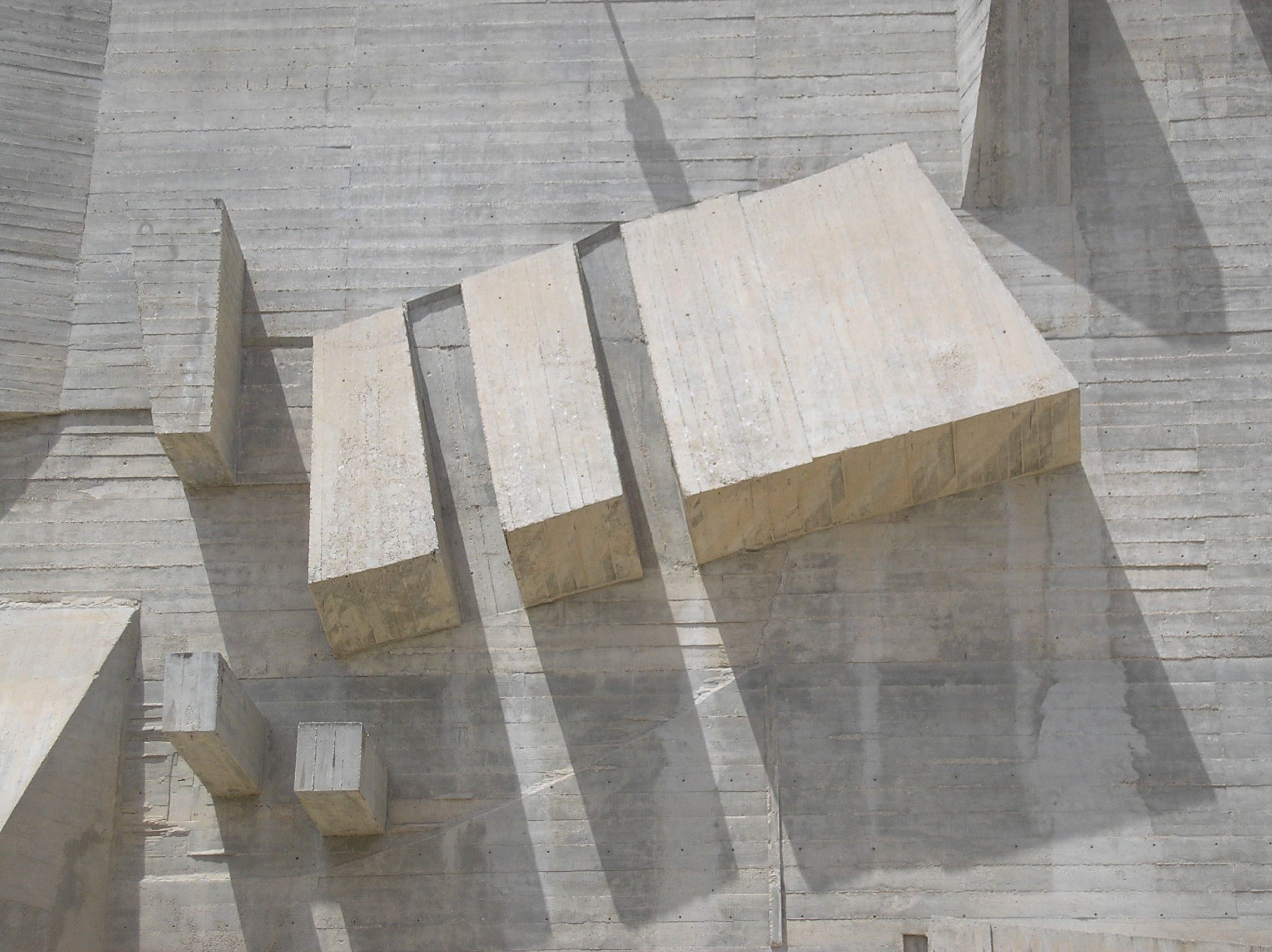
Jerusalem Theatre (designed 1958), Jerusalem

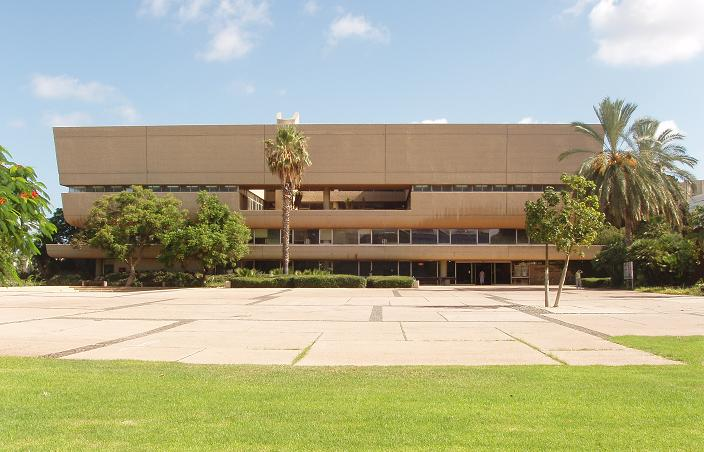
Sourasky Central Library at Tel Aviv University (1964), Tel Aviv

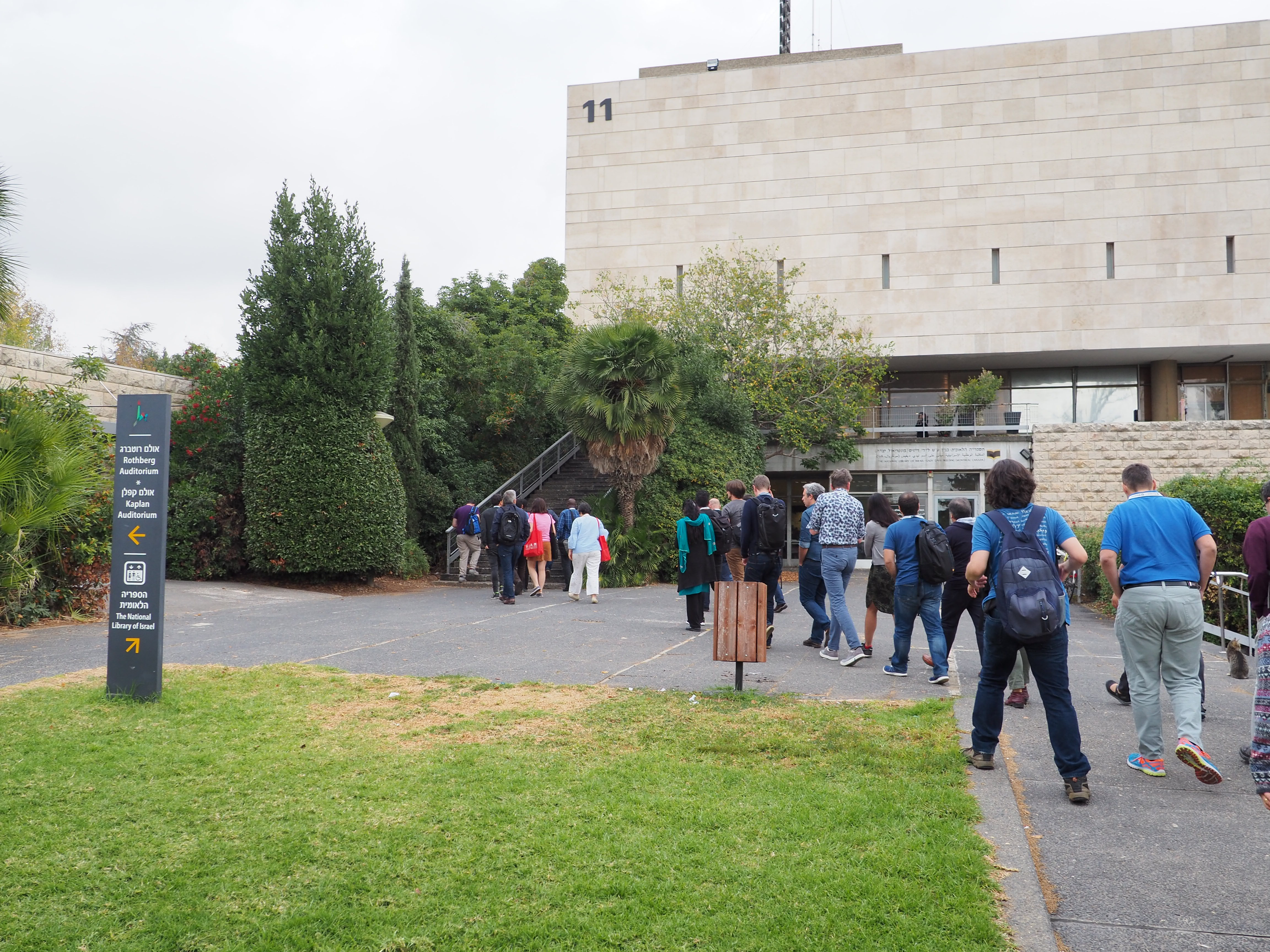
National Library of Israel (1956), Jerusalem

== Books ==
- Zvi Elhyani, Michael Jacobson: Nadler, Nadler, Bixon & Gil, Architecture 1946-2010, 462 pages, Hebrew & English, Public school, 2016
