= Kirsten Bibbins-Domingo =

American epidemiologist and physician

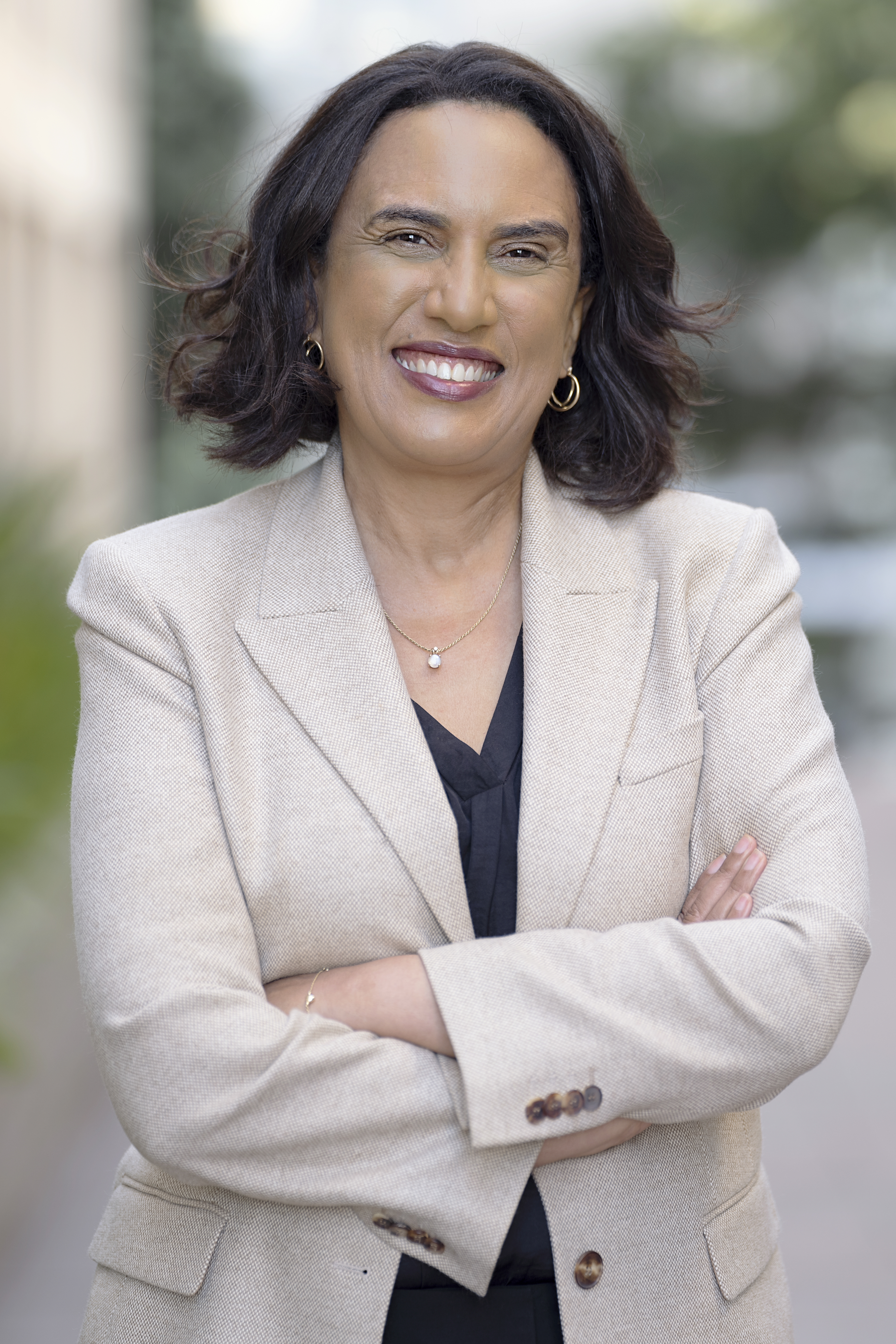
Kirsten Bibbins-Domingo in 2021

Kirsten Bibbins-Domingo is an American epidemiologist and physician. She is the 17th Editor in Chief of the Journal of the American Medical Association (JAMA) and the JAMA Network. She is Professor of Epidemiology and Biostatistics and the Lee Goldman, MD Endowed Professor of Medicine at University of California, San Francisco. She is a general internist and attending physician at San Francisco General Hospital.

Bibbins-Domingo is a recognized expert in prevention and health equity and has published more than 200 peer-reviewed original research articles. She is a cardiovascular disease epidemiologist whose work focuses on clinical and public health approaches to prevention, particularly in young adults. She served as the chair, vice-chair, and member of the United States Preventive Services Task Force from 2010 to 2017.

At UCSF she served as the inaugural Vice Dean for Population Health and Health Equity in the UCSF School of Medicine, and was the Chair of the UCSF Department of Epidemiology and Biostatistics from 2017 to 2022. In 2006, Bibbins-Domingo co-founded the UCSF Center for Vulnerable Populations at Zuckerberg San Francisco General Hospital, a research center focused on advancing health equity and reducing health disparities in the San Francisco Bay Area, nationally, and globally.

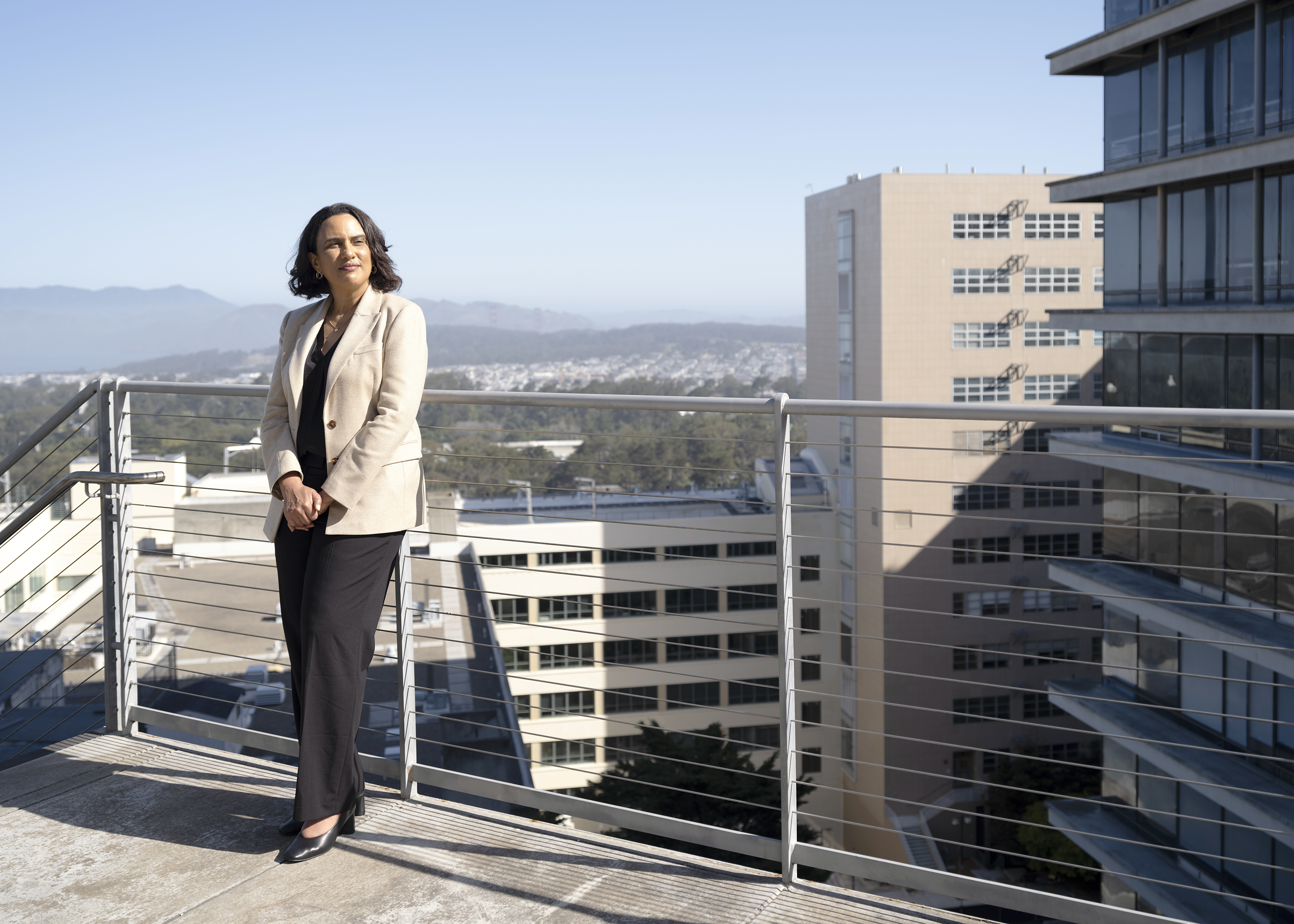
Kirsten Bibbins-Domingo at UCSF Parnassus

Bibbins-Domingo was a trustee of Princeton University from 2018 to 2022.

== Early life and college ==
Kirsten Bibbins-Domingo was born in Stuttgart, Germany while her father was stationed in the country. Bibbins-Domingo attended Eleanor Roosevelt, a public science tech high school in Maryland.

She graduated from Princeton University in 1987 with a degree in molecular biology and the Princeton School of Public and International Affairs. She then received a PhD in biochemistry, an MD, and a Masters in Clinical Research from the University of California, San Francisco. Her Ph.D. advisor was Harold E. Varmus. Bibbins-Domingo also studied chemistry at the University of Ibadan.

== Career ==
Bibbins-Domingo is an NIH funded investigator who uses observational studies, simulation models, and pragmatic trials to understand the development of cardiovascular risk and examine the impact of clinical and public health approaches to cardiovascular disease prevention.

Her work published in the New England Journal of Medicine highlighted the high rate of incident heart failure among African American men and women before age 50 She has also published on the impact or adolescent obesity on future rates of cardiovascular disease in young adults. She has led two NIH center grants focused on disparities in diabetes, cardiovascular disease, and stroke in young adulthood.

Her work has examined the population health impact of policy approaches to reduce consumption of salt and sugary beverages. in the US and in other countries. These publications helped inform policy changes and public health interventions, including taxation of sugary beverages and interventions aimed at population-wide reductions in dietary sodium.

Bibbins-Domingo published a series of cost-effectiveness analyses on the PCSK-9 inhibitor medications in JAMA and Annals of Internal Medicine.

In 2016, she was named chair of the U.S. Preventive Services Task Force and led the US Preventive Services Task Force during several high-profile recommendations on breast cancer, colon cancer, and prostate cancer. six years after she became a member of the task force. In 2017, the U.S. Preventive Services Task Force changed their recommendation on PSA testing for prostate cancer and Bibbins-Domingo appeared on PBS in 2017 to describe this decision.

== Honors and awards ==
Bibbins-Domingo is an inducted member of the American Society for Clinical Investigation, the Association of American Physicians, and the National Academy of Medicine.

In 2017, Bibbins-Domingo received the UCSF Chancellor's Award for Public Service. In the same year she was selected to deliver the Ancel Keyes Lecture by the American Heart Association Epidemiology Council.

Bibbins-Domingo has received mentoring awards from the Society of General Internal Medicine and UCSF Phillip R. Lee Institute for Health Policy Studies.

While at Princeton, Bibbins-Domingo received the Moses Taylor Pyne Prize as a senior.

== Personal life ==
Bibbins-Domingo's son, Stephen played college basketball for Georgetown and the University of California, Berkeley. He graduated from the Haas School of Business in 2017 and has played professional basketball in the Dutch Basketball League. He is currently a small forward for the Osceola Magic. Kirsten Bibbins-Domingo is married to Patrick Domingo.

== Works ==
- Disease Prevention, An Issue of Medical Clinics of North America, The Clinics Internal Medicine series, co-authored with Michael P. Pignone MD, Elsevier, 2017, ISBN 978-0323531382
