= Daniel Nadler =

Canadian-born technology entrepreneur, poet, and film producer

Daniel J. Nadler
- Born: 1983; Toronto, Ontario, Canada
- Citizenship: Canadian
- Education: Harvard University (PhD)
- Occupations: Entrepreneur; poet; artist
- Organization: OpenEvidence
- Title: Founder and CEO
- Board member of: Academy of American Poets; MoMA PS1; Whitney Museum (Digital Art Committee)

Daniel J. Nadler (born 1983) is a Canadian-born billionaire entrepreneur and poet. He is the founder and CEO of OpenEvidence, an artificial intelligence company that develops a medical search and clinical decision-support platform for physicians. He previously founded Kensho Technologies, which was acquired by S&P Global in 2018.

Nadler's debut poetry collection, Lacunae: 100 Imagined Ancient Love Poems (2016), was described by The Washington Post as a "striking debut". He was included in the Time 100 Health list of the 100 most influential individuals in global health. As of 2026, Forbes estimated his net worth was at US$7.6 billion.

== Early life ==
Daniel Nadler was born in Toronto, Ontario, the son of immigrants from Poland and Romania. His father was an engineer who specialized in using sound to detect microscopic cracks in structures like bridges and submarines. Nadler attended Harvard University where he studied mathematics and classics, and poetry under the mentorship of Pulitzer Prize winner Jorie Graham. In 2016 Nadler received a PhD, also from Harvard, with a doctoral thesis on the pricing mechanisms of credit derivatives. He was a visiting scholar at the Federal Reserve during his PhD studies.

== Career ==
=== Kensho Technologies ===
In 2013, while a PhD student, Nadler co-founded (with Peter Kruskall) Kensho Technologies, an artificial intelligence company that developed machine learning systems. The software allows a user to perform financial analysis like a google search engine. Nadler leased it to Wall Street asset managers. In 2018 Kensho was acquired by S&P Global for US$550 million.

=== Literary and artistic work ===
Nadler's debut collection of poetry, Lacunae: 100 Imagined Ancient Love Poems, was published by the American book publishing company Farrar, Straus and Giroux in 2016.

In film, Nadler has served as a financier and producer. He was a co-financier and producer on the 2021 drama Palmer starring Justin Timberlake, and served as an executive producer on the film Motherless Brooklyn (2019).

=== OpenEvidence ===
In 2022 Nadler co-founded OpenEvidence, an artificial intelligence company that develops a medical search and clinical decision-support platform for physicians.

It has content agreements with NEJM Group, publisher of The New England Journal of Medicine (2025), and the American Medical Association's JAMA Network (2025), and the American Medical Association's JAMA Network (2025). In May 2026, the company reported that about 65% of US physicians used the platform. Health systems including Mount Sinai and Cedars-Sinai have integrated it into their clinical workflows.

== Recognition ==
On May 8, 2025, Nadler was listed in the TIME100 Health list of the 100 most influential individuals in global health. In 2026, he was named to TIME Magazine's TIME100 AI list, which recognizes the 100 influential individuals in artificial intelligence.

== Personal life ==
As of 2026, Nadler resides in Surfside, Florida. According to Forbes, his estimated net worth was approximately US $7.6 billion.
