= Fred Rivara =

American professor (born 1949)

Frederick P. Rivara
- Born: May 17, 1949 (age 77)
- Education: MD University of Pennsylvania; MPH University of Washington

Fred Rivara (born May 17, 1949) is a professor of pediatrics and epidemiology at the University of Washington at Seattle Children's Hospital known for his research into the relationship between gun ownership and gun violence in the 1990s. Rivara has also researched bicycle helmets, intimate partner violence, and alcohol abuse, among other topics.

== Education ==
Rivara earned his doctor of medicine in 1974 from the University of Pennsylvania. In 1980, he completed a master's in public health at the University of Washington.

== Career ==
Rivara's career spans 30 years. His research has covered topics such as alcohol abuse and domestic violence, and he has been a vocal advocate for the use of bicycle helmets to reduce injury. Rivara says that his work has helped to drastically reduce the number of children who are injured while riding bikes. He founded the Harborview Injury and Research Center in Seattle and the International Society for Child and Adolescent Injury Prevention. At the University of Washington, Rivara is vice chair of the Department of Pediatrics in the School of Medicine and chief of the Division of General Pediatrics and. Rivara was also editor-in-chief of the journal JAMA Pediatrics and then JAMA Network Open.

=== Gun violence research ===
In the 1990s, Rivara received funding from the Centers for Disease Control and Prevention to research the relationship between gun ownership and gun violence. His research found that the chances of homicide or suicide increase threefold when there is a gun present in a home, while the risk of suicide for teens increases as much as tenfold. Rivara and his colleagues published their research in the New England Journal of Medicine in 1993 in a series of articles on their findings.

“[Our research] underwent peer review and was thought to be very solid and worthwhile research,” Rivara told PRI program The Takeaway in a 2015 interview. “The CDC stood by our research—they had funded it and they stood by it. Unfortunately, it raised the attention of the National Rifle Association, who then worked with pro-gun members of Congress to essentially stop funding firearm research.”

The NRA then lobbied Congress, saying that since guns aren't a disease, CDC funds should not be allocated to them. A bill passed that prevented the CDC from setting aside funds for gun research.

== Awards ==
Some awards Rivara has received include:

- Charles C. Shepard Science Award from the Centers for Disease Control and Prevention
- Injury Control and Emergency Health Services Section Distinguished Career Award
- American Academy of Pediatrics, Section on Injury and Poison Prevention, Physician Achievement Award
- UW School of Public Health Distinguished Alumni Award
