= JAMA Network Open =

- Discipline: Medicine
- Language: English
- Edited by: Eli Perencevich

Publication details
- History: 2018-present
- Publisher: American Medical Association
- Frequency: Monthly
- Open access: Yes
- License: CC BY, CC BY-NC-ND
- Impact factor: 13.353 (2021)

Standard abbreviations
- ISO 4: JAMA Netw. Open

Indexing
- ISSN: 2574-3805
- LCCN: 2017201880
- OCLC no.: 1001466479

Links
- Journal homepage; Online access

JAMA Network Open is a monthly open access medical journal published by the American Medical Association covering all aspects of the biomedical sciences. It was established in 2018 and the founding editor-in-chief was Fred Rivara (University of Washington); since 2024, Eli Perencevich (University of Iowa) has been editor-in-chief. The journal is funded by article processing charges and most articles are available under a Creative Commons license. Article titles and abstracts are translated into Spanish and Chinese. According to Journal Citation Reports, the journal has a 2021 impact factor of 13.353, ranking it 15th out of 172 journals in the category "Medicine, General & Internal". Additionally, it ranks 5th among purely open access journals in that subject category.

== Abstracting and indexing ==
The journal is abstracted and indexed in CINAHL, Emerging Sources Citation Index, and Index Medicus/MEDLINE/PubMed.

== See also ==
- List of American Medical Association journals
