= Jonathan Skinner (economist) =

American economist

Academic background
- Education: University of California, Los Angeles (Ph.D., 1983)
- Academic advisor: Laurence J. Kotlikoff

Academic work
- Discipline: Health economics
- Awards: Robert Wood Johnson Foundation Investigator Award
- Website: jonskinner.org; Information at IDEAS / RePEc

Jonathan Snowden Skinner is an American health economist and the James O. Freedman Presidential Professor in Economics at Dartmouth College, as well as a professor in the Department of Family and Community Medicine at Dartmouth's Geisel School of Medicine and at The Dartmouth Institute for Health Policy and Clinical Practice. He is known for his research on health care spending. He has been a member of the National Academy of Medicine (formerly known as the Institute of Medicine) since 2007.

== Bibliography ==
- Chandra, Amitabh; Jonathan Skinner (2012). "Technology Growth and Expenditure Growth in Health Care". Journal of Economic Literature. 50 (3): 645–80. doi:10.1257/jel.50.3.645. JSTOR 23270474. S2CID 15297512.
- Garber, Alan M.; Jonathan Skinner (2008). "Is American Health Care Uniquely Inefficient?". The Journal of Economic Perspectives. 22 (4): 27–50. doi:10.1257/jep.22.4.27. JSTOR 27648276. PMC 2659297. PMID 19305645.
