= Robert Bonow =

American cardiologist

- Born: Robert O. Bonow
- Education: University of Pennsylvania (MD)
- Occupation: Cardiologist

Robert O. Bonow is an American cardiologist, currently the Max and Lilly Goldberg Distinguished Professor of Cardiology at Northwestern University Feinberg School of Medicine and also editor-in-chief of JAMA's JAMA Cardiology. He received his MD at the University of Pennsylvania in 1973.
