= List of American Medical Association journals =

There are thirteen medical journals published by the JAMA Network, a division of the American Medical Association (AMA). The Journal of the American Medical Association (JAMA), along with JAMA Network Open and eleven specialty journals, compose the JAMA Network family of journals. The journals share a common website, archives and other means of access (such as RSS feeds), have common policies on publishing and public relations, and pool their editorial resources in producing the AMA Manual of Style.

They also operate a common webpage, For The Media, that provides free access to news releases about the latest research published in AMA journals to credentialed journalists prior to official publication dates (pre-embargo content), as well as access to all related pre-embargo (pre-publication) news releases and video news release scripts.

Before they were rebranded as the JAMA Network in 2013, the AMA's stable of journals were referred to as JAMA and the Archives journals (for example, this is how the AMA Manual of Style formerly referred to them), because the specialty journals used to have titles on the pattern of Archives of [Specialty].

JAMA Network recently created four new journals: JAMA Oncology in 2015, JAMA Cardiology in 2016, JAMA Network Open in 2018, and JAMA Health Forum in 2021

As of 2023, the Network has adopted a new policy whereby any manuscript accepted for publication may be deposited by the author into a "public repository of their choosing" on the day that the paper is published by the Network, which remains the repository of record.

== Journals ==
- JAMA: Journal of the American Medical Association
- JAMA Cardiology
- JAMA Dermatology
- JAMA Health Forum
- JAMA Internal Medicine
- JAMA Network Open
- JAMA Neurology
- JAMA Oncology
- JAMA Ophthalmology
- JAMA Otolaryngology–Head & Neck Surgery
- JAMA Pediatrics
- JAMA Plus AI
- JAMA Plus Trials
- JAMA Plus Women's Health
- JAMA Psychiatry
- JAMA Surgery
