= JAMA Neurology =

Medical journal focused on neurology

- Discipline: Neurology
- Language: English
- Edited by: S. Andrew Josephson

Publication details
- Former names: Archives of Neurology (1960-2013); A.M.A. Archives of Neurology (1959-1960); A.M.A. Archives of Neurology and Psychiatry (1950-1959); Archives of Neurology and Psychiatry (1919-1950)
- History: 1919-present
- Publisher: American Medical Association
- Frequency: Monthly
- Impact factor: 29.907 (2021)

Standard abbreviations
- ISO 4: JAMA Neurol.

Indexing
- CODEN: ANNED3
- ISSN: 2168-6149 (print); 2168-6157 (web)
- LCCN: 61066291
- OCLC no.: 828795097

Links
- Journal homepage; Online access; Online archive

JAMA Neurology is a monthly peer-reviewed medical journal published by the American Medical Association. It was established in 1960 as Archives of Neurology and obtained its current name in 2013. The journal publishes research on the nervous system as well as the various mechanisms of neurological disease. Its editor-in-chief is S. Andrew Josephson.

== Naming History ==
JAMA Neurology- Historical Name Changes
Title	Year	ISSN
JAMA Neurology	2013-	2168-6149 (print), 2168-6157 (online)
Archives of Neurology	1960-2013	0003–9942
A.M.A. Archives of Neurology	1959-1960	0375–8540
A.M.A. Archives of Neurology and Psychiatry	1950-1959	0096–6886
Archives of Neurology and Psychiatry	1919-1950	0096–6754

== Abstracting and indexing ==
The journal is abstracted and indexed in Index Medicus/MEDLINE/PubMed. According to Journal Citation Reports, the journal's 2021 impact factor is 29.907, ranking it 3rd out of 212 titles in the category "Clinical Neurology".

== See also ==
- List of American Medical Association journals
