= Jeffrey P. Nadler =

American physician

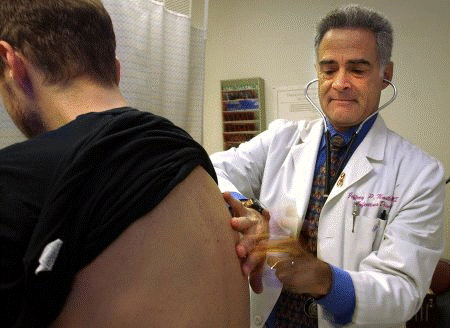
Dr. Jeffrey Nadler, University of South Florida (USF) College of Medicine, Division of Infectious Diseases

Jeffrey P. Nadler (born 27 February 1950, in Brooklyn, New York - died 26 November 2010) was an American Infectious Diseases and HIV/AIDS expert. His most recent position had been as Acting Director and Assistant Director of the Therapeutics Research Program, Division of AIDS (DAIDS), National Institute of Allergy and Infectious Diseases (NIAID) where he oversaw NIH/NIAID-sponsored national and international HIV/AIDS research.

He was well known for his service as an expert HIV consultant to the Association of Physicians of India (API), as a facilitator to the creation of the first guidelines for use of antiretroviral therapy in India, and for training countless Indian physicians in the treatment of HIV/AIDS through the NGO, CHART-India. His reputation as physician-adventurer was also of note. He treated climbers while ascending Mount Everest, sailors while racing around the world, and indigenous peoples while backpacking along the Amazon River in Brazil and while hacking his way through the jungles of Peru on a mapmaking expedition. A master HIV clinician of international repute, he has treated patients with HIV and AIDS in Brazil, the Czech Republic, Hungary, India, Russia and the United States.

== Early life and education ==
Nadler was born 27 February 1950 in Brooklyn, New York to Mae and Abraham Nadler, a teacher and a career civil servant for the United States Commerce Department, respectively. He earned a B.A. from SUNY Buffalo in 1971 and completed a National Science Foundation summer research fellowship prior to graduation. Nadler was awarded his medical degree (M.D.) in 1975 from the New York Medical College New York, NY, where he received the Community and Preventive Medicine Scholarship. Dr. Nadler completed his post-doctoral residency training in Internal Medicine at the New York Medical College (1975–78) and fellowship training in Infectious Diseases at the Albert Einstein College of Medicine in the Bronx, New York (1978–80).

== Career ==
Since 2006, Dr. Nadler had been deputy director and then acting director of the Therapeutics Research Program, Division of AIDS, National Institute of Allergy and Infectious Diseases (DAIDS/NIAID). While serving in NIAID, one of the National Institutes of Health (NIH) in Bethesda, Maryland, Nadler worked with the President's Emergency Plan for AIDS Relief (PEPFAR) to help improve and increase access to treatment in developing nations, particularly in Africa. He has also helped NIAID plan a new agenda for improving tuberculosis (TB) treatment in people infected with both HIV and TB. Prior to coming to the NIH, Nadler was on faculty at the University of South Florida (USF) College of Medicine for nearly 20 years. During his tenure there, he served as a professor of medicine, public health and nursing and as director of clinical research for the USF Division of Infectious Diseases. While director of research, Nadler oversaw Phase I, II and III clinical trials that contributed to the development of more than 20 antiretroviral drugs for the treatment of HIV.

Dr. Nadler held several academic posts in New York from 1981 to 1987. He served as Assistant Professor of Medicine at the SUNY Downstate Medical Center at Brooklyn, as Chief of Infectious Diseases at the Brooklyn Veterans Administration Medical Center (VAMC) and as the acting Chief of Medicine (1985–1986). Seeking warmer climes, he and his wife Constance (a Florida native), moved to St. Petersburg, Florida, where Dr. Nadler served as Chief of Infectious Diseases at the Bay Pines VAMC, prior to joining the faculty at the USF College of Medicine.

== Awards and recognition ==
Dr. Jeffrey Nadler is a member of Sigma Xi, received the Career Achievement in Research Award, USF Division of Infectious Diseases in 2003 and the Excellence in Service and Teaching Award, USF Division of Infectious Diseases in 1993. He has served as a reviewer or guest editor for fourteen different journals, and has published over one hundred papers in the peer-reviewed medical literature.

== Physician-Adventurer ==
Whitbread Race

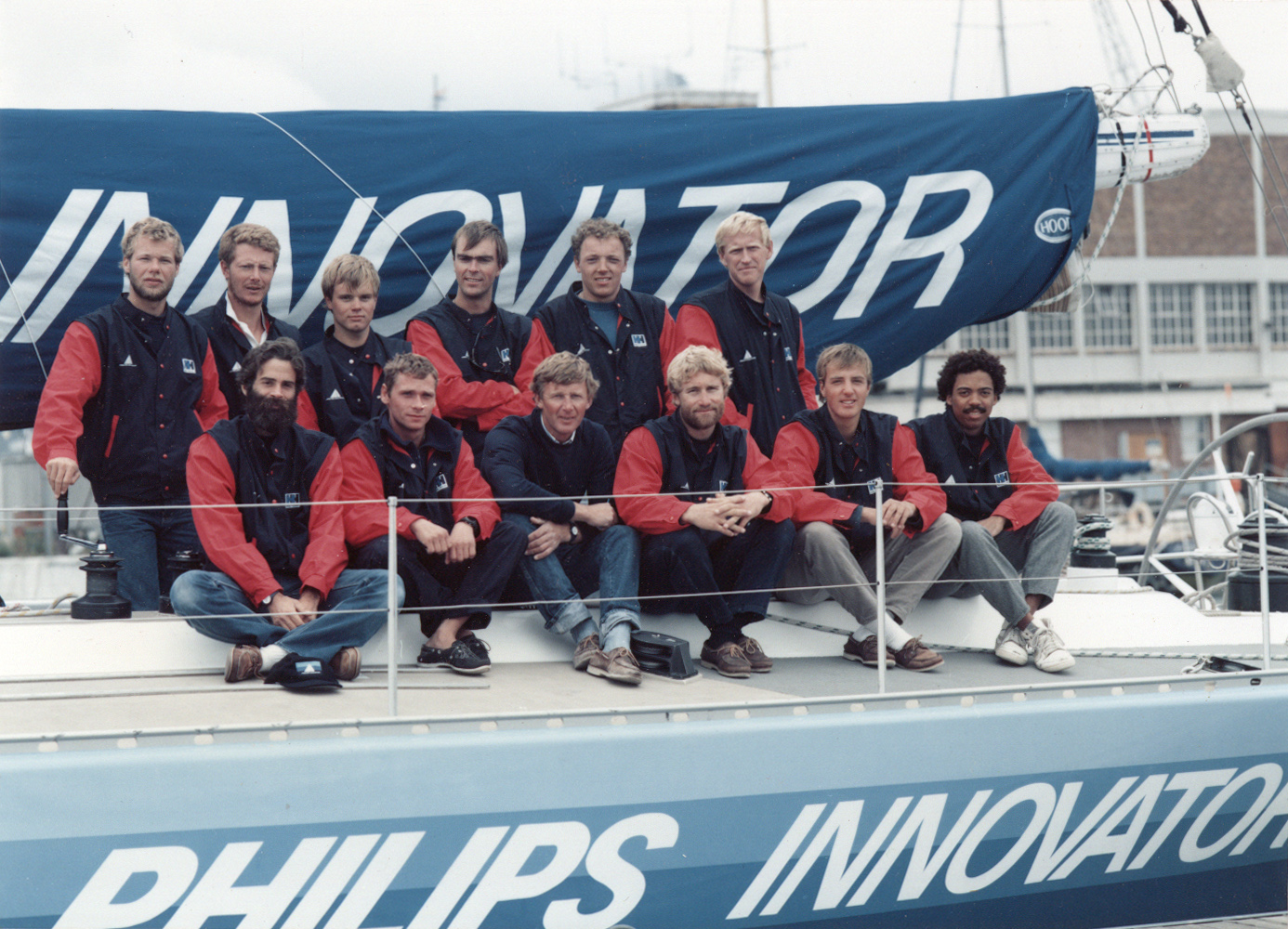
Bottom row, far left: Jeffrey Nadler, crew, Philips Innovator (Dutch entry), Whitbread Race Around the World (now called the Volvo Ocean Race)

The Whitbread Round the World Race (now called the Volvo Ocean Race) is an around the world sailing race that takes place every three years and originates at a port in Europe. Nadler sailed as crew/physician with the Dutch entry, Philips Innovator, in 1985-86 against fifteen other boats. The course when Nadler sailed it was divided into four legs: 1. Southampton, England to Cape Town, South Africa; 2. Cape Town to Auckland, New Zealand; 3. Auckland to Punta del Este, Uruguay; and 4. Punta del Este to Portsmouth, England. Philips Innovator won the second leg and finished second overall to L'Esprit d'Equipe (1985–86 Whitbread Round the World Race).

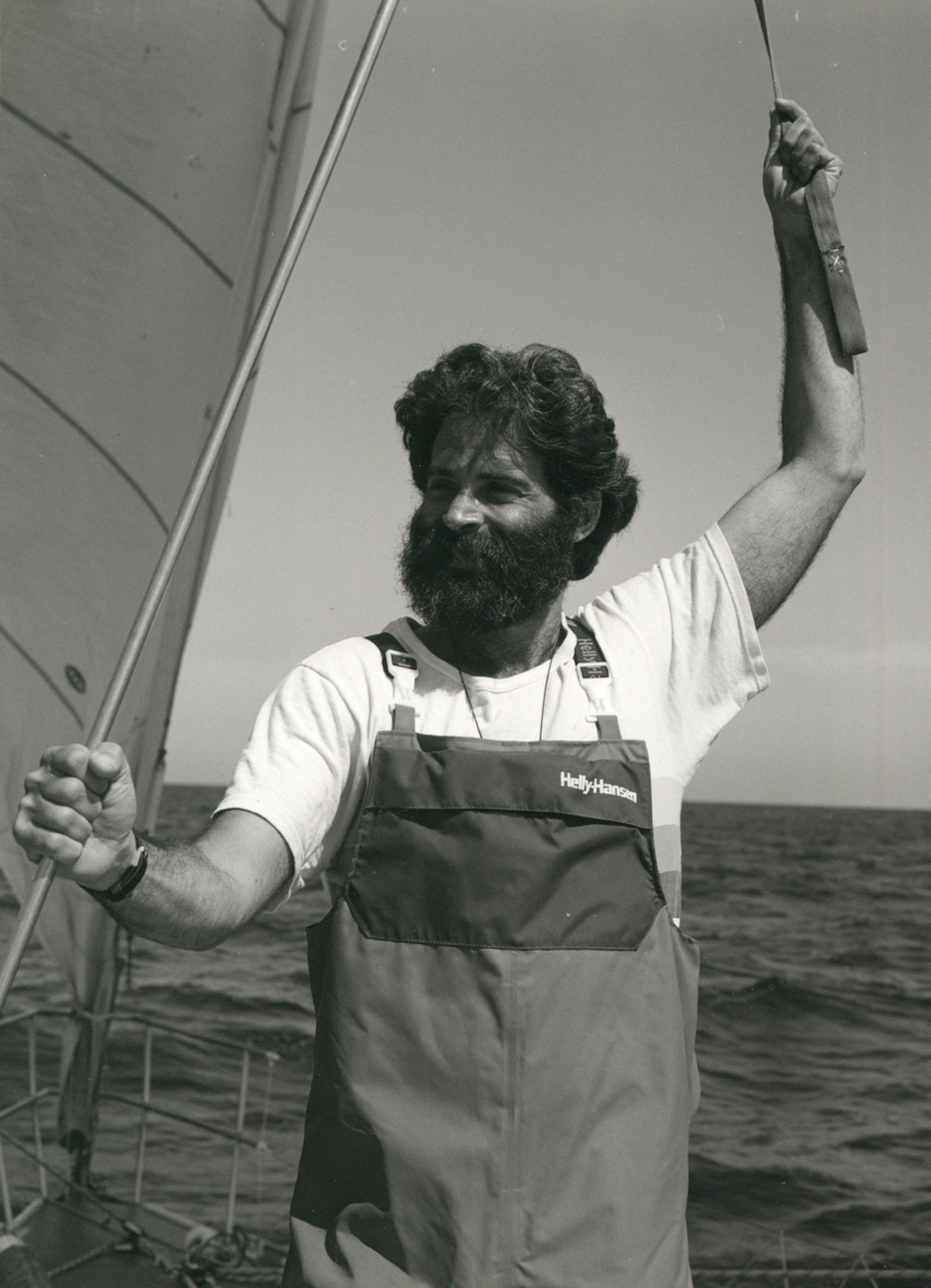
Jeffrey Nadler, crew, Whitbread Race

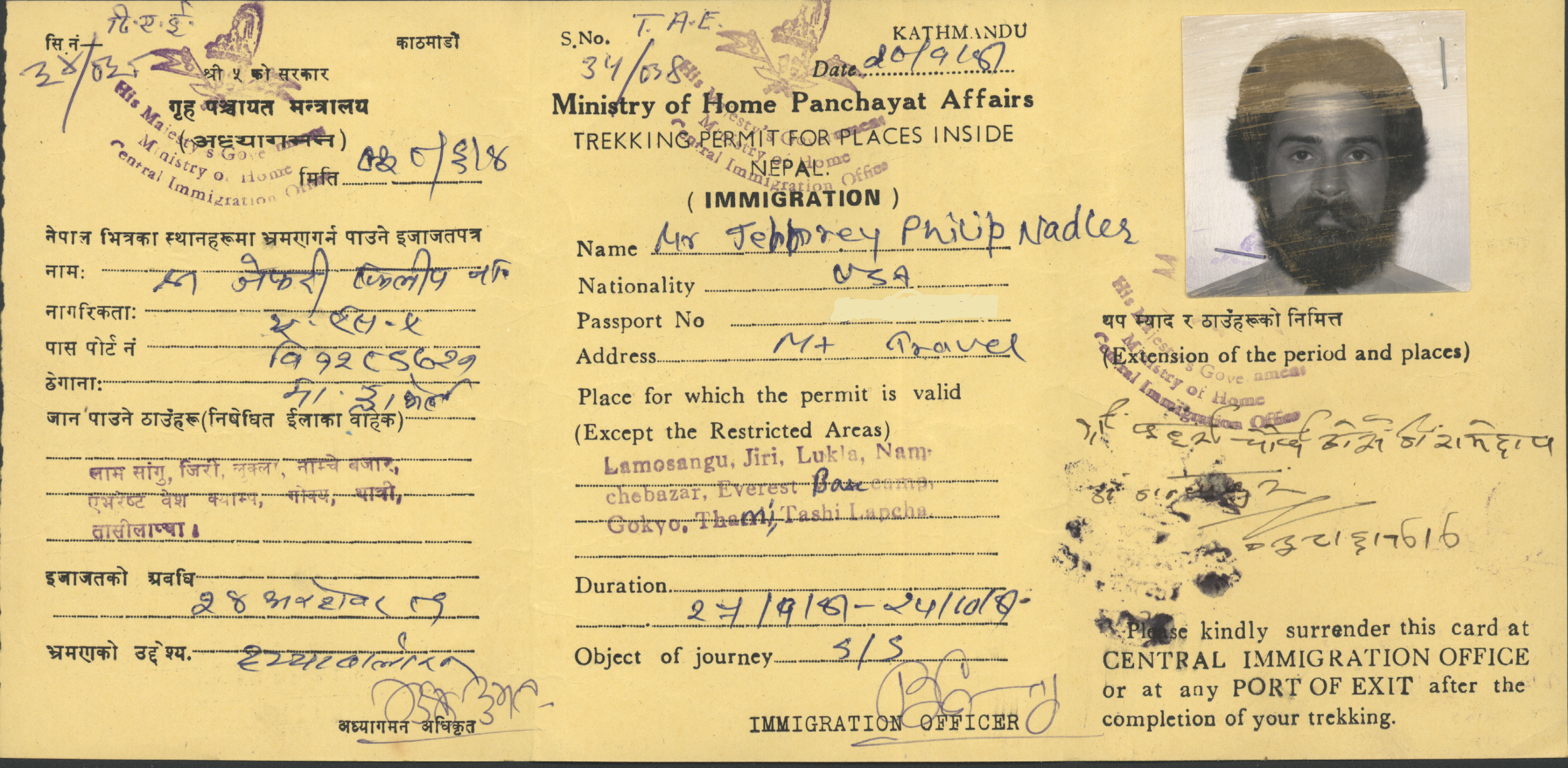
Trekking permit granted by Nepal to Jeff Nadler in 1981 to climb Mt. Everest
