= Yitzhak Kanev =

Israeli politician

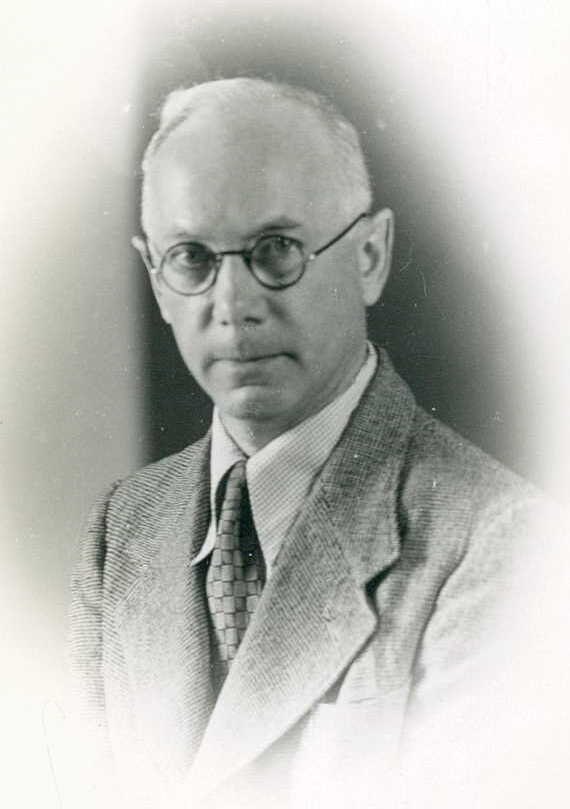
- Kanev in the early 1950s

Faction represented in the Knesset
- 1950–1951: Mapai

Personal details
- Born: 1896 Melitopol, Russian Empire
- Died: 8 May 1980 (aged 83–84)

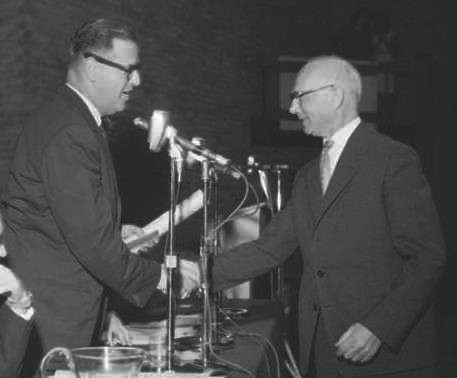
Kanev (right) accepting his Israel Prize in 1962

Yitzhak Kanev (Hebrew: יִצְחָק קַנֵּב; 1896 – 8 May 1980) was a Zionist activist and politician. He was the founder of the Kupat Holim health care system and directed it for 38 years.

== Biography ==
Born Isaac Kanevsky in Melitopol in the Russian Empire (today in Ukraine), Kanev studied Natural Sciences and Economics at university in Crimea, and later social sciences at the University of London, the University of Vienna, and the School of Economics & Law in Tel Aviv. In 1917, Kanievsky joined the Jewish Self Defense in Russia, and was one of the founders of the Russian branch of HeHalutz. He also served as a delegate to the Tzeiri Zion convention and the General Zionist Convention in St Petersburg.

In 1919 Kanev emigrated to Palestine. The following year he fought in the Battle of Tel Hai, where he was wounded. He later helped found Gdud HaAvoda and attended the convention that established the Histadrut trade union. In 1923, he became one of the leaders of the Histadrut's medical services, and in 1947 he established the Institute for Social Research, where he served as a director.

Given a place on the Mapai list for the 1949 Knesset elections, he missed out on a seat as the party won 46 seats. However, he entered the Knesset on 20 April 1950 as a replacement for the deceased Avraham Taviv. He lost his seat in the 1951 elections.

- In 1962 Kanev was awarded the Israel Prize in social sciences.

He died in 1980.

== Works ==
- Social policy and social insurance in Palestine (1942)
- Social insurance in Palestine and its reconstruction (1946)
- Society in Israel and social planning (1962)
- Social policy in Israel: Achievements and shortcomings (1964)
- Health, services in Israel and public expenditure on health and international comparisons (1965/66–1967/68) (1969)
- Social and health research, 1964-1965 (1966)
- Israel's war on poverty and new approaches to rehabilitation (1971)

== See also ==
- List of Israel Prize recipients
