= JAMA Oncology =

- Discipline: Oncology
- Language: English
- Edited by: Mary L. Disis

Publication details
- History: 2015-present
- Publisher: American Medical Association
- Frequency: Monthly
- Impact factor: 33.006 (2021)

Standard abbreviations
- ISO 4: JAMA Oncol.

Indexing
- ISSN: 2374-2437 (print); 2374-2445 (web)

Links
- Journal homepage; Online access; Online archive

JAMA Oncology is a monthly peer-reviewed medical journal published by the American Medical Association. It covers all aspects of medical oncology, radiation oncology, and surgical oncology, as well as subspecialties. The journal was established in 2015. The founding editor-in-chief is Mary L. Disis.

== Abstracting and indexing ==
The journal is abstracted and indexed in Index Medicus/MEDLINE/PubMed. According to Journal Citation Reports, the journal's 2021 impact factor is 33.006, ranking it 10th out of 246 titles in the category "Oncology".

== See also ==
- List of American Medical Association journals
