= JAMA =

Peer-reviewed medical journal published by the American Medical Association

The Journal of the American Medical Association
- Discipline: Medicine
- Language: English
- Edited by: Kirsten Bibbins-Domingo

Publication details
- Former names: Transactions of the American Medical Association; Journal of the American Medical Association
- History: 1883–present
- Publisher: American Medical Association (United States)
- Frequency: 48/year
- Open access: Delayed (6 months)
- Impact factor: 65.4 (2025)

Standard abbreviations
- ISO 4: JAMA

Indexing
- CODEN: JAMAAP
- ISSN: 0098-7484 (print); 1538-3598 (web)
- LCCN: 82643544
- OCLC no.: 1124917
- Until 1960
- ISSN: 0002-9955

Links
- Journal homepage; Online access; Online archive

The Journal of the American Medical Association (JAMA) is a peer-reviewed medical journal published 48 times a year by the American Medical Association. It publishes original research, reviews, and editorials covering all aspects of biomedicine. The journal was established in 1883 with Nathan Smith Davis as the founding editor. Its publisher describes it as the most widely circulated general medical journal in the world, with more than 101,000 print recipients, more than 2.9 million recipients of electronic tables of contents and alerts, and over 29 million annual website visits. Kirsten Bibbins-Domingo of the University of California, San Francisco, became the journal editor-in-chief on July 1, 2022, succeeding Howard Bauchner of Boston University.

According to Journal Citation Reports, the journal's 2025 impact factor is 65.4, ranking it 4th out of 336 journals in the category "Medicine, General & Internal". JAMA Network reports that the journal accepts 10% of more than 11,500 annual submissions and 4% of more than 5,400 research manuscripts. The journal office is located in Chicago, IL, USA.

== History ==
The journal was established in 1883 by the American Medical Association and superseded the Transactions of the American Medical Association. In the late nineteenth century, medical journals closely resembled other kinds of journalism, and publishing in the journal was understood as a privilege of AMA membership. Prior to the 1920s, the editor's main concern was with filling the journal, but between the 1910s and the mid-1920s JAMA entered the "turndown era," when submission volume was high enough to start rejecting submissions based on quality. The journal did not institutionalize routine peer review until after World War II. In 1960, the journal obtained its current title, JAMA: The Journal of the American Medical Association. The journal is commonly referred to as JAMA.

== Continuing medical education ==
Continuing Education Opportunities for Physicians was a semiannual journal section providing lists for regional or national levels of continuing medical education (CME). Between 1937 and 1955, the list was produced either quarterly or semiannually. Between 1955 and 1981, the list was available annually, as the number of CME offerings increased from 1,000 (1955) to 8,500 (1981). In 2016, CME transitioned into a digital offering from the JAMA Network called JN Learning CME & MOC from JAMA Network. JN Learning provides CME and MOC credit from article and audio materials published within all 12 JAMA Network journals, including JAMA.

== Publication of article by Barack Obama ==
On 11 July 2016, JAMA published an article by Barack Obama entitled "United States Health Care Reform: Progress to Date and Next Steps", which was the first academic paper ever published by a sitting U.S. president. The article was not subject to blind peer-review. It argued for specific policies that future presidents could pursue in order to improve national health care reform implementation.

== Policy shift ==
After the controversial 1999 firing of an editor-in-chief, George D. Lundberg, a process was put in place to ensure editorial freedom. A seven-member journal oversight committee was created to evaluate the editor-in-chief and to help ensure editorial independence. Since its inception, the committee has met at least once a year. Presently, JAMA policy states that article content should be attributed to authors, not to the publisher.

=== Artwork ===
From 1964 to 2013, JAMA used images of artwork on its cover and it published essays commenting on the artwork. According to former editor George Lundberg, this practice was designed to link the humanities and medicine. In 2013, a format redesign moved the art feature to an inside page, replacing an image of the artwork on the cover with a table of contents. The purpose of the redesign was to standardize the appearance of all journals in the JAMA Network. The arts feature was discontinued in 2024.

== Racism controversy ==
A February 2021 JAMA podcast proposed that "structural racism is an unfortunate term to describe a very real problem" and that "taking racism out of the conversation would help" to ensure "all people who lived in disadvantaged circumstances have equal opportunities to become successful and have better qualities of life." A JAMA tweet wrote "No physician is racist, so how can there be structural racism in health care?” The comments were immediately criticized by some, resulting in deletion of the podcast and resignation of the Deputy Editor. On June 1, 2021, the editor-in-chief Howard Bauchner announced that he would resign effective June 30, 2021 to "create an opportunity for new leadership at JAMA." Columnists Eric Zorn and Daniel Henninger asserted in separate Op-Eds that the resignation of the two editors was an unfortunate substitute for meaningful conversations about racism and health care, and the episode was highlighted as a case study of social media, polarization, and radicalization in Greg Lukianoff and Rikki Schlott's 2023 book The Canceling of the American Mind. Bauchner now serves as a professor of medicine and pediatrics at the Boston University School of Medicine.

== Previous chief editors ==
The following people have been editor-in-chief of JAMA:

- Nathan S. Davis (1883–1888)
- John B. Hamilton (1889, 1893–1898)
- John H. Hollister (1889–1891)
- James C. Culbertson (1891–1893)
- Truman W. Miller (1899)
- George H. Simmons (1899–1924)
- Morris Fishbein (1924–1949)
- Austin Smith (1949–1958)
- Johnson F. Hammond (1958–1959)
- John H. Talbott (1959–1969)
- Hugh H. Hussey (1970–1973)
- Robert H. Moser (1973–1975)
- William R. Barclay (1975–1982)
- George D. Lundberg (1982–1999)
- Catherine D. DeAngelis (2000–2011)
- Howard C. Bauchner (2011–2021)
- Kirsten Bibbins-Domingo (2021–)

== Journal ranking summary ==
JAMA – Journal of the American Medical Association consistently ranks among the leading journals in the medical field. The table below outlines its recent citation-based performance across major indexing platforms.

Journal ranking summary (2023)

Source	Category	Rank	Percentile	Quartile
Scopus	General Medicine in Medicine	6/636	99.06	Q1
IF (Web of Science)	Medicine, General & Internal	5/325	98.60	Q1
JCI (Web of Science)	Medicine, General & Internal	4/329	98.78	Q1

== Abstracting and indexing ==
JAMA is abstracted and indexed in:

- Academic OneFile
- Academic Search
- BIOSIS Previews
- Biological Abstracts
- CAB Abstracts
- Chemical Abstracts
- CINAHL
- Current Index to Statistics
- Current Contents/Clinical Medicine
- Current Contents/Life Sciences
- Elsevier BIOBASE
- Embase
- Global Health
- Index Medicus/MEDLINE/PubMed
- PsycINFO
- Science Citation Index
- Scopus
- Tropical Diseases Bulletin

== See also ==
- List of American Medical Association journals
