= Madagascar Plan =

Plan of Nazi Germany to relocate Jews of Europe to Madagascar

Madagascar lies off the east coast of Africa.

The Madagascar Plan (German: Madagaskarplan) was a plan proposed by the Nazi German government to forcibly relocate the Jewish population of Europe to the island of Madagascar. Franz Rademacher, head of the Jewish Department of the German Foreign Office, proposed the idea in June 1940, shortly before the Fall of France. The proposal called for the handing over of control of Madagascar, then a French colony, to Germany as part of the eventual peace terms.

The idea of re-settling Polish Jews to Madagascar was investigated by the French Third Republic and the Second Polish Republic in 1937, but the task force sent to evaluate the island's potential determined that only 5,000 to 7,000 families could be accommodated, or even as few as 500 families by some estimates. As the efforts by the Nazis to encourage the emigration of the Jewish population of Germany before World War II were only partially successful, the idea of deporting Jews to Madagascar was revived by the Nazi government in 1940.

Rademacher recommended on 3 June 1940 that Madagascar should be made available as a destination for the Jews of Europe. With Adolf Hitler's approval, Adolf Eichmann released a memorandum on 15 August 1940 calling for the resettlement of a million Jews per year for four years, with the island being governed as a police state under the SS. They assumed that many Jews would succumb to its harsh conditions should the plan be implemented. The plan was not viable when proposed due to the British naval blockade. It was postponed after Nazi Germany lost the Battle of Britain in September 1940, and it was permanently shelved in 1942.

== Origins ==
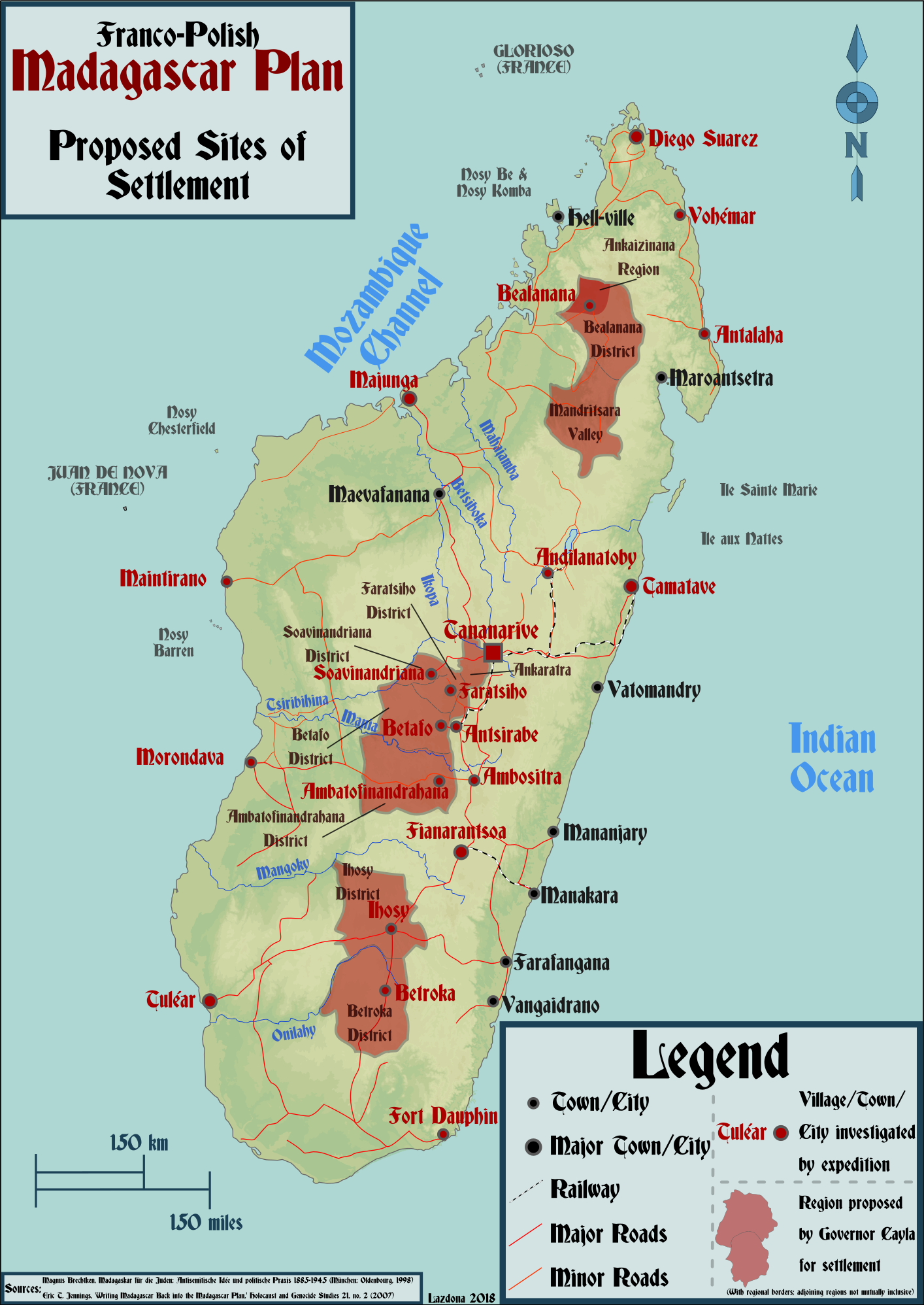
Proposed sites under the 1937 French/Polish version of the plan

In the late nineteenth century and early twentieth century, there were a number of resettlement plans for European Jews that were precursors to the Madagascar Plan. Paul de Lagarde, an antisemitic Orientalist scholar, first suggested evacuating the European Jews to Madagascar in his 1878 work Deutsche Schriften ('German writings'). Members of the Zionist movement in 1904–1905 seriously debated the Uganda Scheme, by which Russian Jews, who were in immediate danger from ongoing pogroms in the Russian Empire, would be settled in the East Africa Protectorate (now Kenya), which was part of the British Empire at the time. The plan was later rejected as unworkable by the World Zionist Congress.

Adherents of territorialism split off from the main Zionist movement and continued to search for a location where Jews might settle and create a state, or at least an autonomous area. The idea of Jewish resettlement in Madagascar was promoted by British antisemites Henry Hamilton Beamish (founder of the British antisemitic society The Britons), Arnold Leese (founder of the Imperial Fascist League), and others. With the cooperation of the French, the Polish government commissioned a task force in 1937 to examine the possibility of settling Polish Jews on the island. The head of the commission, Mieczysław Lepecki, felt the island could accommodate 5,000 to 7,000 families, but Jewish members of the group estimated that, because of the climate and poor infrastructure, only 500 or even fewer families could safely be accommodated.

Historian Eric T. Jennings has argued that the plan's persistence – from its earliest public proposals to its explorations by the French, Polish, and German governments during World War II – stems from the "Jewish thesis" discourse regarding Madagascar's supposed ancient Jewish roots. In 1937, Bealanana and Ankaizinana, two very remote areas with high elevations and low population densities, were identified by a French delegation of three men, two of whom were Jews, as a possible site for Jewish relocation.

== In Nazi Germany ==
Racism and antisemitism were basic tenets of the Nazi Party and the Nazi government. Discrimination and violent attacks against Jews began immediately after the seizure of power in 1933. Violence and economic pressure were used by the Nazis to encourage Jews to voluntarily leave the country. By 1939, around 250,000 of Germany's 437,000 Jews had emigrated to the United States, Argentina, the United Kingdom, and other countries, as well as the British Mandate of Palestine.

The Nazi leadership seized on the idea of deporting the remaining German Jews overseas. Barren, unproductive lands were viewed as appropriate destinations as this would prevent the deportees from flourishing in their new location. In his May 1940 memorandum to Hitler, Concerning the Treatment of the Alien Population in the East, Reichsführer-SS Heinrich Himmler declared that he hoped to see "the term 'Jew' [...] completely eliminated through the massive immigration of all Jews to Africa or some other colony".

=== Planning begins ===
Initial discussions began to take place in 1938 among Nazi ideologues such as Julius Streicher, Hermann Göring, Alfred Rosenberg, and Joachim von Ribbentrop. Ten per cent of Jews under German jurisdiction by that date were Polish nationals. Józef Lipski, the Polish ambassador to Germany, expressed his country's reluctance to take them back, and the Polish government decreed that Polish passport holders would not be permitted to return except under specific conditions. When Ribbentrop raised the matter with French foreign minister Georges Bonnet in December of that year, Bonnet expressed French reluctance to receive more German Jews and inquired if measures could be taken to prevent their arrival. France itself was contemplating how to deport some 10,000 Jews and considered whether Madagascar might be an appropriate destination.

Planning for German deportations to Madagascar formally began in 1940. Franz Rademacher, recently appointed as the head of the Jewish Department of the Ministry of Foreign Affairs, forwarded on 3 June to his superior, the diplomat Martin Luther, a memorandum on the fate of the Jews. Rademacher said: "The desirable solution is: all Jews out of Europe". He briefly considered Palestine as a destination, but deemed it unsuitable, as he considered it undesirable that a strong Jewish state should be created in the Middle East. In addition, Palestine was under British control at the time. Rademacher recommended that the French colony of Madagascar should be made available as a destination for the Jews of Europe as one of the terms of the surrender of France, which the Germans had invaded on 10 May 1940. The resettled Jews, noted Rademacher, could be used as hostages to ensure "future good behaviour of their racial comrades in America". The plan was developed by Referat D III of the Abteilung Deutschland ('section Germany').

Luther broached the subject with Foreign Minister Ribbentrop, who was simultaneously developing a similar scheme. By 18 June, Hitler and Ribbentrop spoke of the plan with Italian leader Benito Mussolini as a possibility that could be pursued after the defeat of France. Once he learned of the plan, SS-Obergruppenführer Reinhard Heydrich, the chief of the Reich Security Main Office (RSHA), insisted that Ribbentrop relinquish any future responsibility for the plan to that office. As Heydrich had been appointed by Göring in January 1939 to oversee Jewish evacuation from German-occupied territory, the Jewish question was hence under his purview.

Adolf Eichmann, the head of the RSHA Sub-Department IV-B4, which dealt with Jewish affairs and evacuation, soon became involved. On 15 August, he released a memorandum titled Reichssicherheitshauptamt: Madagaskar Projekt ('Reich security main office: Madagascar project'), calling for the resettlement of a million Jews per year for four years and abandoning the idea of retaining any Jews in Europe. The RSHA, he emphasised, would control all aspects of the program. While Rademacher called for the colony to be under German control but self-governing under Jewish administration, Eichmann made it plain that he intended for the SS to control and oversee every aspect of life on the island, which they would govern as a police state.

Most Nazi bureaus, including the Foreign Office, the Security Police, and the General Government (the occupied portion of Poland) pinned their hopes on the plan as the last chance to "solve the Jewish problem" through emigration. In particular, Hans Frank, governor of the General Government, viewed the forced resettlement to Madagascar as being preferable to the heretofore piecemeal efforts at deportation into Poland. As of 10 July, deportations into Poland were cancelled, and construction of the Warsaw Ghetto was halted, since it appeared to be unnecessary.

=== Planning continues ===
Rademacher envisioned the founding of a European bank that would ultimately liquidate all European Jewish assets to pay for the plan. This bank would then play an intermediary role between Madagascar and the rest of the world, as Jews would not be allowed to interact financially with outsiders. Göring's office of the Four Year Plan would oversee the administration of the plan's economics.

Additionally, Rademacher foresaw roles for other government agencies. Ribbentrop's Foreign Affairs Ministry would negotiate terms with the French for the handover of Madagascar to Germany. It would also play a part in crafting other treaties to deal with Europe's Jews. Its Information Department, along with Joseph Goebbels and his Ministry of Public Enlightenment and Propaganda, would control the flow of information at home and abroad. Viktor Brack, a division chief in the Chancellery of the Führer, would oversee transportation. The SS would undertake the expulsion of the Jews from Europe and govern the island as a police state. The Nazis expected that after the invasion of the United Kingdom in Operation Sea Lion that they would commandeer the British merchant fleet to transport the Jews to Madagascar. The Nazis expected many deportees to perish in the harsh conditions or die at the hands of the SS. The plan has been characterised by the historian Ian Kershaw as genocide by an alternative method.

=== Plan abandoned ===
With the failure to defeat the Royal Air Force in the Battle of Britain, the proposed invasion of the UK was postponed indefinitely on 17 September 1940. This meant the British merchant fleet would not be at Germany's disposal for use in evacuations, and planning for the Madagascar proposal stalled. In late August 1940, Rademacher entreated Ribbentrop to hold a meeting at his ministry to begin drawing up a panel of experts to consolidate the plan. Ribbentrop never responded. Likewise, Eichmann's memorandum languished with Heydrich, who never approved it. Establishment of ghettos in Warsaw and other cities in Poland resumed in August 1940.

Further complicating matters, the RSHA had estimated it would take some four years to transport all the Jews to Africa's east coast, making it further impracticable. The plan was officially shelved within the Foreign Office in February 1942. British forces took the island from Vichy France in the Battle of Madagascar in November 1942 and control was transferred to the Free French.

Britain's refusal to surrender, the failure to implement Operation Sealion, and Germany's lack of naval control made the Madagascar Plan unfeasible. With removal no longer viable, the Nazi regime turned to harsher internal measures, driven more by wartime realities than ideological ones. New opportunities in the East led Hitler to abandon the plan in favour of deportation to occupied territories.

Once planning for Operation Barbarossa commenced, Hitler asked Himmler to draft a new plan for the elimination of the Jews of Europe, and Himmler passed along the task to Heydrich. His draft proposed the deportation of the Jews to the Soviet Union via Poland. The later Generalplan Ost ('general plan for the East'), prepared by Konrad Meyer and others, called for deporting the entire population of occupied Eastern Europe and the Soviet Union to Siberia, either for use as slave labour or to be murdered after the Soviet defeat. The plan hinged on the rapid defeat of the Soviet forces.

Once it became apparent that the war against the Soviet Union would drag on much longer than expected, Heydrich revised his plans to concentrate on the Jewish population then under Nazi control. Since transporting masses of people into a combat zone would be impossible, Heydrich decided that the Jews would be killed in extermination camps set up in occupied areas of Poland – the Final Solution. Estimates of the total number of Jews murdered during the resulting Holocaust range from 5.5 to 6 million people.

== See also ==
- Germany–Madagascar relations
- Jewish Autonomous Oblast
- Nisko Plan
- Pale of Settlement
- Proposals for a Jewish state
