= Stanley Weiser =

American screenwriter

- Born: New York City, New York, United States
- Education: NYU Film School
- Occupation: Screenwriter

Stanley Weiser is an American screenwriter.

== Biography ==
He was born in New York City. His screen credits include Wall Street and W., both directed by Oliver Stone. He also wrote the 20th Century Fox film, Project X. He is credited for creating characters in the sequel to Wall Street: Wall Street: Money Never Sleeps.

He wrote the screenplay for Project X with Matthew Broderick in 1987. Weiser was Oliver Stone's screenwriting partner on the movie Wall Street, released in 1987 and a cult classic. He also helped Stone write the film W in 2008, about the life of US President George Bush. The dialogue was positively received by Roger Ebert for not containing overtly "revisionist history."

Weiser's other projects include two civil rights dramas, developed as feature films, but made for television. Murder in Mississippi, a chronicle of the 1964 Freedom Summer movement and the lives and deaths of Cheney, Schwerner, and Goodman, the three young civil rights workers who were killed by the Ku Klux Klan, which aired on NBC in 1990. Freedom Song, a semi-fictional account of the early SNCC movement in Mississippi, was co-written with Phil Alden Robinson, who also directed.

Weiser also adapted the novel, Fatherland, by Robert Harris, for HBO. He wrote the NBC four-hour mini-series Witness to the Mob in 1998, which was produced by Robert De Niro.

In 2013, it was reported he'd optioned the novel Three Graves Full and intended to write the script.

== Personal life ==
He is married and lives in Santa Monica, California. He is a founding member of the West Los Angeles Shambhala Buddhist Meditation Center.

== Filmography ==
- Street Scenes 1970 (1970)
- Coast to Coast (1980)
- Project X (1987)
- Wall Street (1987)
- Murder in Mississippi (1990)
- Fatherland (1994)
- Witness to the Mob (1998)
- Freedom Song (2000)
- Rudy: The Rudy Giuliani Story (2003)
- W. (2008)
