= D.I.G. =

D.I.G. may refer to:

- Deputy Inspector General, a high ranking senior police officer in several countries
- Dinosaur Interplanetary Gazette, founded July 4, 1996, was a pioneering online science magazine
- Directions In Groove, Australian acid jazz band
