= Street Scenes 1970 =

1970 film directed by Martin Scorsese

- Directed by: New York Cinetracts Collective; Martin Scorsese (uncredited)
- Starring: Martin Scorsese; Harvey Keitel; Verna Bloom; Jay Cocks; William Kunstler
- Cinematography: John Butman; Frederick Elmes; Bill Etra; Oliver Stone; Edward Summer; Stanley Weiser; (and others)
- Edited by: Thelma Schoonmaker; Martin Scorsese; (and others)
- Release date: 1970
- Running time: 75 minutes
- Country: United States
- Language: English

Street Scenes 1970 is an American documentary film made by the New York Cinetracts Collective, most notable for its involvement of filmmaker Martin Scorsese, while working as a film instructor at New York University, who served as production supervisor and post-production director on the film.

== Synopsis ==
It documents two protest rallies against the Vietnam War that took place in May 1970: the Hard Hat Riot on Wall Street in New York City and Kent State/Cambodia Incursion Protest in Washington, D.C. The numerous camera operators do impromptu interviews with the protesters and the spectators. The New York protest turns violent as protesters were attacked by construction workers who supported the war. The Washington protest is peaceful. At the end, Scorsese, Harvey Keitel, Jay Cocks and Verna Bloom discuss the events and the current state of world affairs. Oliver Stone was one of the many camera operators.

== Production ==
Nancy Bennett (as Yorgos Arvanitis), Harry Peck Bolles, John Butman, Dick Catron, Frederick Elmes, Bill Etra, Tom Famighetti, Peter Flynn, Robert Foresta, David Freeberg, Tiger Graham, Fred Hadley, Tony Janetti, Arnold Klein, Don Lenzer, Ron Levitas, Didier Loiseau, David Ludwig, Bob Pitts, Laura Primakoff, Peter Rea, Danny Schneider, Gordon Stein, Oliver Stone, Edward Summer, Bruce Tabor, Nat Tripp, Stanley Weiser, and Bob Zahn participated in filming Street Scenes as cinematographers. Angela Kirby, Maggie Koven, Gerry Pallor, Peter Rea, Thelma Schoonmaker, and Larry Tisdall participated in filming Street Scenes as film editors.

Martin Scorsese does some interviews with protestors in the film.

"Marty Scorsese, who was our teacher, he was an advisor. We respected him. And he was helpful. And so we called ourselves the Cinetracts Collective....The whole idea was that it was the information arm of the revolution on the East Coast. So we would produce these films and send them down to Florida or North Carolina or wherever and we were going to distribute them." - Harry Peck Bolles

Martin Scorsese edited throughout the night over a period of ten days, attempting a formal structure. Scorsese would not make it a political film if he could not direct it from one end to the other. When Scorsese showed the film to the New York Cinetracts Collective participants, they hated it and felt betrayed, as it was not provocative enough. They felt betrayed, they didn’t recognize the experience that they had filmed. Scorsese emphasized sadness, anger, frustration, irresponsibility, and powerlessness. Street Scenes didn’t show radicals, but average students from families, and weekend leftists. Scorsese ended the film pessimistically, in the middle of a sentence, with a fade-out. Each time that Scorsese showed the film, the spectators, even non-engaged students, spontaneously "pursued the debate in the room, the arguments of the discussion in Washington".

== Release ==
On 14 September 1970, Street Scenes was shown at the New York Film Festival.

On 25 October 1976, Street Scenes had one showing by The Ann Arbor Film Cooperative in the Modern Languages Building on the University of Michigan campus in Ann Arbor, Michigan.

A print, in the collection of Museum of Modern Art in New York City, is not available for viewing. A VHS rip on YouTube with sub-800 views was removed at Martin Scorsese's request.

== Reception ==
"...neither accurately records the events of that week when being documentary, nor projects an organizing point of view when using cinema verite. Street Scenes might not have been so chaotic and ultimately amateurish if the cameraman and audio man had not been such belligerent proponents of the demonstrators and if the film had been edited more coherently" - National Catholic Reporter, Volume 6, Number 42, 2 October 1970

== New York Cinetracts Collective ==
In spring 1970, New York Cinetracts Collective was formed at the New York University film school, during the students' strike.

New York Cinetracts Collective associated people included: Martin Scorsese, Harvey Keitel, Verna Bloom, Frederick Elmes, and Oliver Stone. They participated in filming the Hard Hat Riot on Wall Street in New York City. Street Scenes was later disowned by Martin Scorsese.

== See also ==
- List of American films of 1970
