= W. (film) =

2008 film by Oliver Stone

- Theatrical release poster
- Directed by: Oliver Stone
- Written by: Stanley Weiser
- Produced by: Bill Block; Eric Kopeloff; Paul Hanson; Moritz Borman
- Starring: Josh Brolin; Elizabeth Banks; Ellen Burstyn; James Cromwell; Richard Dreyfuss; Scott Glenn; Toby Jones; Stacy Keach; Bruce McGill; Thandiwe Newton (Note: Credited as "Thandie Newton".); Jeffrey Wright
- Cinematography: Phedon Papamichael Jr.
- Edited by: Julie Monroe; Joe Hutshing; Alexis Chavez
- Music by: Paul Cantelon
- Production companies: Global Entertainment Group; QED International; Emperor Motion Pictures; Millbrook Pictures; Onda Entertainment
- Distributed by: Lionsgate
- Release dates: October 16, 2008 (Austin Film Festival); October 17, 2008 (United States)
- Running time: 129 minutes
- Country: United States
- Language: English
- Budget: $25.1 million
- Box office: $28.5 million

W. is a 2008 American biographical comedy-drama film based on the life of George W. Bush. Directed by Oliver Stone and written by Stanley Weiser, it stars Josh Brolin as Bush. The supporting cast includes Elizabeth Banks, James Cromwell, Ellen Burstyn, Thandiwe Newton, Jeffrey Wright, Scott Glenn, and Richard Dreyfuss. Filming began on May 12, 2008, in Louisiana, and the film was released on October 17, 2008 by Lionsgate.

== Plot ==
In 1966, George W. Bush endures an initiation by his fellow Yale University students as a Delta Kappa Epsilon pledge. During the hazing, Bush successfully recalls the names and nicknames of many of the fraternity members, and states that his family's political legacy is one in which he has no interest. After Bush is jailed in New Jersey for rowdiness following a football game, his father, George H. W. Bush states that he will help him, but for the last time. Following his graduation from Yale, Bush takes a job at an oil patch back in Texas, but he quits after a few weeks.

In 1971, "Junior" reveals his real aspirations in a father-son talk: working in professional baseball. Bush is accepted into Harvard Business School with the help of his father. After a night of heavy drinking, Bush crashes his car into his family estate and challenges his father to a fistfight. His younger brother, Jeb, stops the fight.

In 1977, Bush announces he will run for Congress to represent Texas's 19th district. At a barbecue, Bush meets his future wife, Laura Lane Welch. During a debate, Bush is criticized by his Democratic opponent, Kent Hance, who says that Bush is not a real Texan and has spent campaign contributions to throw an alcohol-fueled party for underage Texas Tech University students. Bush fares poorly in the debate and loses the election, but nevertheless receives the highest number of votes for a Republican candidate in Texas's 19th district in the state's history.

In 1986, Bush becomes a born-again Christian, gives up alcohol, and mends his relationship with his father. The elder Bush invites him to assist with what becomes his 1988 presidential campaign, although Bush himself suspects that he only was asked because Jeb was busy. Bush's political advisor, Karl Rove, tells him that he has the potential to make a name for himself, but that he has not yet done anything with his life. Bush becomes a front office executive of the Texas Rangers baseball team, while his father oversees the victory of the Gulf War. Although Allied forces liberate Kuwait within 100 hours of their ground invasion, the elder Bush decides not to invade Iraq to depose Saddam Hussein. After his father loses the 1992 presidential election to Bill Clinton, Bush blames the loss on his decision not to depose Saddam.

In 1994, Bush runs for governor of Texas. Despite his parents' objection to him entering the race, he secures a victory in the election, becoming the 46th governor of Texas on January 17, 1995. In 2000, he makes a successful bid to become president. Following the September 11 attacks in 2001, Bush labels Iran, Iraq, and North Korea as the "axis of evil". In 2002, Bush searches for evidence that Saddam was creating nuclear weapons, and has the army prepared. All of Bush's White House staff supports him except Secretary of State Colin Powell, who states that invading Iraq would destabilize the country. Powell is generally overruled by Vice President Dick Cheney and Secretary of Defense Donald Rumsfeld, who insist that the war would secure the United States' status as sole global superpower while spreading democracy throughout the Middle East.

In March 2003, the U.S. invades Iraq. The war appears to be a success, and Bush soon gives his "Mission Accomplished" speech on an aircraft carrier. Shortly afterward the Iraqi insurgency begins and when it becomes clear that there are no weapons of mass destruction within Iraq, Bush learns that the responsibility for finding them had been relegated far down the chain of command. Bush discovers that Saddam gambled his regime and his life on the assumption that Bush was bluffing. Bush is asked in a White House press conference what mistakes he made as President, a question that leaves him flustered and speechless. That night, Bush has a nightmare in which his father accuses him of ruining his family's legacy, which the elder Bush claims was intended for Jeb. Bush dreams of himself playing center field at a baseball game. Bush attempts to catch a pop fly, but it disappears.

== Cast ==
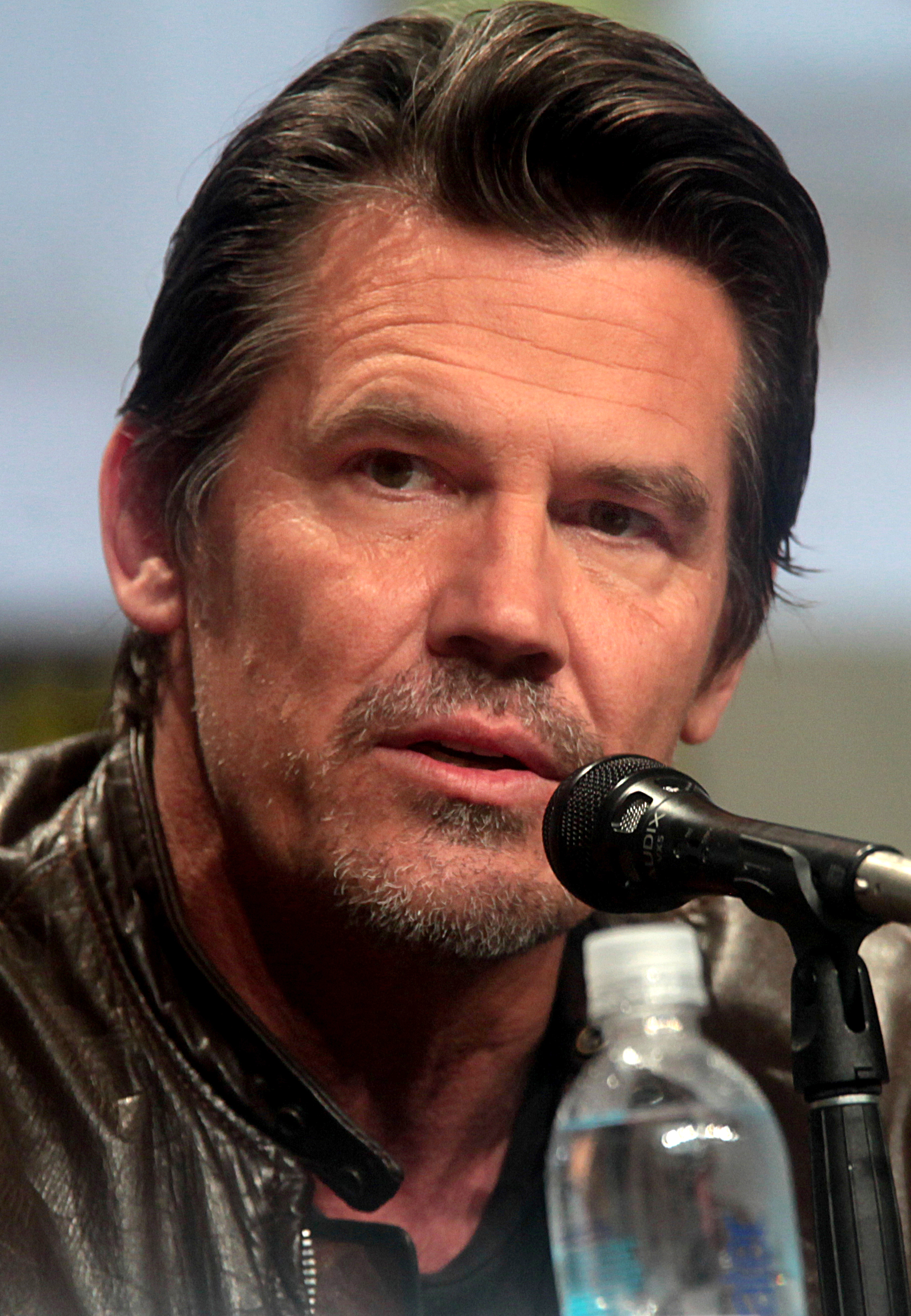
Josh Brolin (left) plays President George W. Bush
- Josh Brolin as George W. Bush. Stone's original idea for the main role was to propose it to Harrison Ford, whom he said had "a pretty similar face as of George Bush". Stone then cast Christian Bale, who spent months researching for the role, but dropped out after he was not satisfied with the prosthetic makeup tests. Stone remarked, "Christian's a very methodical actor and he has to have the makeup thing work for him." (Bale later went on to portray Dick Cheney in 2018's similarly themed Vice, earning an Academy Award for Best Actor nomination for his performance.) Brolin, cast at the "last minute", spent months working on Bush's distinctive vocal style, calling hotels in Texas and talking to the people at the front desk, listening to their accents. The actor also watched videos of Bush walking. Brolin said, "It changes over the years, how he walks in his 30s, how he walks in foreign lands, before 9/11 and afterward. People hold their emotions in their bodies. They can't fake it. Especially him."
- Elizabeth Banks as Laura Bush, Bush's wife and former first lady of the United States. Banks said she would not do an impression of the first lady. "I just want to honor her voice, her stillness, and her hairstyle".
- James Cromwell as George H. W. Bush, Bush's father and the 41st president of the United States.
- Ellen Burstyn as Barbara Bush, Bush's mother and first lady of the United States during the senior Bush's presidential term.
- Richard Dreyfuss as Dick Cheney, Bush's vice president. Stone was interested in Robert Duvall as Cheney, but Duvall turned down the role. Dreyfuss and Stone did not get along well during filming, and Dreyfuss was harshly critical of the director during the film's press junket, noting Stone had attacked him right before the tour began. Dreyfuss also told film critic Nathan Rabin in an interview that he did empathize with the former Vice President, calling him "true to himself", and saying that the real villain of W. was the American public, because it never responded with outrage to the Bush Administration's actions.
- Jeffrey Wright as U.S. Secretary of State Gen. Colin Powell.
- Scott Glenn as U.S. Secretary of Defense Donald Rumsfeld.
- Thandiwe Newton (credited as Thandie Newton) as U.S. National Security Advisor Condoleezza Rice.
- Toby Jones as Deputy White House Chief of Staff Karl Rove.
- Bruce McGill as Central Intelligence Agency Director George Tenet.
- Ioan Gruffudd as British Prime Minister Tony Blair. Much of Gruffudd's intended scene was cut. The scene depicted Blair revealing his intentions to convert to Catholicism, and his desire to give the United Nations and British and American allies more time and greater involvement before the Iraq invasion.
- Noah Wyle as U.S. Secretary of Commerce Donald Evans.
- Rob Corddry as White House Press Secretary Ari Fleischer.
- Dennis Boutsikaris as U.S. Deputy Secretary of Defense Paul Wolfowitz.
- Randall Newsome as Paul Bremer, head of the Coalition Provisional Authority.
- Jason Ritter as Jeb Bush.
- Michael Gaston as General Tommy Franks.
- Tom Kemp as David Kay.
- Paul Rae as Congressman Kent Hance.
- Stacy Keach as Earle Hudd, Bush's pastor and spiritual advisor. Hudd is a composite of several religious figures influential in Bush's life, including Billy Graham, James Robison, C. Lane Boyd, Kirbyjon Caldwell, Mark Craig, Tony Evans, T. D. Jakes, and Dr. Ed Young.
- Jesse Bradford as Thatcher, Bush's college buddy.
- Marley Shelton as Fran, one of Bush's girlfriends.
- Anne Pressly as Anchorwoman.
- Sayed Badreya as Saddam Hussein, President of Iraq.
- William Chan as Hospital Doctor.
- Teresa Cheung as Miss China.
- Colin Hanks as David Frum.
- Bryan Massey as Skeeter.
- Brent Sexton as Joe O'Neill.
- Charles Fathy as the voice of Jacques Chirac.

== Production ==
I want a fair, true portrait of the man. How did Bush go from an alcoholic bum to the most powerful figure in the world? It's like Frank Capra territory on one hand, but I'll also cover the demons in his private life, his bouts with his dad and his conversion to Christianity, which explains a lot of where he is coming from. It includes his belief that God personally chose him to be President of the United States, and his coming into his own with the stunning, preemptive attack on Iraq. It will contain surprises for Bush supporters and his detractors.

— Oliver Stone

W. was Oliver Stone's third film in a trilogy he made about the presidency, set in the time from the 1960s to today: the set began with JFK and continued with Nixon. Originally, he was attached to direct Pinkville, a film about the Army's investigation of the My Lai Massacre, but development was canceled due to the 2007–2008 Writers Guild of America strike and actor Bruce Willis pulling out of the film three weeks before shooting was set to start. As a result, United Artists shut the production down. Stone moved on to direct a film about the life of George W. Bush, shopping a script that had been written before the strike by Stanley Weiser, who had co-written Wall Street with Stone. Weiser and Stone read 17 books as part of their research for the script, and worked on the project for a year before venturing to film Pinkville.

Stone has admitted that he and Weiser had to speculate on some dialogue: "You take all the facts and take the spirit of the scene and make it accurate to what you think happened". W. was financed independently for Stone, with Hong Kong, German, and Australian funds: he tried to approach American studios for money, but got turned down. Lions Gate Entertainment distributed the film. Although Stone has criticized Bush for the 2003 invasion of Iraq, the director said that he was not looking to make an "anti-Bush polemic". Stone compared his goal of the film to that of The Queen, wanting to trace "seminal events in Bush's life." According to the director, "It's a behind-the-scenes approach, similar to Nixon, to give a sense of what it's like to be in his skin. But if Nixon was a symphony, this is more like a chamber piece, and not as dark in tone." He described the structure of W. as a three-act film starting with Bush as a young man "with a missed life", followed by his transformation and "an assertion of will which was amazingly powerful" as he came out from his father's shadow, and finally his invasion of Iraq.

The film, originally titled Bush, was re-titled W. to draw distinction between him and his father. Filming began on May 12, 2008, in Shreveport, Louisiana, and completed filming on July 11, 2008. On May 13, 2008, the New York Post published excerpts from an early draft of the script. The column, written by Cindy Adams, stated "Pro-Bushies will hate it, antis will love it." The film was released on October 17, 2008, timed just before that year's presidential election. W.'s producers reportedly ran television spots for the film opposite Republican Party presidential nominee John McCain's ads in the fall of 2008.

== Reception ==
=== Critical response ===
On Rotten Tomatoes, the film has an approval rating of 58% based on 222 reviews, with an average rating of 6.01/10. The website's critical consensus reads, "A surprisingly sympathetic portrayal of the 43rd American president, W. is fascinating in spots, but merely rudimentary as a whole." At Metacritic, the film has an average weighted score of 56 out of 100, based on reviews from 36 critics, indicating "mixed or average reviews".

In his review, Roger Ebert wrote that it was "fascinating" and praised all the actors, noting that Richard Dreyfuss was "not so much a double as an embodiment" of Dick Cheney. In contrast, Ann Hornaday of The Washington Post called the film "a rushed, wildly uneven, tonally jumbled caricature." Film critic James Berardinelli negatively compared the film with Saturday Night Live skits, saying of the actors that "None of them are as dead-on as Tina Fey as Sarah Palin."

The Bush administration never officially commented on the film. Former Florida Governor Jeb Bush, who is portrayed in the film, called the sibling rivalry portrayed in the film "high-grade, unadulterated hooey" and said that Stone's exploration of the family dynamic could have benefited from actual conversations with the Bush family. Slate magazine's Timothy Noah, however, noted that "most [of] the film's more ludicrous details" are actually directly taken from non-fiction sources, and argued that the film was too kind to Bush in omitting certain reported events, including an allegation that Bush mocked murderer Karla Faye Tucker, a woman executed during his tenure as governor of Texas. In a March 2010 "Screen Test" interview with The New York Times' Lynne Hirschberg, Josh Brolin claims Bush did in fact watch the film. Brolin said Oliver Stone met with Bill Clinton in China and Clinton told Stone he'd lent his copy of W. to Bush. Reportedly, Bush himself "liked it very much" and "thought there were sad moments."

The film appeared on some critics' top ten lists of the best films of 2008. Joe Neumaier of the New York Daily News named it the eighth best film of 2008, and Roger Ebert of the Chicago Sun-Times named it on his top 20 list (he did not assign rankings).

=== Box office ===
The film opened No. 4 behind The Secret Life of Bees, Beverly Hills Chihuahua, and Max Payne, respectively, with $10,505,668 from 2,030 theaters, with a $5,175 average. The film had a budget of $25.1 million and grossed $25.5 million in North America, and $3.4 million internationally.
