= Where Have All the People Gone? =

- Genre: Science fiction
- Written by: Lewis John Carlino; Sandor Stern
- Directed by: John Llewellyn Moxey
- Starring: Peter Graves
- Music by: Robert Prince
- Country of origin: United States
- Original language: English

Production
- Executive producer: Charles W. Fries
- Producer: Gerald I. Isenberg
- Production locations: Agoura, California; Malibu Canyon Road, Santa Monica Mountains, California; Los Angeles; Malibu, California
- Cinematography: Michael D. Margulies
- Editor: John A. Martinelli
- Running time: 74 minutes
- Production companies: The Jozak Company; Alpine Productions Inc. Metromedia Producers Corporation

Original release
- Network: NBC
- Release: October 8, 1974

Where Have All the People Gone? is a 1974 American made-for-television science fiction drama film starring Peter Graves, Kathleen Quinlan, George O'Hanlon, Jr. and Verna Bloom.

== Plot ==
On a camping trip in the Sierra Nevada mountains in central California, Steven Anders and his two teenage children, Deborah and David, are exploring a cave when they experience an earthquake. After emerging, they hear from a ranch-hand who was outside that there was a bright solar flash prior to the earthquake. He soon falls ill and dies, whereupon his body turns to a powdery substance. As the family comes down from the mountain to the nearest town, they discover that everyone has turned to the powdery substance inside their clothing, there are few survivors and that the solar flare also caused motor vehicles to become immobilized which then have to be repaired.

Owing to fear and anxiety, most people they find are focused only on their own survival, but as the family tries to make their way home 300 miles to Malibu, where the mother had returned earlier from the camping trip, they find two people that need their help, as well as a man who invites them to be neighbors.

They face dangers ranging from wild dogs, who seem to have been driven mad from the solar flare, to a gunman who steals their car and a second solar flare. They rescue a woman, Jenny, and later a young boy whose family was killed by two men who stole their car. Apart from the physical journey, they struggle to overcome the emotional trauma of the events.

They find their way home and discover a note left for them by the mother, who has also died and turned to powder. She wrote in her final letter just before dying that a virus outbreak that began after the solar flare is responsible for most of the deaths, and that some people — just one in every thousand — have a genetic resistance. Despairing, Jenny tries to commit suicide by drowning herself in the ocean, but she is rescued. At the conclusion, they exude a hopeful outlook by embarking on a trek to northern California in search of other survivors.

== Cast ==
- Peter Graves as Steven Anders
- Verna Bloom as Jenny
- Kathleen Quinlan as Deborah Anders
- George O'Hanlon, Jr. as David Anders
- Michael-James Wixted as Michael
- Noble Willingham as Jim Clancy
- Jay W. MacIntosh as Barbara Anders

== Production ==
The film was made for NBC and directed by John Llewellyn Moxey, and was filmed in the Sierra Nevada foothills, Malibu, California, and Agoura, California. The teleplay was written by Lewis John Carlino and Sandor Stern, from a story by Carlino. Starlog cited the movie as an intended TV pilot that was not picked up that was "better than many shows that ended up being made".

== Reception ==
The website Moria found that, while the movie was open-ended, it managed to avoid the usual post-apocalyptic clichés. It also liked the mystery the movie presented and enjoyed the resolution, although its scientific validity was questionable. It noted the movie could have served as a pilot for an on-going TV series. The Encyclopedia of Science Fiction found the movie to be routine, with competent direction, and a few interesting twists. Apocalypse Movies liked it, calling it a rare TV movie to address post-apocalypse issues.

== Other Countries ==
When the film was dubbed into the Spanish language, it was re-titled as "Supervivientes" (Survivors).

== Home media ==
The film was released on region 1 DVD in 2011. As of June 2020, it was available to stream on YouTube
