= Verna Bloom =

American actress (1938–2019)

- Born: Verna Frances Bloom; August 7, 1938; Lynn, Massachusetts, U.S.
- Died: January 9, 2019 (aged 80); Bar Harbor, Maine, U.S.
- Occupation: Actress
- Years active: 1967–2003
- Spouse(s): Richard Collier (divorced) Jay Cocks (m. 1972)

Verna Frances Bloom (August 7, 1938 – January 9, 2019) was an American actress. She is noted for roles in the films Medium Cool (1969), High Plains Drifter (1973) and Animal House (1978).

== Early life and education ==
Verna Frances Bloom, born on August 7, 1938, in Lynn, Massachusetts, grew up in a Russian Jewish family where her father, Milton, operated a grocery store. Her mother, Sara (Damsky) Bloom, initially focused on managing their household. After Milton and Sara divorced, Sara took charge of the family grocery business and later transitioned to bookkeeping for a trucking company. She attended the School of Fine Arts at Boston University, graduating with a Bachelor of Fine Arts in 1959. She also studied at the Herbert Berghof Studio for actors in New York City.

== Career ==
On Broadway, Bloom portrayed Charlotte Corday in The Persecution and Assassination of Jean-Paul Marat as Performed by the Inmates of the Asylum of Charenton Under the Direction of the Marquis de Sade (1967) and Blanche Morton in Brighton Beach Memoirs (1983). She made her film debut in Medium Cool, and then co-starred in Clint Eastwood's 1973 film, High Plains Drifter and in the 1974 made-for-TV movie Where Have All The People Gone? with Peter Graves and Kathleen Quinlan. Bloom also had roles in more than 30 films and television episodes beginning in the 1960s, including playing Mary, mother of Jesus, in The Last Temptation of Christ in 1988 and Marion Wormer in Animal House in 1978.

== Personal life and death ==
Bloom married Richard Collier, but they separated by 1969. They began the Trident Theater in Denver Colorado, which operated from 1963 to 1965. In 1972 she married film critic Jay Cocks. They had a son, Sam, born in 1981. The couple remained married until her death.

Bloom died aged 80 on January 9, 2019, in Bar Harbor, Maine, from complications of dementia.

== Filmography ==
=== Film ===
Verna Bloom film credits
Year	Title	Role	Notes
1969	Medium Cool	Eileen	
1969	Children's Games	The Girl	
1970	Street Scenes 1970	Herself	
1971	The Hired Hand	Hannah Collings	
1973	High Plains Drifter	Sarah Belding	
1973	Badge 373	Maureen	
1978	National Lampoon's Animal House	Marion Wormer	
1982	Honkytonk Man	Emmy	
1985	The Journey of Natty Gann	Farm Woman	
1985	After Hours	June	
1988	The Last Temptation of Christ	Mary, Mother of Jesus	
2003	Where Are They Now?: A Delta Alumni Update	Marion Wormer	Short film, (final film role)

=== Television ===
Verna Bloom television credits
Year	Title	Role	Notes
1967	N.Y.P.D.	Barbara Laney	Episode: "The Screaming Woman" (S1.E3)
1969	Bonanza	Ellen Masters	Episode: "The Fence" (S10.E29)
1969	The David Frost Show	Herself	1 episode
1972	Particular Men	Evelyn	TV movie
1973	Doc Elliot	Mary Beth Hickey	Episode: "Pilot" (S1.E1)
1973	Police Story	Elizabeth Shaner	Episode: "The Ten Year Honeymoon" (S1.E3)
1974	Where Have All the People Gone?	Jenny	TV movie
1975	The Blue Knight	Moody Larkin	Episode: "Pilot" (S1.E1)
1975	Sarah T. – Portrait of a Teenage Alcoholic	Jean Hodges	TV movie
1976	Police Story	Marge Connor	Episode: "Payment Deferred" (S4.E1)
1976	Kojak	Carrie Zachary	Episode: "On the Edge" (S3.E16)
1977	Visions	Nancy Doucette	Episode: "The Dancing Bear" (S2.E4)
1977	Lou Grant	Emily	Episode: "Christmas" (S1.E13)
1977	Gibbsville	Unknown	Episode: "A Case History" (S1.E10)
1977	Contract on Cherry Street	Emily Hovannes	TV movie
1980	Playing for Time	Paulette	TV movie
1981	Rivkin: Bounty Hunter	Bertha	TV movie
1985	Promises to Keep	Unknown (uncredited)	TV movie
1987	Cagney & Lacey	Joan Torvec	Episode: "No Vacancy" (S7.E1)
1988	The Equalizer	Marian Grey	Episode: "Target of Choice" (S3.E21)
1989	The Equalizer	Ellen Kaminsky	Episode: "Race Traitors" (S4.E20)
1993	Dr. Quinn, Medicine Woman	Maude Bray	Episode: "Dr. Quinn, Medicine Woman" (S1.E0, Pilot)
2003	The West Wing	Molly Lapham	Episode: "The Long Goodbye" (S4.E13)
