= Edward Summer =

American filmmaker (1946–2014)

- Born: March 18, 1946; Buffalo, New York, U.S.
- Died: November 13, 2014 (aged 68); New York City, U.S.
- Occupations: Filmmaker; author; educator

Edward Summer (March 18, 1946 – November 13, 2014) was an American filmmaker, author, and educator. Among his better known works are the collection of Carl Barks stories Uncle Scrooge McDuck: His Life and Times, the Dinosaur Interplanetary Gazette (one of the pioneering online magazines), the first motion picture based upon Robert E. Howard's character Conan the Barbarian, the novel Teefr, and a prequel The Legend of Teddy Bear Bob. He died in New York City on November 13, 2014.

== Early life and work ==
Born in Buffalo, New York, Summer studied painting at the Albright Art Gallery (now called the Albright-Knox Art Gallery, Albright Art School, and with the noted water-color painter Sandra Chessman. He was also acquainted from childhood with another noted water-colorist, Robert Blair.

Charles Summer, his father, was an amateur photographer who owned a then uncommon Exakta single lens reflex camera. The photographer Milton Rogovin was a family friend and early on exposed him to fine-art photographs.

At age 15, Summer had a special one-man exhibit of his drawings in a group show at the Buffalo Museum of Science.

== Career ==
=== Theater ===
At the Studio Theater (now called Studio Arena Theater), Buffalo, New York, Summer appeared in Many Moons, based on a James Thurber book, choreographed by Michael Bennett, and directed by Roberta Sharpe circa 1961.

He also worked with Fred Keller and Neal Du Brock as actor and stage manager, as well as Joe Krysiak founder of Project Artaud.

=== Motion pictures ===
Encouraged by experimental filmmaker Peter Adair, Summer ultimately attended the first year of the New York University School of the Arts (then under the NYU School of Education and called the School of Television, Motion Pictures and Radio). Haig Manoogian, instrumental in starting the career of Martin Scorsese by producing the film Who's That Knocking at My Door headed the school and was one of the main instructors.

At NYU, Summer continued painting and studied with, among others, acclaimed photo-realist Audrey Flack. Harry Hurwitz, director of The Projectionist was also an instructor and personal friend.

His student film Item 72-D, The Adventures of Spa and Fon not only won multiple awards, but was shown worldwide at many film festivals. It was the first film shown at the Film Forum movie theater in New York City when the Film Forum was only a tiny loft space on West 88th Street in Manhattan. Hervé Villechaize, then unknown, was one of the stars of Item 72-D, The Adventures of Spa and Fon. Villechaize went on to fame in The Man with the Golden Gun and as a recurring character on the television series Fantasy Island. A co-writer of the film, John Byrum went on to write and direct numerous other films. Both Manoogian and Scorsese were advisors to the project.

Other early films included:

- Solstice (1968) - film editor
- High on the Wind Rivers (1970) - cinematographer, film editor
- Street Scenes (1970) - cinematographer, sound recording, film editor

As a fellow of the National Endowment for the Arts, Summer received a grant to produce a documentary about the history of American comic strip and comic book art. This unfinished film covered, among other people, Jack Kirby, Milton Caniff, Carl Barks, Chuck Jones, Ray Bradbury, Dick Huemer and Ralph Bakshi.

He worked with CBS's Camera Three on a two-part series covering the history of comic books and comic strips.

In 1975, Summer helped his friend Brian De Palma redo all of the promotional materials for Phantom of the Paradise. As a result, producer Edward R. Pressman approached Summer for other projects. The result was Conan the Barbarian which took nearly seven years to bring to the screen. The original treatment/screenplay was written by Summer with some collaboration by Roy Thomas who had written and edited the Marvel Comic Book series.

In 2003, he founded the Buffalo International Film Festival. Summer has been executive director since 2005.

=== Comic books ===
Gold Key Comics Several science fiction adaptations for Starstream. Born of the Sun. Shaka

Marvel Comics Plot Red Sonja Issue One. Red Sonya and the Unicorn. This story largely defined Red Sonja's personality and "inner nature".

Plot: The Invaders Involving the revival of the Golem to defeat the Axis.

Plot: Conan the Barbarian The Devourer of the Dead story about origin of Egyptian pyramids.

Editor: Superman the Movie Magazine, DC Comics

Summer was instrumental in beginning the process that resulted in Jerry Siegel and Joe Shuster receiving lifetime financial benefits from their creation of Superman.

=== Magazines ===
Founding editor and co-publisher: The Dinosaur Times.

Contributing writer: Written By, Time, The New York Times, Circus, Films in Review, The Perfect Vision, The Absolute Sound, Home Theater Magazine, Skeptical Inquirer, Skeptical Briefs, The Monster Times.

=== Digital Nitrate Prize ===
In 2005, Edward Summer founded The Digital Nitrate Prize in order to encourage the research necessary to properly transfer and preserve the world's motion picture heritage using the developing digital media. Based upon the X Prize, the Digital Nitrate Prize will offer a cash prize for the first individual, group or corporation which is able to exactly duplicate the look of nitrate film stock using digital transfer and digital projection.

=== Constructive Living ===
Edward Summer was a certified instructor of Constructive Living. He studied with David K. Reynolds in Los Angeles, New York, West Virginia and Tennessee.

== Filmography ==
- 1968 - Solstice - producer, editor
- 1968 - DeFeet - producer, director, cinematographer
- 1970 - Item 72-D: The Adventures of Spa and Fon - producer, director
- 1970 - Street Scenes - director/cameraman, editor
- 1970 - High in the Wind Rivers - director/cameraman
- 1980 - Starship Under - director, screenwriter - (never finished)
- 1982 - Conan the Barbarian - associate producer
- 1983 - Star Wars - marketing consultant
- 1989 - Little Nemo: Adventures in Slumberland - screenplay
- 2005 - Silent Music - producer, director (in production)
- 2005 - The Magic of Magic - producer, director (in production)
- 2006 - Clicker Clatter - producer
- 2007 - Sirens - producer
- 2007 - Calvin of Oakknoll - executive producer, consulting director (in production)
