= Fatherland (1994 film) =

1994 television film directed by Christopher Menaul

- Based on: Fatherland by Robert Harris
- Written by: Stanley Weiser; Ron Hutchinson
- Directed by: Christopher Menaul
- Starring: Rutger Hauer; Miranda Richardson; Peter Vaughan; Jean Marsh; Michael Kitchen
- Music by: Gary Chang
- Country of origin: United States
- Original language: English

Production
- Executive producer: Leo Zisman
- Producers: Frederick Muller; Ilene Kahn
- Production location: Prague, Czech Republic
- Cinematography: Peter Sova
- Editor: Tariq Anwar
- Running time: 106 minutes
- Production company: HBO Pictures
- Budget: $7 million

Original release
- Network: HBO
- Release: November 26, 1994

Fatherland is a 1994 American alternate history mystery-thriller film directed by Christopher Menaul and written by Stanley Weiser and Ron Hutchinson. Based on the 1992 novel by Robert Harris, it stars Rutger Hauer, Miranda Richardson, Peter Vaughan, Jean Marsh and Michael Kitchen. Set in 1964 in an alternative world where Nazi Germany won the Second World War, the story follows an SS police detective and an American journalist investigating a series of deaths connected to a concealed Nazi crime.

Originally developed as a theatrical feature, the film was produced for HBO and shot in Prague. Its production design combined Czech locations with matte paintings depicting an alternative Berlin based on the architectural plans of Albert Speer. Fatherland premiered on HBO on November 26, 1994, and received mixed reviews. Richardson won a Golden Globe Award for Best Supporting Actress – Series, Miniseries or Television Film, while Hauer and the film received Golden Globe nominations.

== Narrative background ==
A prologue establishes an alternative history in which the Normandy landings fail, prompting the United States to withdraw from the European theater of World War II. Nazi Germany subsequently conquers Britain and much of continental Europe, while the United States defeats Japan in the Pacific. George VI and Winston Churchill go into exile in Canada, and Edward VIII is restored to the British throne under German supervision.

By 1964, Germany remains at war with the Soviet Union, while relations with the United States are strained by a prolonged Cold War. Joseph Kennedy, elected US president in 1960, prepares to visit Berlin for a summit with Adolf Hitler as the latter approaches his 75th birthday.

== Plot synopsis ==
A week before the bilateral German−American summit, a body is discovered to be floating in a lake near Berlin by Hermann Jost, who is an SS cadet in training. SS Major and Berlin Police detective Xavier March is assigned the case and questions Jost, who admits that he saw the body being dumped by Odilo "Globus" Globočnik, an Obergruppenführer of the Gestapo and a right-hand man of the SS leader, Reinhard Heydrich. The dead man is revealed to be Josef Bühler, a retired Nazi Party official who managed the Jewish resettlement to the German territories in Eastern Europe during the Second World War. The Gestapo takes over the case for reasons of "state security", and Jost dies in an apparent training accident.

Meanwhile, Charlotte "Charlie" Maguire, a member of a visiting American press entourage, is discreetly given an envelope by an old man at her hotel. Inside it is a photograph of several high-ranking Nazi officials outside a villa. A note on the photograph leads her to Wilhelm Stuckart, another retired party official, but she finds him dead at his apartment.

March is reassigned to the Stuckart case, but when he takes Maguire to the crime scene, the Gestapo claims jurisdiction, and his superior, Arthur Nebe, warns him against further investigation. When they follow up on the photo, Maguire and March visit Wannsee to learn the identities of the men. All of them attended the Wannsee Conference and are found to have died under suspicious circumstances except one. The only survivor is Franz Luther, the old man who gave Maguire the picture.

March tells her to get out of Germany since he now realizes that there is a plot by the regime's highest levels to cover up whatever was discussed at the conference. Luther contacts Maguire and asks her to meet him on a train, where he asks her to communicate his desire for safe passage to the United States in exchange for what he knows about "the biggest secret of the war". SS troops corner Luther and kill him, but March rescues Maguire. He later blackmails a colleague to get Luther's file and learns that he had a mistress, the former stage actress Anna von Hagen.

Maguire, posing as an official of the American embassy in Berlin to process Luther's safe passage, visits Hagen and obtains Luther's papers. Hagen reveals that the supposed resettlement of Jews was a cover for their systematic murder during the war, and that the documents link the killings to officials who attended the Wannsee Conference.

March is horrified by the pictures and the documents, which prove that the events actually happened, and he agrees to join Maguire and to escape Germany with his son, Pili. However, the Gestapo has already persuaded Pili to betray March, who is lured into a trap by Globus. During his escape, March kills a Gestapo agent but is mortally wounded. He manages to reach a phone booth to call Pili for a final time and then dies.

As Kennedy arrives at Berlin's Great Hall, a member of the press entourage helps Maguire when she slips the documents to him through the US ambassador. When Kennedy looks at the materials, he abruptly cancels the scheduled meeting with Hitler and immediately flies back to the U.S.

The epilogue reveals that the narrator is a grown-up Pili, who notes that although Maguire was eventually arrested by the Gestapo, the revelation of the extermination of European Jews derailed any prospect of a strategic alliance with the United States. Eventually, the Reich's economy was exhausted by the never-ending counter-guerrilla warfare against Soviet Russia, and revolutions occurred across Europe as a result, leading to the total collapse of the Nazi regime.

== Cast ==
- Rutger Hauer as Sturmbannführer Xavier March
- Miranda Richardson as Charlotte "Charlie" Maguire
- Peter Vaughan as SS-Oberst-Gruppenführer Arthur Nebe
- Jean Marsh as Anna Von Hagen
- Michael Kitchen as Untersturmführer Max Jäger
- John Woodvine as Franz Luther
- John Shrapnel as Obergruppenführer Odilo Globocnik / "Globus"
- Rupert Penry-Jones as Hermann Jost
- Clive Russell as Karl Krebs
- Clare Higgins as Klara
- Neil Dudgeon as Hauptsturmführer Walther Fiebes
- Patronella Barker as Helga Schröder
- Sarah Berger as Leni Halder
- Rudolph Fleischer as Adolf Hitler
- Garrick Hagon as Elliot
- Jan Kohout as U.S. President Joseph P. Kennedy Sr.
- Michael J. Shannon as U.S. Ambassador
- Rory Jennings as Pili March
  - Rupert Degas as older Pili (voice; uncredited)
- David Ryall as Kruger

== Production ==
Mike Nichols bought the film rights before the novel was published in the United States. The project was initially developed as a theatrical feature, but subsequently moved to HBO after studios declined to finance it. Director Christopher Menaul attributed their reluctance to the story's dark subject matter and concerns about audience interest in Second World War stories. He described his intended approach as film noir, comparing the detective narrative to Chinatown. The film was budgeted at $7 million and filmed entirely in Prague.

To depict Berlin in an alternative 1964, the production combined Prague locations with matte paintings based on the architectural plans of Albert Speer. Menaul sought out postwar buildings rather than Prague's historic architecture, while matte artist Robert Stromberg created images of the monumental buildings envisioned for the Nazi capital. Producer Ilene Kahn described the contrast between older buildings and 1960s architecture as central to the film's visual design.

The newly opened Praha Penta Hotel, which is now Hilton Prague Old Town, doubled for Berlin's Hotel Adlon in which Maguire stays.

The former Czechoslovak Federal Assembly building, later used as the headquarters of Radio Free Europe/Radio Liberty and now part of the National Museum, served as the Berlin Police headquarters. The National Monument in Vitkov was used as the Sepp Dietrich SS Academy. The rear façade of the headquarters of Motokov, the Czech state car company, now the City Empiria tower, served as the exterior of the Reichsarchiv. The Nazi rally in the finale was filmed at Letná Park, including at the former Stalin Monument.

Fatherland filming locations in Prague

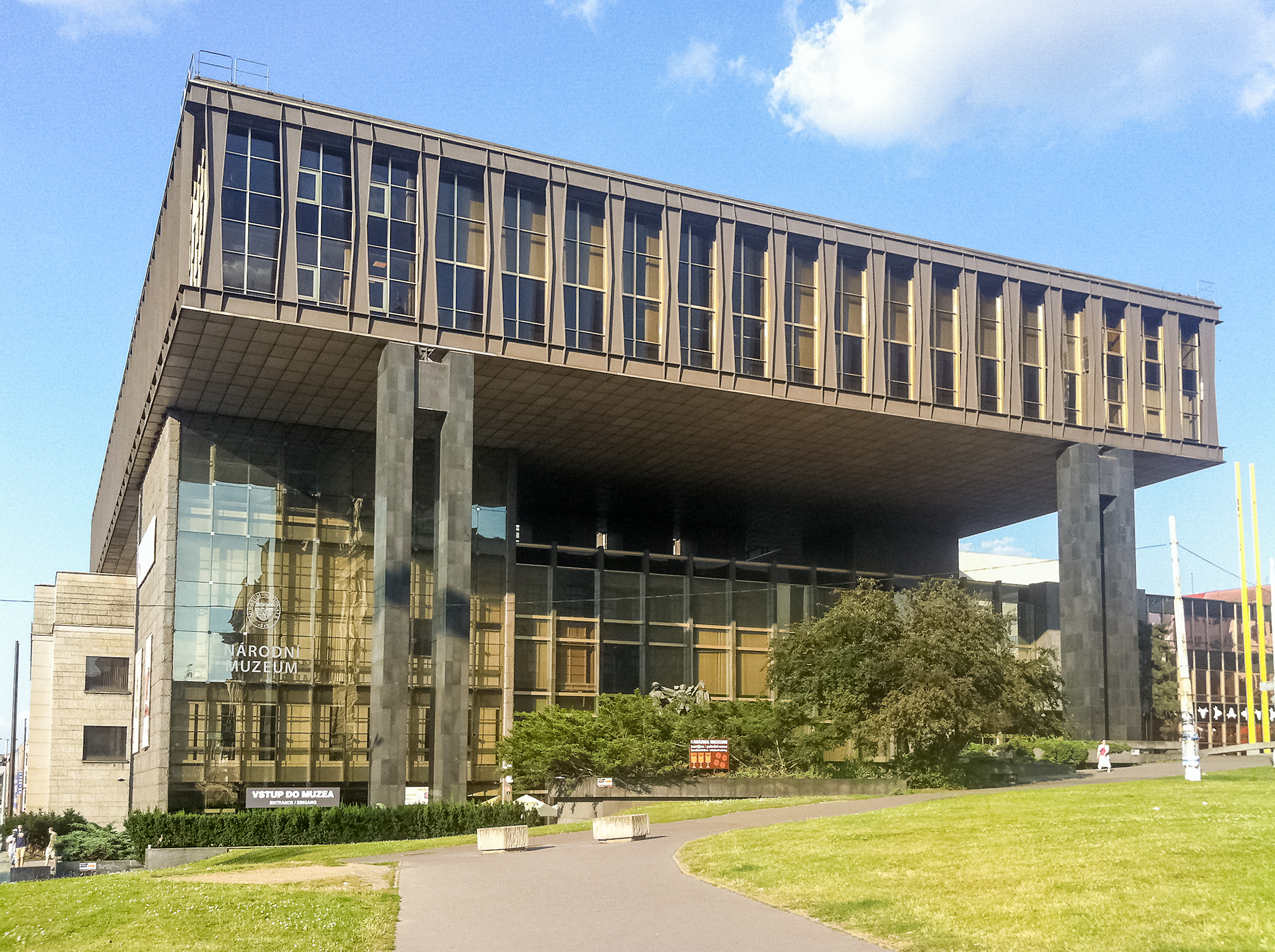
The New building of the National Museum, used as Berlin Police HQ

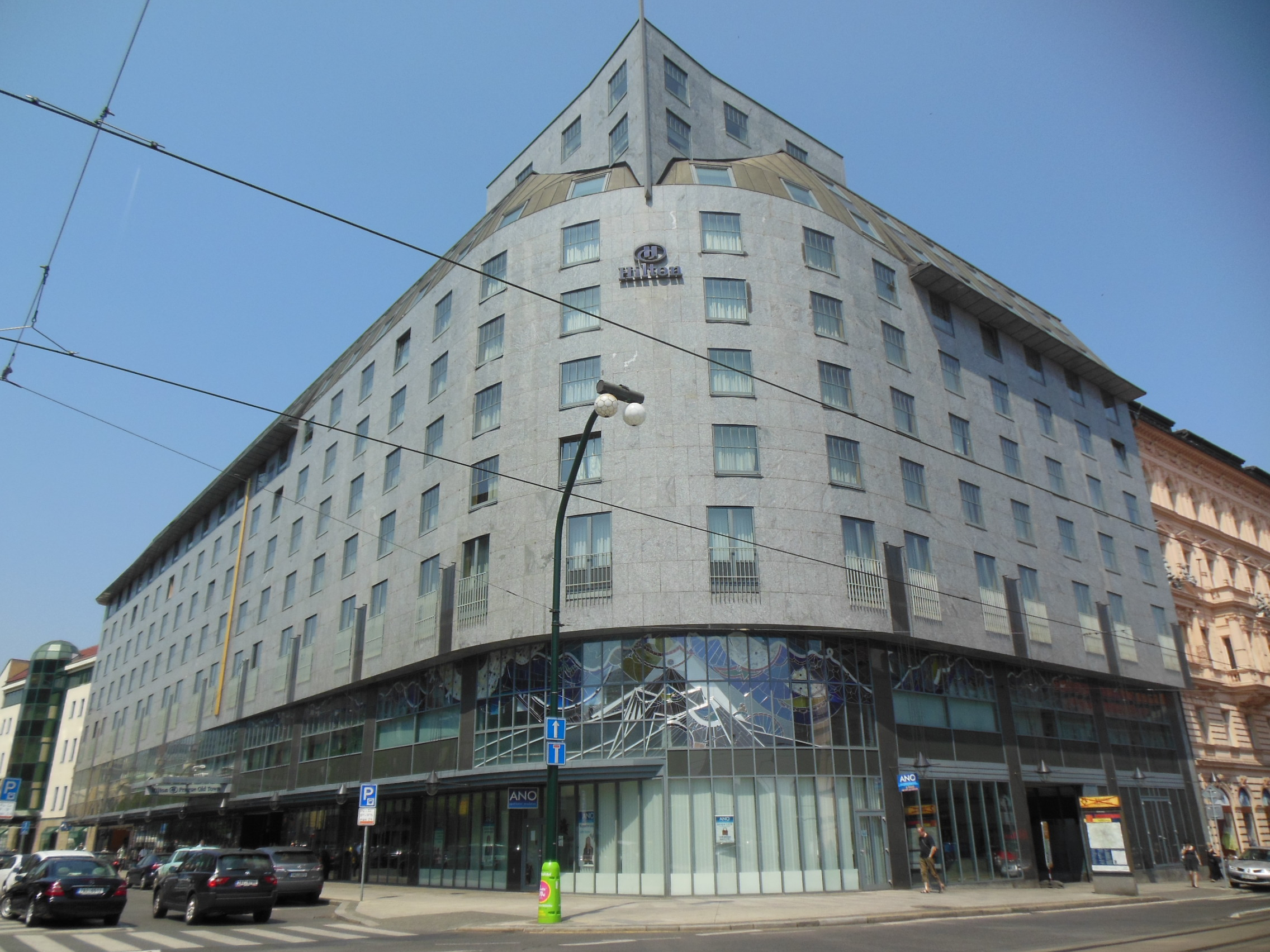
Hilton Prague Old Town, used as the Hotel Adlon

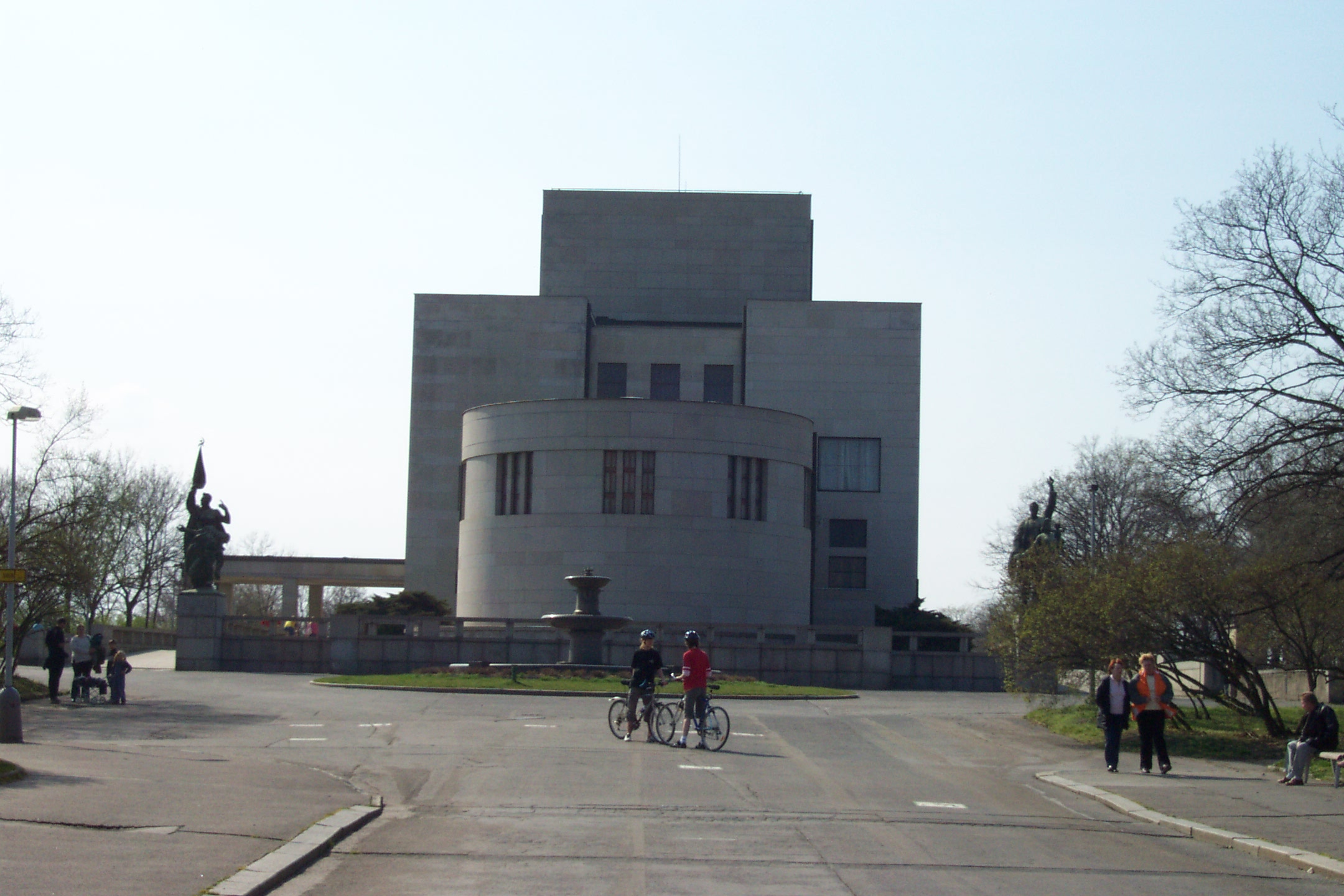
National Monument in Vitkov, used as the Sepp Dietrich SS Academy

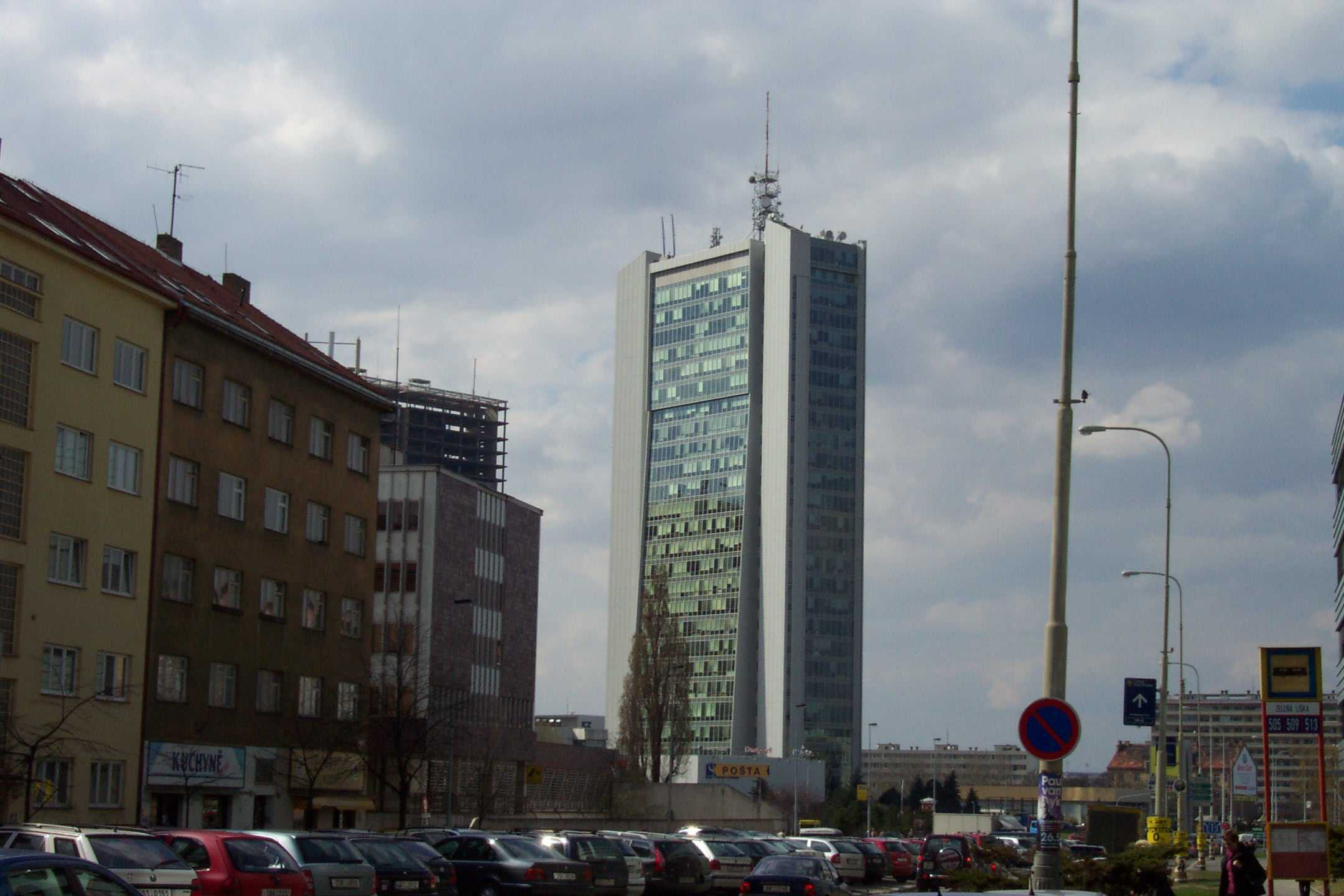
The Motokov tower, used as the Reichsarchiv

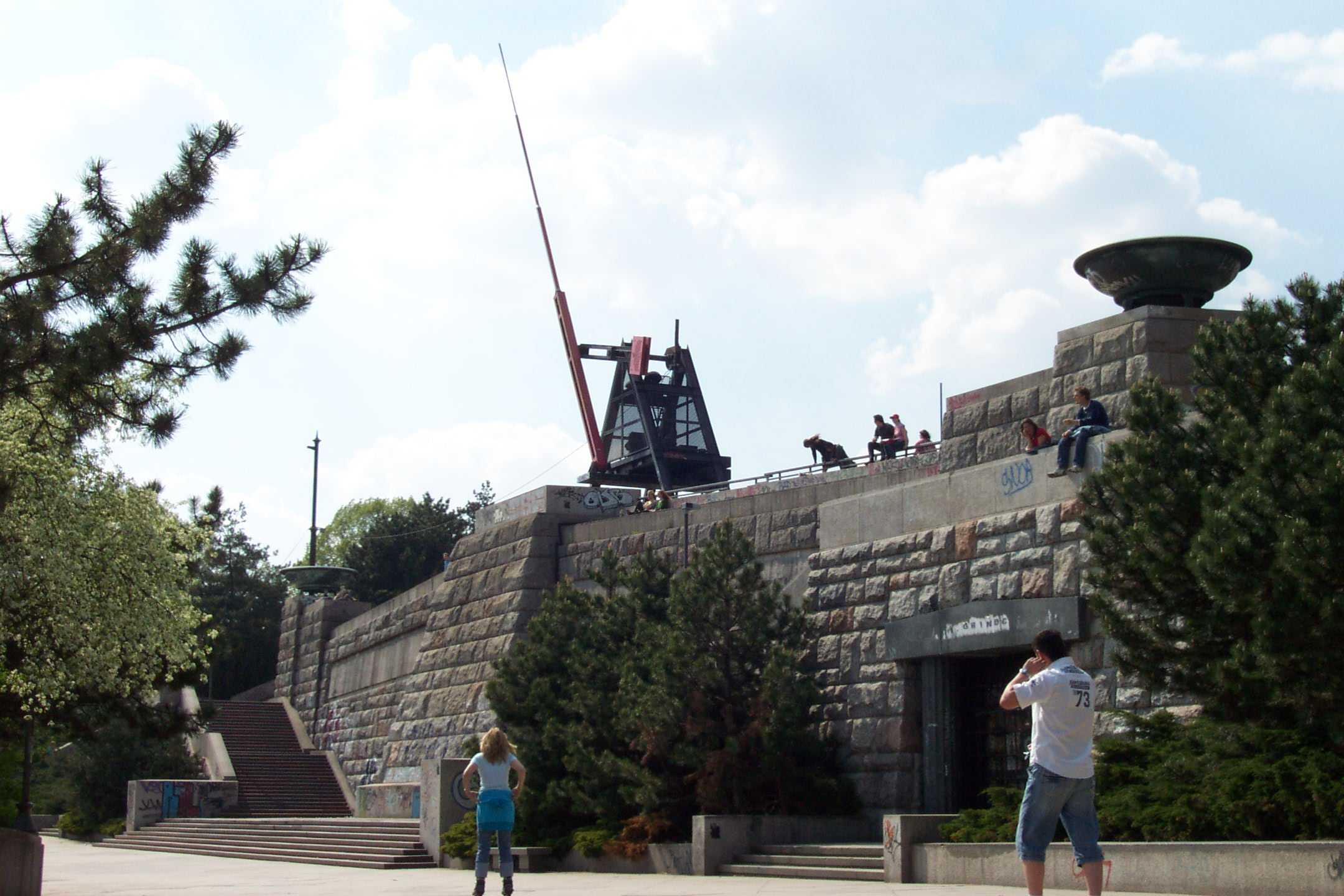
The former Stalin Monument in Letná Park, used for the Nazi rally in the finale

=== Screenplay and themes ===
Screenwriter Ron Hutchinson identified the audience's prior knowledge of the Holocaust as a central difficulty in adapting the novel. The screenplay had to sustain suspense around a secret already known to viewers, while allowing the characters to discover it gradually. Hutchinson also described the relationship between March and his son, who has been indoctrinated by the Nazi state, as the emotional center of the film.

Producer Ilene Kahn connected the film's depiction of the concealed Holocaust to contemporary Holocaust denial and the political indoctrination of children. Hutchinson likewise discussed the story in relation to the gradual normalization of authoritarian rule.

== Reception ==
The film received mixed reviews. The review aggregator Rotten Tomatoes reported an approval rating of 50% based on six reviews.

Ken Tucker of Entertainment Weekly gave the film a B+, praising the performances of Hauer and Richardson and Menaul's attention to details of the alternative historical setting. He nevertheless considered the central revelation too predictable.

Ray Loynd, writing in the Los Angeles Times, praised the film's visual effects and Menaul's direction, although he found parts of its political intrigue confusing. He considered the alternative historical setting effective as the basis for a speculative thriller.

Tom Shales of The Washington Post was more critical, arguing that the film reduced its provocative premise to a conventional political thriller. He questioned the plausibility of the Holocaust remaining concealed for two decades and critizised the screenplay and characterization, while praising the visual effects used to depict the architecture of the alternative Berlin.

=== Author response ===
Robert Harris criticized the adaptation in a 2012 interview with The Independent, calling it "a very bad film". He attributed his dissatisfaction to artistic compromises during production, particularly two major changes to the story that he felt had altered the character of the novel.

=== Awards and nominations ===
At the 52nd Golden Globe Awards in 1995, Miranda Richardson won Best Supporting Actress in a Series, Miniseries or Television Film. Rutger Hauer was nominated for Best Actor in a Miniseries or Television Film, while the film received a nomination for Best Miniseries or Television Film.

The film was also nominated for Outstanding Individual Achievement in Special Visual Effects at the 47th Primetime Emmy Awards, recognizing Richard Patterson, Robert Scifo, Robert Stromberg and David S. Williams.

Jean Marsh won the 1995 CableACE Award for Supporting Actress in a Movie or Miniseries for her portrayal of Anna von Hagen.
