= Murder in Mississippi (film) =

1990 American television film directed by Roger Young

- Genre: Crime; Drama
- Written by: Stanley Weiser
- Directed by: Roger Young
- Starring: Tom Hulce; Blair Underwood; Jennifer Grey
- Music by: Mason K. Daring; Elmer Bernstein (uncredited score withdrawn)
- Country of origin: United States
- Original language: English

Production
- Executive producers: David L. Wolper; Bernard Sofronski
- Producer: Mark Wolper
- Cinematography: Donald M. Morgan
- Editor: Benjamin A. Weissman
- Running time: 96 minutes
- Production company: Warner Bros. Television

Original release
- Network: NBC
- Release: February 5, 1990

Murder in Mississippi is a 1990 American television film which dramatized the last weeks of civil rights activists Michael "Mickey" Schwerner, Andrew Goodman and James Chaney, and the events leading up to their disappearance and subsequent murder during Freedom Summer in 1964. It starred Tom Hulce as Schwerner, Jennifer Grey as his wife Rita, Blair Underwood as Chaney, and Josh Charles as Goodman. Hulce received a nomination for Best Actor in a TV Miniseries at the 1990 Golden Globes. The film premiered on February 5, 1990, on NBC.

As a historical docudrama, Murder in Mississippi precedes the storylines of both 1975's Attack on Terror: The FBI vs. the Ku Klux Klan and 1988's Mississippi Burning.

Murder in Mississippi is the title of a 1965 Norman Rockwell painting depicting the same events. The painting is also known as Southern Justice.

== Plot ==
In 1964, members of the Ku Klux Klan murdered three Civil Rights workers who had traveled to the South to encourage African-American voter registration. The film examines the last three weeks in the lives of the slain activists.

== Cast ==
- Tom Hulce as Michael "Mickey" Schwerner
- Blair Underwood as James Chaney
- Jennifer Grey as Rita Schwerner
- Josh Charles as Andrew Goodman
- CCH Pounder as Fannie Lee Chaney
- Andre Braugher as Dennis
- Donzaleigh Abernathy as Sue
- Walton Goggins as Lyle
- Royce D. Applegate as Deputy Winter (based on Cecil Price)
- Scott Lawrence as Matt Suarez
- John Dennis Johnston as Hatchet-Faced Man

In addition, Murder in Mississippi features an early role of Greg Kinnear, who was a television personality at the time; Kinnear appears at the end as a reporter - also named Greg Kinnear - covering the discovery of the remains of Schwerner, Chaney, and Goodman.

== Critical reception ==
Empire wrote, "A TV movie true story with a good grasp on the history and politics of the time. Hulce shows off a fine beatnik beard, his closest black colleague CCH Pounder is properly suspicious of the naive do-gooder to start with and the people they're up against are convincingly vicious throughout. Misleadingly titled (in no way is this a thriller and the murder is right at the end), but otherwise, quite effectively done."

== See also ==
- Civil rights movement in popular culture
- Neshoba (2010 documentary film)
