= Medium Cool =

1969 film by Haskell Wexler

- Theatrical release poster
- Directed by: Haskell Wexler
- Written by: Haskell Wexler
- Produced by: Tully Friedman; Haskell Wexler; Jerrold Wexler
- Starring: Robert Forster; Verna Bloom; Peter Bonerz; Marianna Hill; Harold Blankenship
- Cinematography: Haskell Wexler
- Edited by: Verna Fields
- Music by: Mike Bloomfield
- Production companies: H & J Pictures
- Distributed by: Paramount Pictures
- Release date: August 27, 1969
- Running time: 110 minutes
- Country: United States
- Language: English
- Budget: $800,000
- Box office: $5.5 million (rentals)

Medium Cool is a 1969 American drama film written and directed by Haskell Wexler and starring Robert Forster, Verna Bloom, Peter Bonerz, Marianna Hill and Harold Blankenship. It takes place in Chicago in the summer of 1968. It was notable for Wexler's use of cinéma vérité–style documentary filmmaking techniques, as well as for combining fictional and non-fictional content.

The movie was met with widespread acclaim from numerous critics, including Roger Ebert and Gene Siskel of Siskel & Ebert, both calling the movie a "well-crafted masterpiece." The movie was also named one of the greatest movies of 1969, as well as one of the most influential movies in the New Hollywood movement. Robert Forster was also met with universal acclaim for his performance.

In 2003, the film was selected for preservation in the United States National Film Registry by the Library of Congress as being "culturally, historically, or aesthetically significant".

== Plot ==
John Cassellis is a television news cameraman. He and his sound recorder dispassionately film images of car accidents rather than help the victims. Cassellis is seemingly hardened to ethical and social issues; he is more concerned with his personal life and pursuing audience-grabbing stories. Yet once Cassellis finds out that his news station has been providing the stories and information gathered by the cameramen and news journalists to the FBI, he becomes enraged. The news station creates an excuse to fire him, but he soon finds another job free-lancing at the Democratic National Convention.

In the course of his television job, Cassellis meets Eileen, a single mother, and her son, Harold, who have moved from West Virginia to Chicago. Harold tells a woman canvassing the neighborhood that his father, Buddy, is "at Vietnam", but later tells Cassellis that he just took off one day and never came back. Eileen tells Cassellis that "Buddy is dead." Cassellis grows fond of them both, mother and son.

When Harold goes missing, Eileen goes to the site of the convention to ask Cassellis for help. She finds herself in the midst of the riots. After witnessing acts of police brutality, Eileen finds Cassellis. As they drive to an undisclosed location, unaware that Harold has returned home, Cassellis accidentally crashes the car into a tree, killing Eileen and critically injuring himself. A passing driver stops to photograph the accident, after which he leaves the heavily damaged car behind.

== Cast ==
- Robert Forster as John Cassellis
- Verna Bloom as Eileen
- Peter Bonerz as Gus
- Marianna Hill as Ruth
- Harold Blankenship as Harold
- Charles Geary as Harold's father
- Sid McCoy as Frank Baker
- Christine Bergstrom as Dede
- Peter Boyle as Gun clinic manager
- China Lee as Roller derby patron

== Production ==
The title comes from Marshall McLuhan's 1964 work Understanding Media: The Extensions of Man, in which he described TV as a "cool" medium (the "cooler" the medium, "the more someone has to uncover and engage in the media" in order to "fill in the blanks"). The film questions the role and responsibilities of television and its newscasts.

The music in the film was assembled by guitarist Mike Bloomfield (Haskell Wexler's cousin). The film features contemporary music from the early Mothers of Invention albums by rock musician Frank Zappa, as well as the Love instrumental "Emotions" over the opening credits and as a recurring theme. Wexler has said the scene under the opening credits with the bike messenger delivering film to the television station was inspired by Jean Cocteau's film Orpheus.

Harold Blankenship, who played the young boy Harold in Medium Cool, was tracked down by filmmaker Paul Cronin (who made the documentary Look out Haskell, it's real) and appears in Cronin's film Sooner or Later. Blankenship named his first son after Haskell Wexler.

Marianna Hill's full nude scene wasn't planned but the actress explained, "Haskell was such a lovely man and I knew he couldn't cause me any harm. I would never have done that for anybody else, but he was so interested in getting to the truth of a matter, and it was really his story."

== Historical context ==
Shot at a time of great social and political counterculture upheaval in the United States, Wexler's film reflects the nature of a country divided by issues of race, gender, poverty, crime and war. Such themes were touched upon by more mainstream films such as Getting Straight and The Strawberry Statement but Wexler's treatment was considered controversial – the Motion Picture Association of America film rating system gave it an 'X' rating. The censors "objected to the language and the nudity", Wexler said later; "What no one had the nerve to say was that it was a political 'X'". In 1970 the film was re-rated 'R'.

== Critical response ==
Much of the critical response to Medium Cool concentrated on the revolutionary techniques of combining fact and fiction rather than the plot of the film. In his 1969 review, Roger Ebert wrote "In Medium Cool, Wexler forges back and forth through several levels...There are fictional characters in real situations...there are real characters in fictional situations". While Ebert did not find the plot to be particularly innovative, he acknowledged that Wexler purposely left it up to his audience to fill in the gaps of the romance and at the same time presented images of great political significance. Ultimately, Ebert credited Wexler with masterfully combining multiple levels of film making to create a film that is "important and absorbing". Ebert placed the film second on his list of the 10 best pictures of 1969.

In his 1969 review of the film for The New York Times, Vincent Canby credits Wexler with presenting his audience with powerful imagery through the use of documentary film techniques. He wrote that Medium Cool was "an angry, technically brilliant movie that uses some of the real events of last year the way other movies use real places — as backgrounds that are extensions of the fictional characters". Like Ebert, Canby pointed out that the political atmosphere of the film fills in the blanks left open by a relatively superficial plot. Canby noted the film's historical significance, "The result is a film of tremendous visual impact, a kind of cinematic Guernica, a picture of America in the process of exploding into fragmented bits of hostility, suspicion, fear and violence". Like Ebert, Canby felt that the real significance of the film was in its capturing of a political situation rather than its conventional success through plot and character development. Canby wrote that "Medium Cool is an awkward and even pretentious movie, but... it has an importance that has nothing to do with literature".

On the review aggregator website Rotten Tomatoes, 96% of 26 critics' reviews are positive. The website's consensus reads: "Medium Cool merges a bracing cinéma vérité with deft drama to authentically chronicle a nation at odds with itself and a media struggling to get the story straight." Metacritic, which uses a weighted average, assigned the film a score of 87 out of 100, based on 10 critics, indicating "universal acclaim".

== Film archives ==
35 mm safety prints are housed at the Harvard Film Archive, the Yale Film Archive and the Chicago Film Society.

== Home media ==
Medium Cool was released to home video on May 21, 2013, by the Criterion Collection (under license from Paramount) as a Region 1 DVD and as a Region 1 Blu-Ray.

== See also ==
- List of American films of 1969
- Prologue, a 1969 Canadian film that also blends cinéma vérité-style documentary and fiction, set against the Democratic National Convention
