= Franz Rademacher =

German lawyer and diplomat (1906–1973)

- Born: 20 February 1906; Neustrelitz, Mecklenburg-Strelitz, German Empire
- Died: 17 March 1973 (aged 67); Bonn, West Germany
- Occupations: Lawyer, diplomat
- Known for: Proposing the Madagascar Plan
- Political party: Nazi Party

Franz Rademacher (20 February 1906 – 17 March 1973) was a German lawyer and diplomat. As an official in the Nazi government of the Third Reich during World War II, he was known for initiating action on the Madagascar Plan.

== Early life and career ==
Rademacher was born on 20 February 1906 in Neustrelitz, Mecklenburg-Strelitz. His father was a railway engineer.

Rademacher studied law in Rostock and Munich and entered the profession as a jurist in April 1932.

== Under Nazism ==
He held membership in the Sturmabteilung (Nazi stormtroopers) between 1932 and 1934. In 1933, he joined the Nazi Party. He was a vocal antisemite.

From 1937, he was a diplomat with the German Foreign Office and served at the German embassy in Montevideo, Uruguay, until May 1940. In 1940, he was selected to lead Referat D III, or Judenreferat, of Joachim von Ribbentrop's Foreign Affairs Ministry. His direct superior was the Nazi diplomat Martin Luther. It was during his tenure in that office, throughout the spring and summer of 1940, that Rademacher initiated the Madagascar Plan, which sought to forcibly deport all of Europe's Jews to the island of Madagascar. He clashed briefly with Adolf Eichmann over organizational control of the plan, which would shortly be abandoned because of Germany's changing fortunes in World War II.

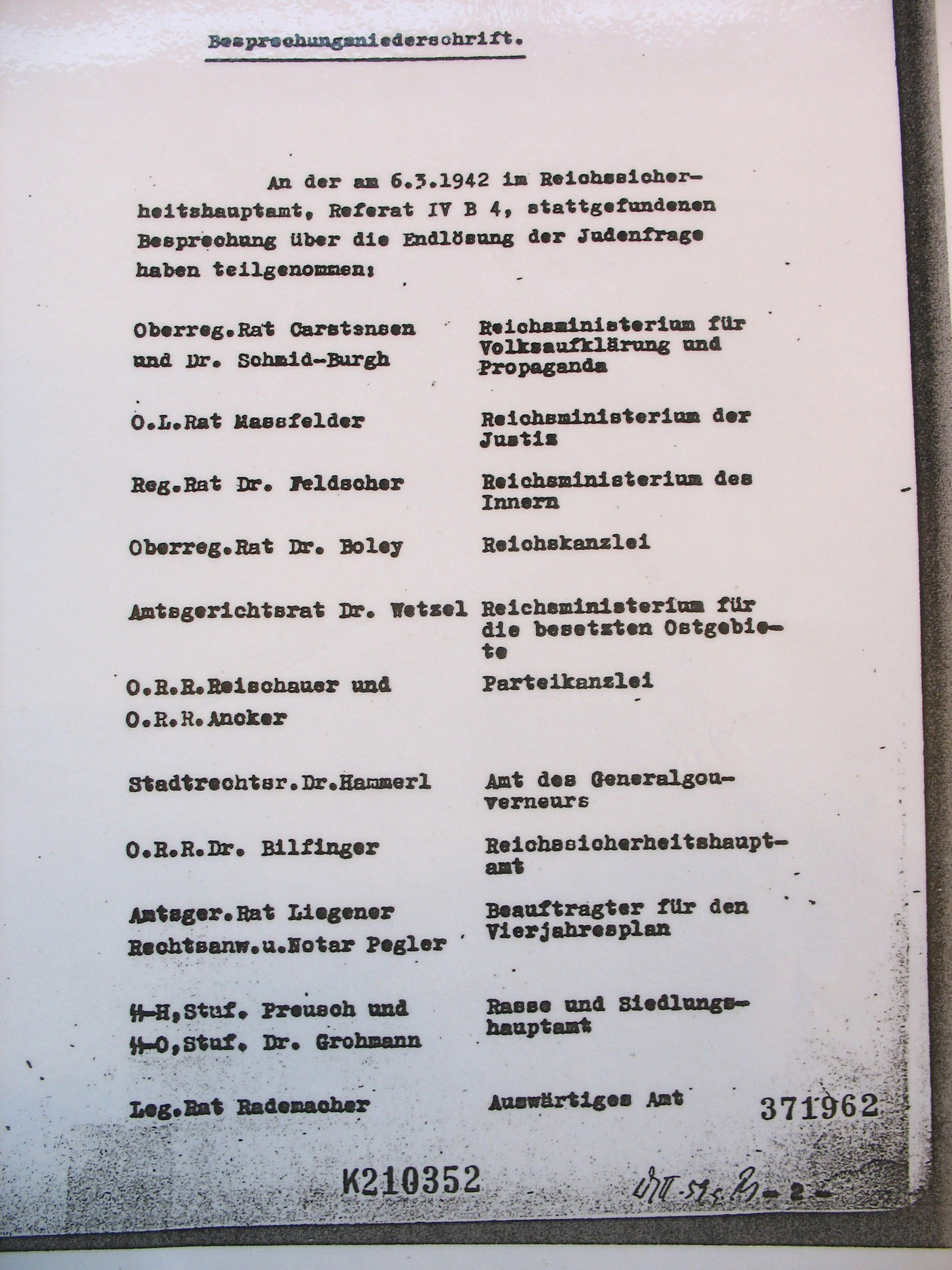
Rademacher as a participant in the meeting on the Final Solution of the Jewish Question on 6 March 1942 at the Reich Main Security Office

In October 1941, Rademacher was responsible for mass deportations and executions of Serbian Jews. He also had a hand in the deportation of Jews from France, Belgium and the Netherlands. After his visit to Belgrade, Rademacher filed an expense claim stating that the official purpose of the trip was to "liquidate the Jews". In 2010, the German Foreign Ministry released an 880-page report on the diplomats of the Third Reich, entitled The Ministry and the Past (Das Amt und die Vergangenheit), which mentioned that particular expense claim and brought Rademacher a degree of latter-day notoriety.

In 1943, Rademacher became embroiled in Luther's attempted coup to oust Ribbentrop. He was dismissed from the Foreign Affairs Ministry and sent to fight in the navy as an officer for the remainder of the war. He ended up with Admiral Karl Dönitz's cypher-breaking unit at Flensburg-Mürwik under the command of Captain Kupfer. Immediately after the war, the unit was put at the disposal of Sefton Delmer's news agency in Hamburg.

== Postwar ==
Rademacher was eventually brought to trial in West Germany in February 1952 for the murders that he had supervised in Serbia. A German court convicted him for the murder of Serbian Jews and sentenced him to three years and five months of imprisonment. Rademacher was released from prison in July 1952 due to time served. However, with the aid of Nazi sympathizers, he fled to Syria in August 1952 to avoid other potential charges.

== Later life ==
In 1962, the Israeli spy Eli Cohen delivered a letter bomb to Rademacher in a failed assassination attempt. In July 1963, Rademacher was arrested on charges of spying in Syria. He spent over two years in prison, before being released on health grounds in October 1965. He returned voluntarily to West Germany on 30 November 1966, where he was taken into custody by the security police on the tarmac at the Nuremberg Airport. Reportedly ill at the time, he was taken to a prison hospital in Bayreuth while he was awaiting prosecution in Bamberg. He was once more convicted of war crimes and sentenced to five-and-a-half years of imprisonment. However, his sentence was never carried out, the court having considered it already served.

In 1971, a West German high court in Karlsruhe overruled the judgment against Rademacher and ordered a new trial for his crimes during the Second World War. He died on 17 March 1973 before proceedings had begun.
