= Freedom Song (film) =

- VHS cover
- Written by: Phil Alden Robinson; Stanley Weiser
- Directed by: Phil Alden Robinson
- Starring: Danny Glover; Vicellous Reon Shannon; Vondie Curtis-Hall; Loretta Devine; Glynn Turman
- Theme music composer: James Horner
- Country of origin: United States
- Original language: English

Production
- Producers: Phil Alden Robinson; Danny Glover; Carolyn McDonald; Sean Daniel
- Cinematography: John Lindley; Amy Vincent
- Editor: Maysie Hoy
- Running time: 112 minutes
- Production companies: Turner Films, Inc.

Original release
- Network: TNT
- Release: February 27, 2000

Freedom Song is a 2000 biographical made-for-television drama film based on true stories of the Civil Rights Movement in Mississippi in the 1960s. It tells the story of the struggle of African Americans to register to vote in the fictional town of Quinlan. In the midst of the Freedom Summer, a group of high school students in the small town are eager to make grassroots changes in their own community. The young activists meet resistance not only from white southerners, but from their parents, who have experienced firsthand the violence that can result from speaking out. As high school students band together with the support of the Student Nonviolent Coordinating Committee, they make strides in registering African-American voters and gaining awareness for their cause.

The film was made for television and released on February 27, 2000, on the TNT TV channel in the United States. It was written and directed by Phil Alden Robinson and co-written by Stanley Weiser. Winner of the Image Award, Writers Guild of America award, and Golden Gate Award, it stars Danny Glover, Vicellous Reon Shannon, and Vondie Curtis-Hall.

== Plot ==
Freedom Song is told in flashbacks from the perspective of Owen Walker, a high school student in the fictional town of Quinlan, Mississippi in the early 1960s. Growing up in an insulated black community, Owen is oblivious to the white supremacy that still reigned in his town until he has a run-in with racists at a local bus station. While waiting for the bus, five-year-old Owen wanders unknowingly into the "Whites Only" diner. His father, Will, soon follows quickly behind and is forced by white diner attendants to spank his son in public. Will later tells his son, "someday you'll be eating at this counter". But this scene of public humiliation leaves a lasting scar on their relationship.

Will Walker had been a civil rights activist in the late 1940s. After returning from World War II, where he fought for freedom of oppressed groups abroad, Will resented the continued oppression of African Americans in his hometown. He worked to register African Americans to vote in order to replace the town's racist sheriff. Will's organizing was met with violent resistance by white supremacists. One night, when Will, his wife, and young son were in the house sleeping, Klansmen shot at their house. The family survived, but townspeople began to boycott Will's store, and he was driven out of business. Will was left with lingering feeling that organizing for equality was dangerous and worthless.

As Owen grows up, he becomes increasingly restless in the face of injustices against African Americans. He is inspired by the Freedom Riders he sees in the newspapers and on television, who are staging sit-ins across the South. When a Student Nonviolent Coordinating Committee (SNCC) organizer, Mr. Wall, comes to Quinlan from Chicago, Owen is excited for the possibility of some action. But Wall is there to help African Americans register to vote. Owen's peers begin the slow, steady work of teaching eligible voters to pass the literacy test and register. While the voter registrants are met with resistance by white city officials, their movement is gaining steam, and Owen decides to become a part of it. Owen's parents still fear his involvement in agitating against white power, but alongside his friends and SNCC organizers, Owen continues to fight for justice.

The struggle for equality is not without a backlash from whites in the town. A verbal altercation downtown results in an older, respected black man getting shot and killed. As the town mourns their loss, Wall and other organizers feel responsible for stirring things up in such a volatile environment as Mississippi. The movement has not lost hope yet, and the organizers decide to begin staging strategic sit-ins at all-white establishments around the community. Protesters are arrested several times, culminating in a four-month sentence for Owen, Mr. Wall, and the youth's fellow friends and organizers, Charlie and Isaac. From the county jail, the organizers are heartened to learn that comrades from New Orleans have come to Quinlan to stand in solidarity for their cause. After Owen and his fellow organizers are released, segregation becomes illegal. Owen is able to dine with his father and reconcile at what was not long ago the "Whites Only" counter.

== Cast ==
- Danny Glover as Will Walker
- Vicellous Reon Shannon as Owen Walker
- Vondie Curtis-Hall as Daniel Wall
- Loretta Devine as Evelyn Walker
- Glynn Turman as T-Bone Lanier
- Stan Shaw as Archie Mullen
- Michael Jai White as Coleman Vaughnes
- John Beasley as Jonah Summer
- Jason Weaver as Isaac Hawkins
- Rae'Ven Larrymore Kelly as Dora Charles
- Marcello Thedford as Tyrone Franklin
- David Strathairn as Peter Crowley
- Peter Bonner Briggs as Bus Scion Arresting Officer

== Production ==
Freedom Song was filmed in Burgaw and Wilmington, North Carolina in 1999.

== Accolades ==
Freedom Song was a nominee and recipient of numerous awards for writing, acting and sound. In 2001, Danny Glover won the Image Award for Outstanding Actor in a Television Movie, Mini-Series, or Dramatic Special for his performance in the film. Writer and director Phil Robinson won the 2001 Golden Gate Award for Drama-Television Feature. The film tied with Tina Andrews' Sally Hemings: An American Scandal for the Writers Guild of America Award for Original Long Form. It was also nominated for two Primetime Emmys, three Black Reel Awards, the Humanitas Prize, a Screen Actors Guild Award and a YoungStar Award. The soundtrack by James Horner was released as an album.

== See also ==
- Civil rights movement in popular culture
