= The Dinosaur Times =

The Dinosaur Times was a magazine published by the founders of The Monster Times. The magazine was established in 1993 and was published by Les Waldstein and Larry Brill. The editor was Edward Summer. Although four issues were written and designed, only three were ever published. Unlike The Monster Times, The Dinosaur Times was in full color. The publisher was CSK Publishing Co. and the magazine, targeting children 9 years old and older, was based in Saddle Brook, New Jersey. The magazine was established on a quarterly basis.

Contributing writers included Don Glut, Michael Brett-Surman, Daniel Cohen, and Richard Milner. Contributing artists included Bob Walters, Brian Franczyk, and Gray Morrow.
