= The Monster Times =

US magazine

- Cover of the May 10, 1972 issue (#8) of The Monster Times
- Editor: Chuck R. McNaughton, Allen Asherman, Joe Brancatelli, Tom Rogers, Joe Kane
- Categories: horror film magazine
- Frequency: erratically
- Publisher: The Monster Times Publishing Co.
- Founder: Larry Brill and Les Waldstein
- First issue: January 26, 1972; 54 years ago
- Final issue Number: July 1976; 50 years ago 48 + 3 Specials
- Country: United States
- Language: English

The Monster Times was a horror film fan magazine created in 1972. Published by The Monster Times Publishing Co., it was intended as a competitor to Famous Monsters of Filmland. Although the main editorial focus of the magazine was horror media, it also featured articles and reviews of modern and classic science fiction/fantasy films and television series, as well as comic books. Each issue featured a fold-out centerfold poster, usually based on that particular issue's feature story.

The Monster Times was edited at various times in its formative years by Chuck R. McNaughton, Allen Asherman, Joe Brancatelli and Tom Rogers. Joe Kane (who later assumed the nom de plume The Phantom of the Movies for newspaper columns and books) took over as editor with Issue # 11 (June 14, 1972), and remained in that capacity until the periodical's demise. The publishers were art directors Larry Brill and Les Waldstein, who were the original designers for the pornographic weekly tabloid Screw, and also for Famous Monsters of Filmland and other Jim Warren publications in the late 1960s.

== Publication history ==
The first issue is dated January 26, 1972. Printed on newspaper-quality paper stock, with a more refined white paper for covers and other content in earlier issues, the magazine was published on a biweekly schedule for its first fourteen issues, then switched to monthly until 1975, at which point it became a bi-monthly publication.

In 1973, The Monster Times conducted a poll to determine the most popular movie monster. Godzilla was voted the most popular movie monster, beating Count Dracula, King Kong, Wolf Man, The Mummy, Creature From the Black Lagoon, and Frankenstein's monster.

Its final few issues were published erratically, and the title ceased publication in July 1976 with issue # 48.

Three Monster Times special issues were also published: Star Trek Lives #1, subtitled "Sci-Fi Super TV Special Issue" (1972), Star Trek Lives #2 (1974) and an untitled all giant monster poster special (1976).

== Contributors ==
Contributing writers and photographers included Michael Uslan, Joe Kane, Doug Murray, Allan Asherman, Steve Vertlieb, Phil Seuling, Buddy Weiss, Frank Verzyl, Dean Latimer, Edward Summer, Joe Brancatelli, Manny Maris, Mark Rainey, Tom Murdock, and Jason Thomas (aka Tom Rogers). Contributing artists included Gray Morrow, Jeff Jones, Neal Adams, Bernie Wrightson and Larry Vincent (aka: Sinister Seymour).

In the 1990s, an attempt by Brill and Waldstein to target a similar market resulted in a few issues of The Dinosaur Times.

In October 2019, Little Shoppe of Horrors magazine published a detailed article on the history of The Monster Times, including sseveral in-depth interviews with people who worked for the publication in its heyday.
