= Martin Luther (diplomat) =

German Nazi diplomat (1895–1945)

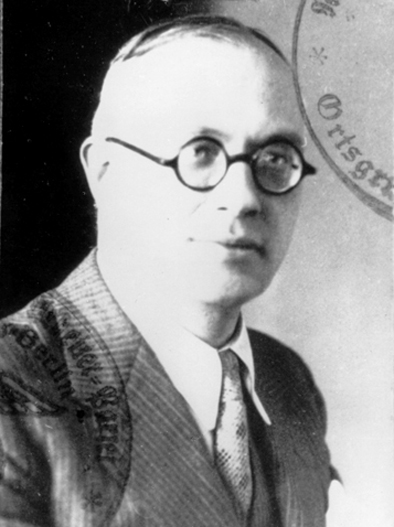

Undersecretary (from July 1941) Head of Abteilung D (Deutschland) Reich Foreign Office
- In office 7 May 1940 – 10 February 1943
- Minister: Joachim von Ribbentrop

Head of Referat Partei Reich Foreign Office
- In office November 1938 – 7 May 1940
- Minister: Joachim von Ribbentrop

Head of Party Liaison Office Ribbentrop Bureau
- In office August 1936 – November 1938

Personal details
- Born: 16 December 1895 Berlin, German Empire
- Died: 13 May 1945 (aged 49) Berlin, Soviet occupation zone
- Occupation: Businessman; Diplomat
- Known for: Wannsee Conference participant

Military service
- Allegiance: German Empire
- Branch/service: Imperial German Army
- Years of service: 1914–1918
- Rank: Leutnant der Reserves
- Battles/wars: World War I
- Awards: Iron Cross, 2nd class

Martin Franz Julius Luther (German: [ˈmaʁtiːn ˈlʊtɐ], 16 December 1895 – 13 May 1945) was a German diplomat. A member of the Nazi Party, he was a protégé of Foreign Minister Joachim von Ribbentrop, first as an advisor in the Ribbentrop Bureau (Dienststelle Ribbentrop), and later as a diplomat in the Foreign Office (Auswärtiges Amt). He participated in the 20 January 1942 Wannsee Conference, at which the genocidal Final Solution to the Jewish Question was planned. It was the 1946 discovery of his copy of the minutes of that conference that first brought to light the existence of the conference and its purpose. After plotting to replace Ribbentrop, Luther was arrested in February 1943 and sent to a concentration camp. He died of natural causes weeks after the end of the Second World War in Europe.

== Early life ==
Luther attended a Gymnasium until August 1914 when he left school without obtaining his Abitur to enlist in the Imperial German Army. He participated in the First World War as a member of a railway unit, attained the rank of Leutnant of reserves in 1917 and was awarded the Iron Cross, second class. Discharged from the army at the end of the war, he went into business and used his skill at logistics to found a hauling and furniture moving business. His first venture went bankrupt in the poor economic climate of the Weimar Republic but he started another furniture moving and interior decorating business. He eventually became very successful, living in the affluent Zehlendorf neighborhood of Berlin. He owned an apartment building and was sufficiently financially secure to turn his attention to politics.

Luther joined the Nazi Party (membership number 1,010,333) and its paramilitary branch, the SA, on 1 March 1932. He was active in helping to raise funds for the Party in his capacity as the head of the local National Socialist People's Welfare, the Party's charity organization. In the course of his work, he made the acquaintance of the wealthy wine merchant and Adolf Hitler's foreign policy advisor Joachim von Ribbentrop and his wife. He was commissioned to redecorate their villa and expand their private stables. He also was of assistance to Ribbentrop in getting him a low Party number. When Ribbentrop was sent to London as ambassador in 1936, he hired Luther to move his furniture from Berlin and do the interior decorating of the new German Embassy at Carlton House Terrace.

== Nazi career ==
=== Ribbentrop Bureau ===
In August 1936, Ribbentrop offered Luther a position in the Dienststelle Ribbentrop (Ribbentrop Bureau), his own Nazi Party shadow foreign policy organisation that he had established to circumvent the long-serving career diplomats in the Foreign Office. The bureau offices were on the Wilhelmstrasse, directly across the street from the Foreign Office. Luther accepted and was placed in charge of the Party liaison office. After Ribbentrop replaced Konstantin von Neurath as the Reichsminister for Foreign Affairs in February 1938, he wanted to bring Luther into the Foreign Office. However, Luther was being investigated on a charge of embezzlement of Party funds in connection with his earlier charity fund-raising activities. Ribbentrop sought the assistance of Martin Bormann who was the chief of staff in the office of Deputy Führer Rudolf Hess. Bormann, whose father-in-law was Walter Buch, the head of the Supreme Party Court, intervened and the investigation was dismissed.

=== Reich Foreign Office ===
In November 1938, Luther was appointed as head of the sub-department Referat Partei, which carried out liaison activities between the ministry and the Party. On 7 May 1940, his remit was expanded when he persuaded Ribbentrop to appoint him as head of the Abteilung D (Deutschland), a new department combining several Referate. In addition to his existing functions, the ambitious Luther now was given responsibility for foreign travel, printing and distribution of written materials, liaison with the Schutzstaffel (SS) and, significantly, Jewish policy under Referat D III, which he entrusted to Franz Rademacher. Over the next year, he managed to further expand his areas of responsibility, doubling the number of Referate reporting to him. The new department was headquartered in its own building in the Tiergarten section of the city. That physical distance contributed to Luther's autonomy. Contacts between the ministry and Abteilung D were mainly by telephone, and Luther rarely participated in the daily meetings of senior officials at the ministry. Messages from the SS, and its subordinate security section the RSHA, were sent directly to Luther and not through higher officials as was customary. In this way, Luther was able to control which matters were and were not shared with other ministry departments. He also was the person who most often represented the ministry in high-level staff consultations between the various ministries and the SS.

By July 1941, Luther was advanced to the civil service rank of Ministerialdirektor with the title of Unterstaatssekretär (Under State Secretary). In addition, in 1942 he was promoted to the rank of SA-Brigadeführer. Thus, Luther was at the height of his power when he attended the Wannsee Conference on 20 January 1942 as the official representative of the Foreign Ministry. He was the only undersecretary invited, with most other ministry representatives being full state secretaries. This was due to the conference organizer, SS-Obergruppenführer Reinhard Heydrich, who much preferred dealing with the ambitious and cooperative Luther, rather than the aristocratic Foreign Office traditionalist, State Secretary Ernst von Weizsäcker. In preparation for the meeting, Luther had his staff compose a memorandum on 8 December 1941 to set out "our wishes and desires". That document committed the ministry to working with other countries to introduce antisemitic restrictions modeled on the Nuremberg Laws, and then to transport their Jews to the east. Following the conference, Luther's department was involved with preparing and securing agreement at the diplomatic level for the deportation of Jews from the countries allied with Germany, such as Bulgaria, Croatia, Hungary, Romania and Slovakia, as well as from the areas occupied by Germany.

=== Downfall, arrest and death ===
During this period, Luther also continued to work as an interior decorator for Ribbentrop's wife, helping her with the design of her various houses as well as her clothes. He resented this, stating that she treated him like one of her household servants. For her part, she found him tiring and boorish. More importantly, Ribbentrop was becoming increasingly dissatisfied with him, particularly for not advancing the Foreign Office's interests in the bureaucratic struggle over foreign policy with Reichsführer-SS Heinrich Himmler. In addition, new allegations surfaced of Luther being entangled with financial irregularities involving the personnel office. Ribbentrop had also received complaints that Luther was blackmailing two individuals by threatening them with the Gestapo, and this triggered yet another investigation into Luther's behavior.

In early 1943, threatened on several fronts, Luther plotted to supplant Ribbentrop by attempting to discredit him. Though reports vary, he most likely sought assistance in this from SS-Brigadeführer Walter Schellenberg, head of the SS foreign intelligence service, who himself had ambitions of replacing Ribbentrop. Luther wrote an extensive memorandum, in which he went into detail about what he believed to be Ribbentrop's mental weaknesses, portraying him as mentally ill and unfit for his position. He forwarded it to Schellenberg to gain the support of the SS. However, when the memo was brought to Himmler, he viewed it as the worst type of disloyalty, and had the incriminating document delivered directly to Ribbentrop. Luther was arrested by the Gestapo on 10 February 1943 and his Abteilung D was dissolved. Hitler wanted to have him hanged, but Himmler instead persuaded him to have Luther sent to the Sachsenhausen concentration camp in March. There he was put to work cultivating the camp herb garden. After two suicide attempts, he was freed over two years later when the camp was liberated by the Red Army in April 1945, but was hospitalized and died shortly afterward of heart failure. He never faced trial for his involvement in the planning of the Holocaust.

== Luther's Wannsee Conference memorandum ==
The meeting minutes of the Wannsee Conference showing "Unterstaatssekretär Luther" as a participant

Copies of the official minutes of the Wannsee Conference were sent to all participants and were stamped with the highest security classification of Geheime Reichssache. Luther's copy of the minutes is the only record of the conference that survived the war. It was located in the archives of the Foreign Office in December 1946 and its discovery marked the first time the Allies became aware of the meeting. Though found too late to be used at the International Military Tribunal of the major Nazi leaders in 1945–46 in Nuremberg, it played an important role in the later Ministries Trial of 1948–49 and was used in the prosecution of senior officials of various ministries.

The fact that the minutes speak only of "evacuations" has been used by Holocaust deniers to argue that the conference did not present a policy of genocide. However, Luther was among those who already knew that policy with regard to the "Jewish question" had changed. In October 1941, he was made aware by his subordinate, Rademacher, that 8,000 Serbian Jewish men were not being deported but instead had been shot. Also, beginning in October 1941, the SS had been sending periodic situation reports to the Foreign Office concerning the operations of the Einsatzgruppen in the Soviet Union. The reports documented the extent and systematic nature of the mass killing of Jews that already was taking place. Luther saw these reports and was personally involved in preparing a summary of one of the lengthy reports. The Wannsee minutes also document that at the conference Luther noted that difficulties would arise in some countries, such as the Scandinavian states, if the plan were to be put in place there, and that it would therefore be advisable to defer actions in those countries. However, he saw no such great difficulties arising for actions in southeast and western Europe, thereby giving the Foreign Office's concurrence with implementing the Final Solution in those areas.

== Portrayals in media ==
- Luther is played by Hans-Werner Bussinger in the German television drama-documentary Die Wannseekonferenz (1984).
- Luther played an integral part in Robert Harris' 1992 alternate history novel, Fatherland. In the 1994 HBO film adaptation, Luther was renamed Franz Luther and was played by John Woodvine.
- In the 2001 HBO film Conspiracy, Luther is played by Kevin McNally.
- Luther is briefly portrayed in Daniel Silva's 2003 book The Confessor, which is part of Silva's Gabriel Allon series.
- In the 2022 German film Die Wannseekonferenz, he was played by the Austrian actor Simon Schwarz.
- Luther is portrayed by Paul Schröder in the 2026 Swedish film The Swedish Connection.

== Sources ==
- Browning, Christopher R. (2017). "Undersecretary Martin Luther: Defender of Foreign Office Prerogatives". In Jasch, Hans-Christian; Kreutzmüller, Christoph (eds.). The Participants: The Men of the Wannsee Conference. New York: Berghahn Books. ISBN 978-1-785-33671-3.
- Browning, Christopher R. (1977). "Unterstaatssekretär Martin Luther and the Ribbentrop Foreign Office". Journal of Contemporary History. 12 (2): 313–44. doi:10.1177/002200947701200206. JSTOR 260219.
- Noks, Robert Jan (2023). Martin Luther in Traces of War.
