= Dinosaur Interplanetary Gazette =

The Dinosaur Interplanetary Gazette (D.I.G.), founded July 4, 1996, was an online science magazine, and arguably the first continuously published online science magazine. The founder-publisher was Edward Summer. The webzine was hosted by Interport, an early ISP in New York City that was eventually taken over by RCN.

The Dinosaur Interplanetary Gazette covered news related to all the sciences, but paleontology and dinosaurs in particular.

== Awards and readership ==
Although it was originally intended for younger readers, the style of writing was accessible to readers of all ages. The publication received mail from readers in more than 159 countries. In July 2006 the magazine claimed to have readers in 175 countries.

Over the initial five years of publication, it was recognized with more than 30 awards. It was recommended by the National Education Association (NEA) along with only one other science site published by Bill Nye The Science Guy. It was a featured website in Netscape, The New York Times, Natural History Magazine.

== Website ==
D.I.G. was one of the earliest websites to run continuous "public appearances" by working scientists. Organized through early message boards, a feature called "The Bone Zone" allowed famous paleontologists to receive and answer questions from the magazine's readers. More than two dozen paleontologists, writers, artists and journalists participated.

== Celluloid Dinosaurs ==
One of the most enduring features of The Dinosaur Interplanetary Gazette was Celluloid Dinosaurs, which examined the history of dinosaur movies, and of the related arts and sciences. The feature took the viewpoint that dinosaurs as portrayed in movies like Jurassic Park or King Kong are a product of the collaboration of many different sciences and literary disciplines.

This feature has been cited in university level textbooks and standard reference works in the field of paleontology.
