= Kittler =

Kittler is a surname. Notable people with the surname include:

- Friedrich Kittler (1943–2011), German literary scholar and media theorist
- Philipp Kittler (1861–1944), German sculptor
- Régis Kittler (born 1979), French footballer
- Regina Kittler (born 1955), German politician

== See also ==
- Kistler (surname)
- Kitler (The Cat who looked like Adolf Hitler)
