= Savidor =

Savidor may refer to:

- Menachem Savidor, Israeli politician
- Tel Aviv Savidor Central Railway Station
