= Toothbrush moustache =

Style of moustache

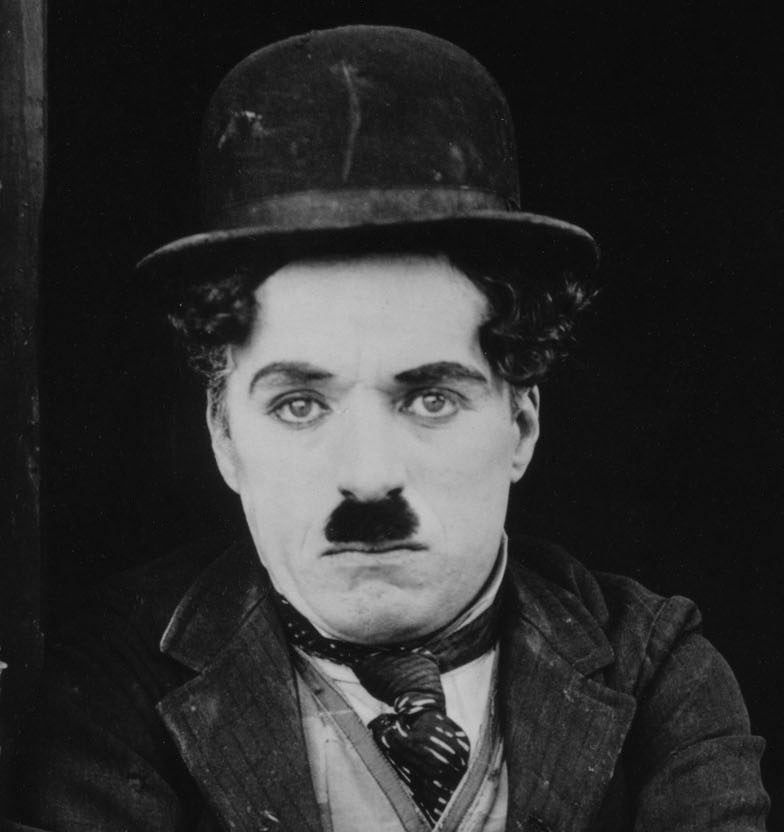
Charlie Chaplin (pictured in 1921 as the Tramp) thought the moustache gave him a comical appearance.

The toothbrush moustache is a style of moustache in which the sides are vertical (or nearly so), often approximating the width of the nose and visually resembling the bristles on a toothbrush. First becoming popular in the United States in the late 19th century, it later spread to Germany and elsewhere. Comedians such as Charlie Chaplin and Oliver Hardy popularized it, reaching its heyday during the interwar years. By the end of World War II, the association with Nazi leader Adolf Hitler made it controversial, leading to it being colloquially termed the 'Hitler moustache' or "Hitler Stash".

After World War II, toothbrush variants were fashioned by a small number of notable people, e.g. American real-estate developer Fred Trump (who sported a split variant) and former president of Zimbabwe Robert Mugabe (covering only the philtrum). Remaining strongly associated with Hitler over subsequent decades, the style was used satirically in works of popular culture and political imagery, including motion pictures, comic books, and 1970s-era rock and roll.

== 19th century–World War II ==
=== In the United States ===
The toothbrush originally became popular in the late 19th century, in the United States. It was a neat, uniform, low-maintenance moustache that echoed the standardization and uniformity brought on by industrialization, in contrast to the more flamboyant styles typical of the 19th century such as the imperial, walrus, handlebar, horseshoe, and pencil moustaches.

English comic actor Charlie Chaplin was one of the most famous wearers of the toothbrush style. Shortly after wearing a full moustache for his 1914 film debut (Making a Living for Southern California's Keystone Studios), he sported a prop toothbrush moustache for his first film as the Tramp, Mabel's Strange Predicament (though Kid Auto Races at Venice was the first released). After selecting a wardrobe, he added a moustache after recalling that producer Mack Sennett was expecting him to be older; Chaplin felt that the toothbrush had a comical appearance and was small enough not to hide his expression. (Note: Chaplin said in 1933: "It all came about in an emergency. The cameraman said put on some funny make-up, and I hadn't the slightest idea what to do. I went to the dress department and decided I wanted everything to be a mass of contradictions. So I took a bowler hat, an abnormally tight jacket, an abnormally loose pair of trousers, and some dirty, raggedy shoes. This was who I wanted my character to be; raggedy but, at the same time, a gentleman. I didn't know how I was going to do the face, but it was going to be a sad, serious face. I wanted to hide that it was comic, so I took a little toothbrush mustache. ... It doesn't hide my expression, after all.") Within a few years of the Tramp's debut, the look was being copied; by 1920, Chaplin allegedly entered and lost a Chaplin look-alike contest, having omitted his signature moustache. Chaplin incorporated the noted similarity between the Tramp and Nazi Party leader Adolf Hitler (Note: Upon first seeing Hitler in newsreels, Chaplin assumed that his look alluded to the Tramp.) in his 1940 film The Great Dictator, playing both a Tramp-like Jewish barber and a parody of Hitler. This was Chaplin's final appearance with the moustache.

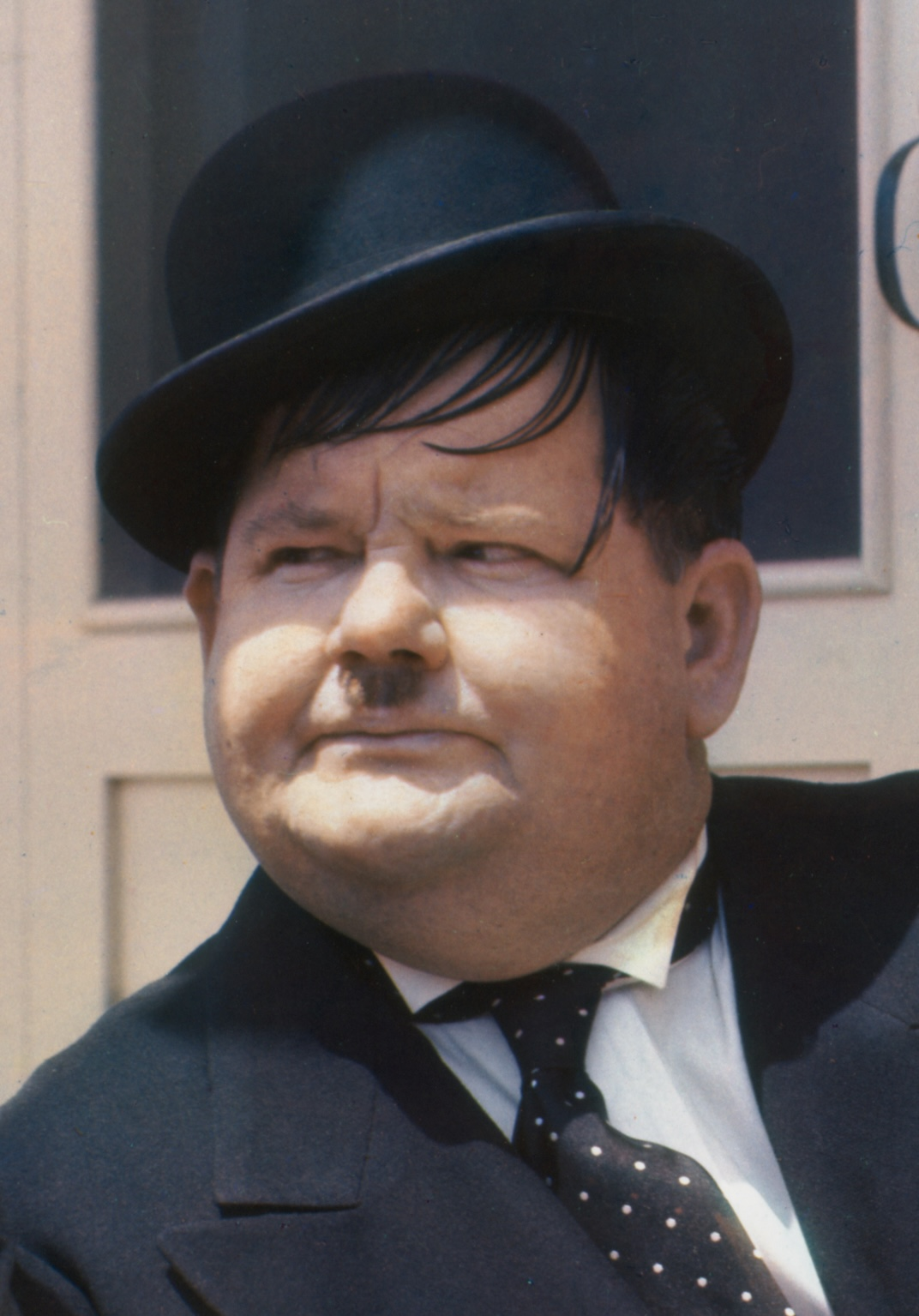
Comedian Oliver Hardy's defining toothbrush (1938)

Prominent American animation producer Max Fleischer wore a toothbrush moustache c. 1919. Comedian Oliver Hardy also adopted the moustache, using it at least as early as the 1921 film The Lucky Dog. American actor Fred Kelsey flaunted a toothbrush c. 1925–1939, (Note: Kelsey's guise was spoofed in the 1943 Tex Avery cartoon Who Killed Who?.) while in the mid-1930s bit-part player Brooks Benedict thickened his mid-moustache, evoking the toothbrush style (flanked by pencil-thin sides). Although Groucho Marx wore a larger moustache, novelty Groucho glasses (sold c. 1940s) often elicit the toothbrush. It has been occasionally claimed that American film producer Walt Disney donned a toothbrush, but his nose-width moustache lacked the characteristic steep sides. Frank Churchill, composer for a number of Disney films, sometimes styled one.

San Francisco mayor (and later California governor) James Rolph and Los Angeles mayor Frank L. Shaw sported toothbrushes in the 1920s and 1930s, as did Washington state governor Clarence D. Martin in the 1930s. American real-estate developer Fred Trump, the father of U.S. president Donald Trump, sported a variant (exposing his lower philtrum) as early as 1936, including in some apparent photomanipulations. The moustache appeared on some members of the German American Bund during a 1937 New York City parade. A number of associates of American condiment company Heinz were photographed wearing toothbrushes in 1940 (at a convention in Quebec). A split variant appears on a spoof of Hitler in Tex Avery's 1942 cartoon Blitz Wolf.

=== In Germany ===
The toothbrush moustache was introduced to Germany in the late 19th century by visiting Americans. Previously, the most popular style was the imperial moustache, also known as the "Kaiser moustache", which was perfumed and turned up at the ends, as worn by German emperor Wilhelm II. By 1907, enough Germans were wearing the toothbrush moustache to elicit notice by The New York Times under the headline "'TOOTHBRUSH' MUSTACHE; German Women Resent Its Usurpation of the [Kaiser moustache]". The toothbrush was taken up by German automobile racer and folk hero Hans Koeppen in the famous 1908 New York to Paris Race, cementing its popularity among young gentry. Koeppen was described as "Six-feet in height, slim, and athletic, with a toothbrush mustache characteristic of his class, he looks the ideal type of the young Prussian guardsman." By the end of World War I, even some of the German royals were sporting the toothbrush; Crown Prince Wilhelm can be seen with a toothbrush moustache in a 1918 photograph that shows him about to be sent into exile. It was also fashioned by German Social Democratic politician and two-time chancellor of Germany (1920, 1928–1930) Hermann Müller, as well as German serial killer Peter Kürten (1883–1931), who eventually reduced it to only the philtrum.

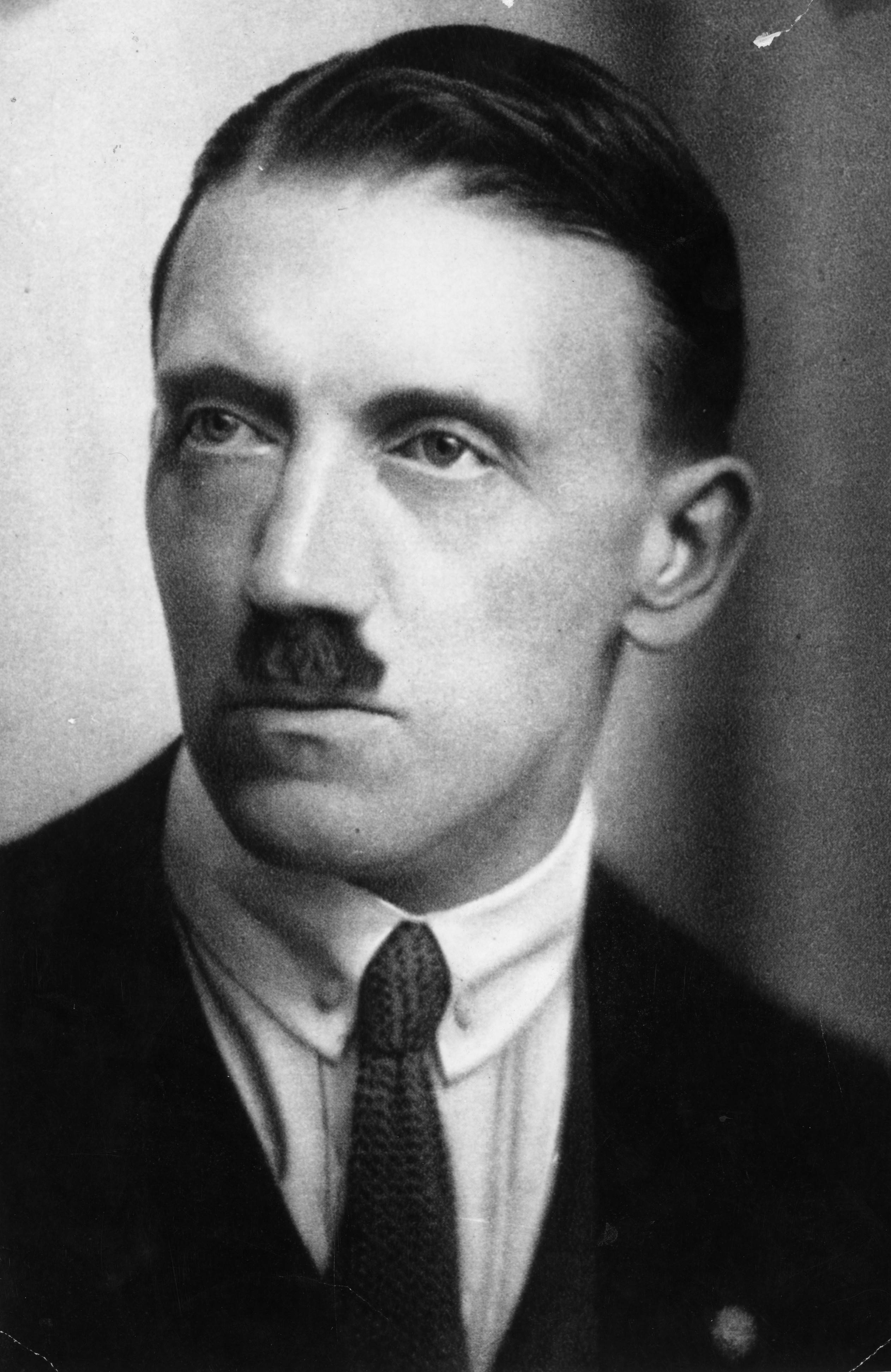
Adolf Hitler in 1923; his appearance was so defined by his moustache that it became unfashionable by the end of WWII.

There are dubious claims that Adolf Hitler began wearing the toothbrush prior to the early 1920s (when it was first reliably documented). His sister-in-law, Bridget Hitler, tenuously claimed that he spent the winter of 1912–13 at her home in Liverpool, England, during which time the two quarrelled, mostly because she could not stand his Kaiser moustache; she reputedly persuaded him to cut it, resulting in him fashioning a toothbrush. A 1914 photograph by Heinrich Hoffmann purports to show Hitler with a toothbrush, but this was probably doctored to serve as Nazi propaganda. As evidenced by photographs, Hitler wore the Kaiser moustache as a soldier during WWI. Author Alexander Moritz Frey, who served as a medic in the same regiment as Hitler, claimed that the latter donned the toothbrush in the trenches after he was ordered to trim his moustache to facilitate the wearing of a gas mask; although Frey's story is unproven, Hitler indeed had a blinding encounter with poison gas during WWI—causing his hospitalization at the war's very end. (Note: The History program The World Wars embellishes the gas-mask story by omitting the commanding officer; executive producer Stephen David claimed that Hitler actually "shaved the mustache while he was in the hospital".) Other sources claim Hitler wore it as early as 1919.

Hitler is generally thought to have incorporated the toothbrush as a trademark of his appearance during the early meetings of the Nazi Party (formed in 1920). According to cultural historian Ron Rosenbaum, "there is no evidence (though some speculation)" that Hitler modelled his moustache on Charlie Chaplin's. In 1923, Hitler's future publicist Ernst Hanfstaengl advised Hitler to lose the toothbrush, to which he replied, "If it is not the fashion now, it will be later because I wear it." Hanfstaengl subsequently adopted the style. In 1932, Hitler wore the toothbrush narrower on bottom. In 1933 (the year Hitler became chancellor), the Nazis began to lambast Chaplin as "non-Aryan" in anti-Semitic propaganda, though Chaplin was not Jewish. According to Hitler's bodyguard Rochus Misch, Hitler "loved" Chaplin films, a number of which he watched at his teahouse near the Berghof (built c. 1936). By the height of World War II, Hitler's toothbrush moustache was such a defining feature of his appearance that it was assumed he would be unrecognizable without it and that he could use this logic to evade capture by the Allies. (Note: According to a postwar report to the FBI, the allegedly escaped Hitler had shaved, with his exposed philtrum suggesting the appearance of buttocks. Chile's probe photographed a ranking man with a philtrum toothbrush (lending a buttlike appearance).) In her posthumous memoir, Hitler's secretary Christa Schroeder (d. 1984) claimed that Hitler said in the mid-1920s that the moustache offset his purportedly oversized nose. His nose was only notably engorged close to the end of WWII.

Politician Anton Drexler, a mentor of Hitler, wore a notched version of the toothbrush. Friedrich Kellner, a Social Democrat who campaigned against Hitler, also wore it. Various notable Nazis sported versions, including Reichsführer-SS Heinrich Himmler, politician Karl Holz, military officer Ernst Röhm and Hitler's chauffeur Julius Schreck.

Near the end of WWII in Europe, on the same day Hitler committed suicide, a U.S. Army private who searched Hitler's Munich apartment found his top hat and used a comb to mimic the moustache in a Chaplin routine from The Great Dictator, to the laughter of his fellow soldiers (as recounted in a book of war stories). In the days after Hitler's death in Berlin, the Soviet Union produced footage of a supposed body double wearing the style—variously invoked in Soviet-bolstered claims that Hitler somehow escaped.

=== Other places ===
Dutch painter Piet Mondrian wore a toothbrush c. 1922. English writer George Orwell wore the style during the 1920s before adapting his more iconic pencil moustache. The toothbrush is worn by the sidekick of English author Agatha Christie's fictional detective Hercule Poirot. Some of Belgian cartoonist Hergé's characters wear it, such as Jo and Zette's father.

German Jew and anti-Nazi activist Alfred Wiener wore a similar style while living in Amsterdam in the mid-1930s. Spanish general Francisco Franco (the dictator of Spain from 1939 to 1975) wore it throughout the 1930s. In a 1936 political cartoon, New Zealand artist David Low portrayed Soviet leader Joseph Stalin forging a toothbrush (along with a regular haircut) to mirror Hitler. On a 1941 poster, Russian artist Dmitry Moor depicted Hitler with a split toothbrush variant.

A Russian-born, Chaplin-influenced clown named Karandash ('the pencil') had a version of it. During World War II, Karandash entertained Soviet troops by mocking the Axis powers. Amongst other Soviet military displays, Commander Pavel Dybenko paired the style with his beard and Major General Hazi Aslanov wore a variant covering only the philtrum.

== Post–World War II ==
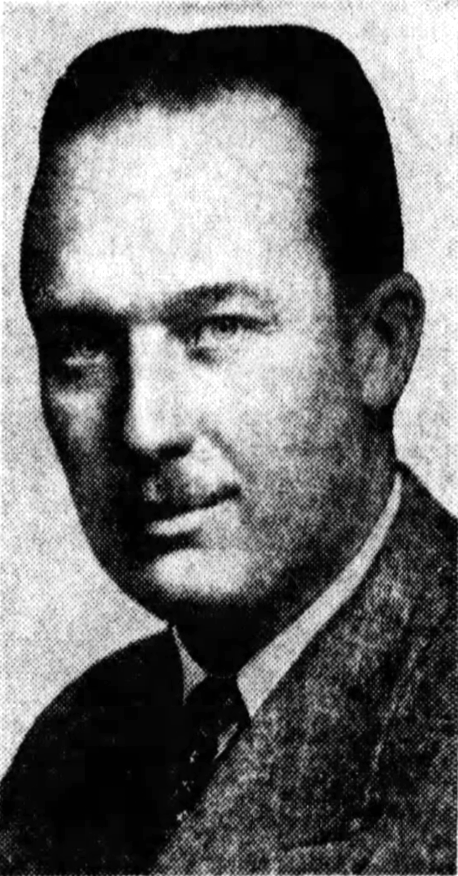
Fred Trump with a split variant c. 1950

By the end of World War II, the toothbrush moustache had fallen out of fashion due to its strong association with Hitler, but it was still worn by the notable individuals Oliver Hardy and (until about 1950) Fred Trump. U.S. and Chile intelligence documented a number of Nazi émigrés with the style in South America in the decade after the war. (Note: A photograph purportedly taken in 1954 in Colombia (northern South America) depicts the supposedly living Hitler with his trademark moustache—possibly only a prop the dictator used in hiding.) It was donned by several politicians of Israel (formed as a state in 1948), some for much of their careers. Hitler's dentist, Hugo Blaschke (d. 1959), wore a similar style, displaying an explicit toothbrush later in life. Armenian Soviet official Anastas Mikoyan upkept a similar style as late as 1962. French railway worker Jean-Marie Loret (b. 1918) donned a toothbrush to publicize his c. 1980 claim of being Hitler's son (since disproven).

After the war, German artist Otto Dix finished his 1933 satirical painting of the seven deadly sins by adding a Hitleresque split toothbrush to a mask worn by Envy. The moustache was utilized in popular cartoons, e.g. Harry Hanan's pantomime comic Louie (1947), which narrates the everyday trials of a domestic loser. It is worn by the father of the titular character of the British comic Dennis the Menace (1951). The moustache also appears in the Warner Bros. cartoons Symphony in Slang (1951; dir. Tex Avery) and The Hole Idea (1955). It appears on a puppet in the 1958 Japanese animated film The White Snake Enchantress (which also features the toothbrush area–omitting Fu Manchu). Caricatures resembling outgrown nasal hair appear in Rocky and Bullwinkle (1959–1964), Osamu Tezuka's Astro Boy (c. 1960s), and The Pink Panther (1964–1980). The early 1960s American animated sitcom The Jetsons features a character with the moustache—George Jetson's boss, Cosmo Spacely. It was worn by Spider-Man character J. Jonah Jameson, created by writer Stan Lee and artist Steve Ditko. (Note: Later in life, Lee trimmed his own moustache nearly down to toothbrush width, ostensibly to keep from tickling his wife.) The style appears in the animated films The Rescuers (1977) and Twice Upon a Time (1983), on an antagonist and a Chaplinesque character, respectively. In a 2002 episode of South Park, a sleeping character is given the style as a prank. The 21st-century graphic memoir The Arab of the Future depicts a toothbrush being worn in the 1980s.

In musical photography, the toothbrush appears (outside of France) on the cover of French composer Michel Legrand's debut album, I Love Paris (1954). American comedian Ray Goulding is caricatured with one on the cover of Bob and Ray's 1958 album, A Stereo Spectacular. In 1967, after omitting Hitler from the cover of Sgt. Pepper's Lonely Hearts Club Band, the Beatles caricatured the style in the Magical Mystery Tour sleeve. John Entwistle, bassist for English band the Who, wore a split moustache omitting the toothbrush area c. 1969. In 1970, Keith Moon, drummer for the Who, donned the toothbrush for a sardonic photo shoot as a Nazi officer (with musician Vivian Stanshall). Around this time, violinist Papa John Creach wore a similar—but less steep—moustache. Roy Loney, co-founder of American rock band Flamin' Groovies, flaunted a toothbrush on the cover of a 1971 live album. Inspired by Chaplin, keyboardist Ron Mael of American band Sparks wore a toothbrush; (Note: Mael maintained a toothbrush throughout most of the 1970s and 1980s.) (Note: Further, the 1982 Sparks song "Moustache" includes the lyrics: "And when I trimmed it very small / My Jewish friends would never call," referencing the association with Hitler. The band once had a booking to perform on a French television show cancelled due to Mael's moustache. In later years, Mael wore a pencil-variant of the toothbrush.) the band gained attention in 1974 with "This Town Ain't Big Enough for Both of Us", featured on British music television series Top of the Pops. While watching this, John Lennon reputedly phoned his former Beatles bandmate Ringo Starr and said he was watching Hitler perform (with the lead singer of T. Rex, to boot). (Note: Before this occurrence, which took place during his so-called "lost weekend" with May Pang, Lennon had demonstrated a fascination with Hitler, e.g. requesting the dictator's inclusion on the cover of Sgt. Pepper's Lonely Hearts Club Band (1967).) (Note: Intelligent Life editor Tim de Lisle gambols that "a whole generation ... saw Ron Mael's moustache, and ran out of the room, crying, 'Mum! Dad! Hitler's playing the piano on "Top of the Pops"!'") The cover of the 1974 debut album by American art-rock band the Residents features a graffitied version of Meet the Beatles! with a toothbrush-moustachioed Lennon. The inner artwork for Billy Joel's Songs in the Attic (1981) spoofs the toothbrush, which can also be found on the cover of The Best of Talking Heads (2004).

In live-action motion pictures, Soviet actor Yevgeny Morgunov wore a toothbrush in the 1967 comedy film Kidnapping, Caucasian Style. The live-action British sitcom On the Buses (1969–1973) features a comedic villain with it, while the British sketch comedy series Monty Python's Flying Circus (1969–1974) invoked it on occasion, most notably on a lunatic class of characters known as Gumbys, who shout stupid phrases and commonly clap bricks; a version appears in 2014's Monty Python Live (Mostly), and in October 2019 (Python's 50th anniversary), a world record was attempted in London for the most people dressed as Gumbys. The 1979 Italian film The Humanoid features an apparent Darth Vader rip-off with a blocky shadow in the toothbrush region. Amongst other spoofs of Hitler in his work, American Jewish comedian Mel Brooks donned the moustache (as Hitler) in the 1983 music video for "The Hitler Rap". (Note: In Brooks's 1967 film The Producers, an actor (in an intentionally bad play) wears the moustache as the primary visual indicator that he is portraying Hitler.) (Note: A woman wears a toothbrush in one shot of the rap video, as an extension of her Nazi chic outfit. Additionally, in Spaceballs (1987), a stunt double for Princess Vespa briefly appears with the moustache.) Michael McKean's character briefly wears it in the American mockumentary This Is Spinal Tap (1984). Between 1985 and 1989, the British children's television drama series Grange Hill featured an authoritarian teacher played by Michael Sheard (who also portrayed Hitler in several productions) with a toothbrush.

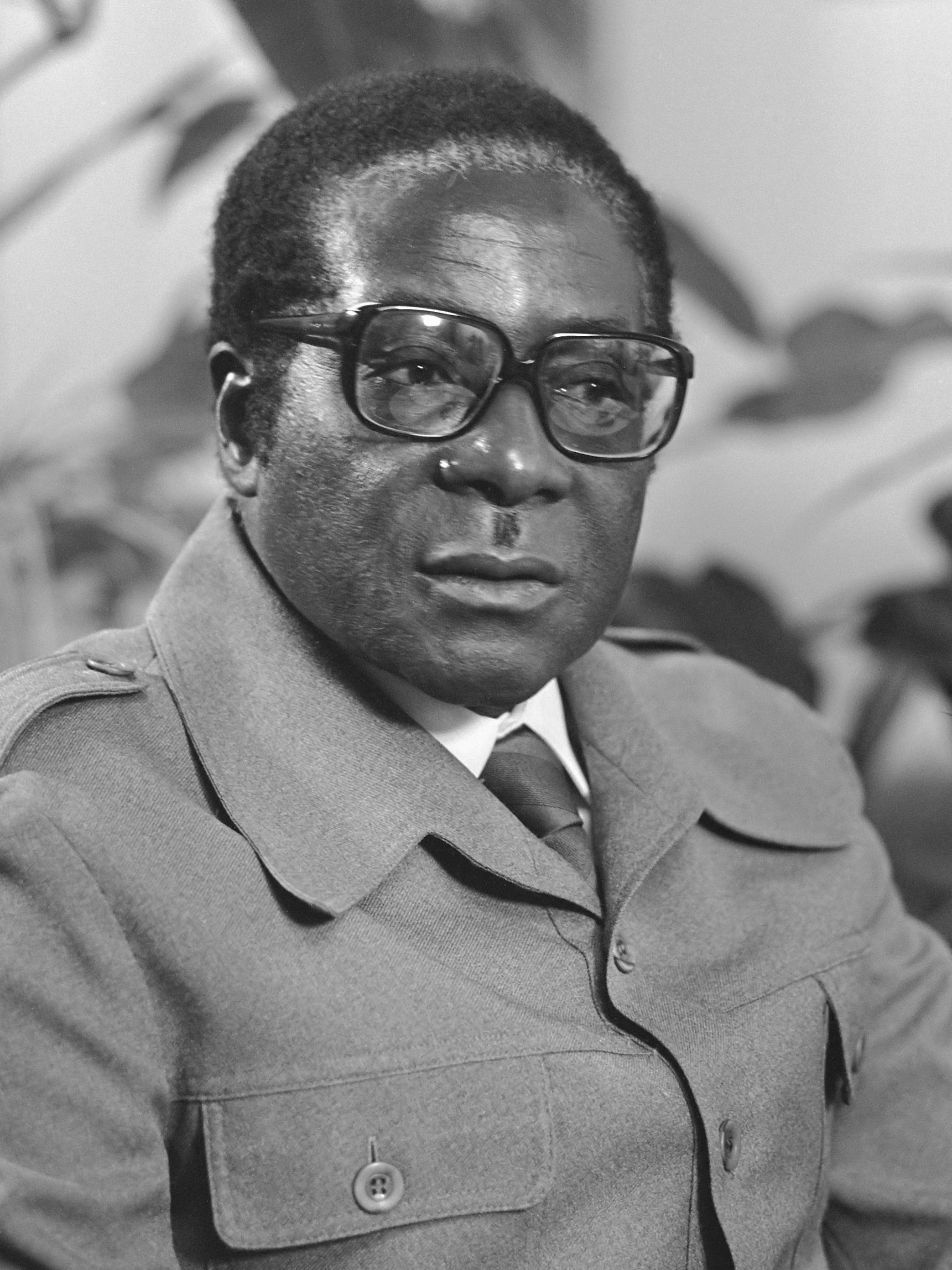
Zimbabwean president Robert Mugabe's philtrum-covering variant

Former Zimbabwean president Robert Mugabe wore a philtrum-only version from as early as 1976 to as late as 2016.

Nirvana lead singer Kurt Cobain jokingly invoked a Hitler moustache via fake eyelashes in a 1992 home movie; this was featured in the 2015 documentary Cobain: Montage of Heck and related promotion. In Léon: The Professional (1994), Natalie Portman wears the style via face paint to mimick Charlie Chaplin. Pop singer Michael Jackson wore it with a Tramp outfit for a 1997 CD single that was cancelled after a limited Austrian release. A villainous character in Harry Potter and the Goblet of Fire (2000) and its film adaptation wears the moustache. It appears on a mad school principal in the animated series Whatever Happened to... Robot Jones?. In Mike Judge's 2006 comedy film Idiocracy, the society of a greatly dumbed-down future believes that Chaplin, not Hitler, led the Nazis. In 2009, English comedian Richard Herring wore the toothbrush for a weeklong stand-up show in an attempt to "reclaim the toothbrush moustache for comedy [because] it was Chaplin's first, then Hitler ruined it".

In May 2010, American basketball star Michael Jordan appeared in a Hanes commercial sporting a hybrid of the toothbrush and pencil moustache, along with a soul patch. This prompted Jordan's friend Charles Barkley to say, "I don't know what the hell he was thinking and I don't know what Hanes was thinking. I mean it is just stupid. It is just bad, plain and simple." The moustache and Jordan's use of it are referenced in a 2015 Key & Peele sketch.

In the Australian comedy series Danger 5 (2012–2015), the titular spies wear a patch with a moustachioed skull during their postwar pursuit of Hitler. A silhouette of the style appears on posters for Hitler-related films such as Look Who's Back (2015) and The Last Laugh (2016), as well as the History Channel investigative series Hunting Hitler (2015–2018; 2020). In a 2016 episode of The Cyanide & Happiness Show, Hitler only shoots off his moustache at the end of WWII, but chokes to death on it decades later. In a 2025 special, Australian-American comedian Jim Jefferies said he sometimes fashioned the style privately to mock Hitler, but did not salute himself.

In 2014, a photograph of Israeli Prime Minister Benjamin Netanyahu and German Chancellor Angela Merkel provoked online amusement due to the former's pointing finger casting a Hitleresque shadow onto the latter's face. Late that year, Southern All Stars frontman Keisuke Kuwata briefly sported a toothbrush moustache during a televised performance, prompting online speculation as to the reason. In 2025, far-right conspiracy theorist Alex Jones flaunted the style while arguing that Democrats are both far too quick to call others Nazis and also are Nazis. Later that same year, while discussing a purported 1954 photograph of Hitler in Colombia, podcaster Joe Rogan suggested that it was incredulous that anyone would don the moustache after WWII.

Into the 21st century, the moustache remained a symbol of satire and protest, maligning people in power perceived to be acting like Hitler. It is also commonly used to allude to Hitler without referencing him by name or to mock him, e.g. in a 2015 book by comedian Nick Offerman and the 2020 drama film Mank. In 2026, a Slovenian magazine depicted Donald Trump with crude oil dripping from his nose, referencing the administration's intervention in Venezuela.

The style remains legal in Germany, despite the country's general ban on Nazi symbols. Some facial-hair-themed websites attempted to reclaim it as acceptable to wear again—especially variations diverging from the strictly rectangular version made famous by Hitler—emphasizing that some notable individuals have worn it. Nevertheless, the toothbrush continued to be widely derided as eliciting the association with Hitler. (Note: A participant in the January 6 U.S. Capitol attack had a toothbrush; in 2021, tech company Amazon changed its app logo following complaints that part of the design—meant to look like tape on a box—resembled a Hitler moustache. In 2022, professional wrestler Nash Carter was fired after a photo surfaced of him wearing a toothbrush and performing a Nazi salute.) (Note: In an episode of the 2023 Scooby-Doo spin-off Velma, rain causes one of Fred's fake eyelashes to swim under his nose in a series of events making him resemble the Nazi dictator.)

== Other notable wearers ==
=== Europe ===
- Dobri Bozhilov (image)
- Michael Collins (image)
- Dragiša Cvetković (image)
- Charles de Gaulle (image)
- Douglas Valder Duff (image)
- Alois Eliáš (image)
- Milan Gutović (image)
- Nestor Makhno (image)
- Ludwig von Mises
- Hermann Obrecht (image)
- Waldemar Pabst (image)
- Wilhelm Pieck
- Marcel Pilet-Golaz (image)
- Francisco Rolão Preto (image)
- Ferdinand Sauerbruch (image)
- Walter H. Schottky (image)
- Kurt Schuschnigg (image)
- Jean Sibelius
- Mehmed Spaho (image)
- Georgios Tsolakoglou
- Adolf Windaus (image)
- Yordan Yovkov (image)
- Szmul Zygielbojm (image)

==== Nazi Germany ====
- Karl Maria Demelhuber (image)
- Sepp Dietrich (image)
- Irmfried Eberl (image)
- August Eigruber (image)
- Hermann Esser (image)
- Gottfried Feder (image)
- Edmund Glaise-Horstenau (image)
- Ernst-Robert Grawitz
- Jakob Grimminger
- Hanns Kerrl (image)
- Erich Koch (image)
- Hans Krebs (image)
- Ernst Kundt (image)
- Hinrich Lohse (image)
- Emil Maurice (image)
- Artur Phleps (image)
- Lothar Rendulic (image)
- Gerd von Rundstedt (image)
- Fritz Sauckel (image)
- Otto Skorzeny (image)
- Julius Streicher (image)
- Franz Ritter von Epp
- Christian Wirth (image)
- Kurt Zeitzler (image)

=== Soviet Union and successor states ===
- Alexander Vasilyevich Alexandrov (image)
- Ivan Bagramyan (image)
- Aleksandr Bezymensky (image)
- Naftaly Frenkel (image)
- Leonid Govorov (image)
- Paolo Iashvili (image)
- Avetik Isahakyan (image)
- Ahmad Javad (image)
- Vladimir Karpov
- Yevhen Konovalets (image)
- Semyon Krivoshein (image)
- Bogdan Kobulov
- Leonid Kubbel (image)
- Grigory Kulik (image)
- Genrikh Lyushkov (image)
- Vasil Mzhavanadze (image)
- Ivan Panfilov (image)
- Roman Ivanovich Panin (image)
- Pavel Rotmistrov (image)
- Minay Shmyryov (image)
- Genrikh Yagoda (image)
- Georgy Zhukov (image)

=== State of Israel ===
- Yitzhak Ben-Aharon (image)
- Eliyahu Dobkin (image)
- Levi Eshkol (image)
- Pinchas Rosen (image)
- Yitzhak Shamir (image)
- Moshe Sharett (image)
- Zalman Shazar (image)
- Yisrael Yeshayahu (image)

=== Other regions ===
- Ferhat Abbas (image)
- Subhi Bey Barakat (image)
- Siad Barre (image)
- Hulusi Behçet
- Gaston Browne (image)
- Abdalá Bucaram
- Carlos Castillo Armas (image)
- Arthur Compton (image)
- Charles Culley (image)
- Immanuvel Devendrar (image)
- Edward M. Fram (image)
- Ahmad al-Ghashmi (image)
- Sadegh Hedayat (image)
- Gustavo Jiménez (image)
- Amanullah Khan (image)
- Ghulam Nabi Khan (image)
- Fumimaro Konoe (image)
- Fuat Köprülü (image)
- Frank McGee (image)
- Davud Monshizadeh (image)
- Justin Muturi (image)
- Ihsan Nuri (image)
- Julius Nyerere (image)
- Abdul Karim Qassem (image)
- Sayyid Qutb (image)
- R. S. Ramakrishna Ranga Rao (image)
- Mahmud Salman (image)
- Bakr Sidqi (image)
- Rafael Trujillo (image)
- Jōsei Toda (image)

== See also ==
- Cats That Look Like Hitler!
- Hitler teapot
- List of facial hairstyles
