= Kistler =

Kistler may refer to:

== Places ==
- Kistler, Pennsylvania, USA; a borough in Mifflin County
- Kistler Creek, a tributary of Maiden Creek in Berks County, Pennsylvania, USA
- Kistler House, Newton, Massachusetts, USA; an NRHP-listed building
- Kistler Valley (disambiguation), two locations; Antarctica and Pennsylvania
- Kistler Vineyards, in Sonoma Valley, California, USA

== Other ==
- Kistler (surname)
- Kistler Group, sensors and sensor electronics for measuring pressure, force, torque and acceleration
- "Kistler Aerospace" and "Kistler Space Systems", predecessor and successor names of Rocketplane Kistler, company attempting to develop fully reusable vehicles
- Kistler Prize (1999-2011)
