= Kiryat Sprinzak =

Coordinates: 32°49′15.6″N 34°57′42.5″E

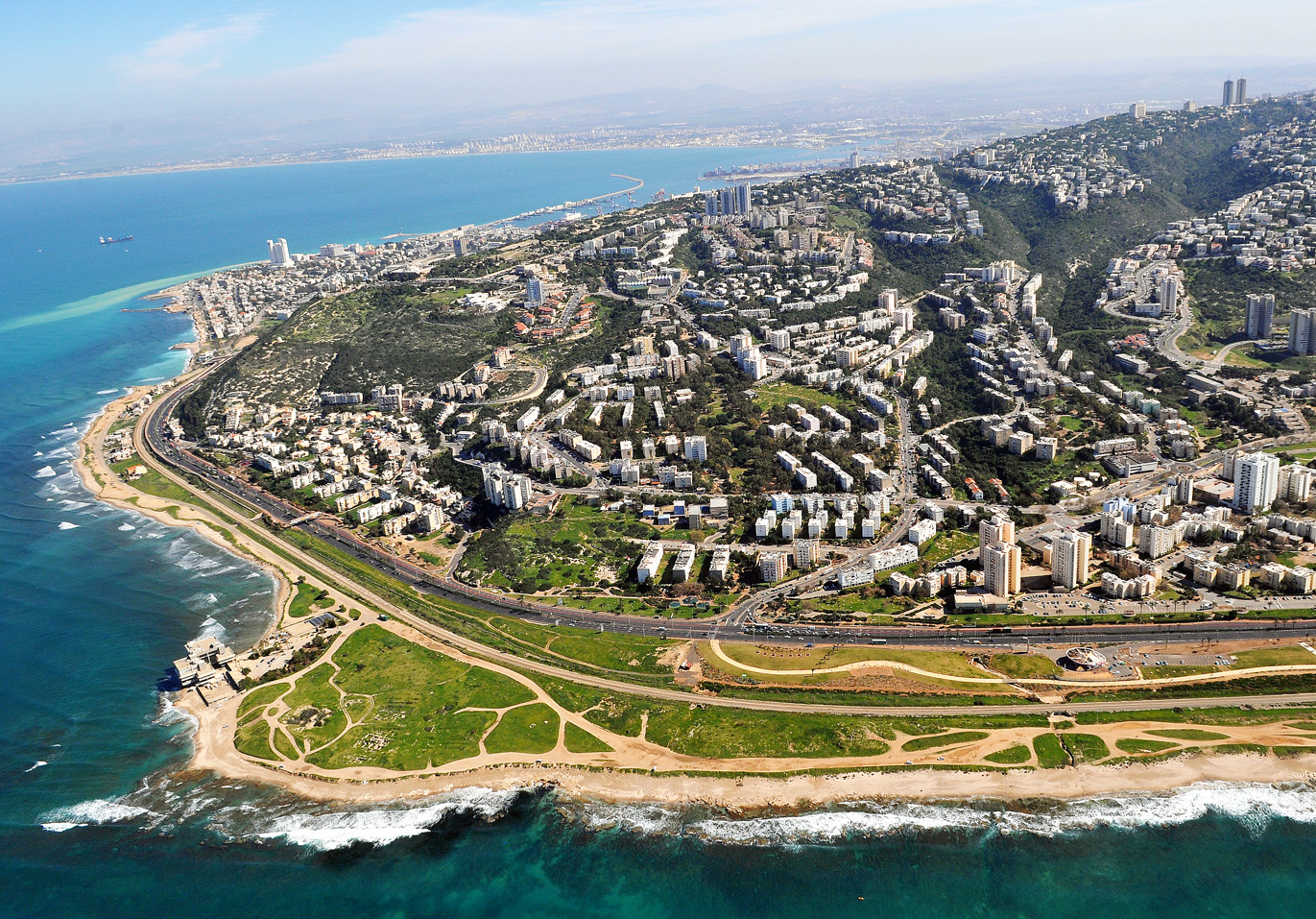
Mount Carmel touching the sea - Kiryat Sprinzak and Ein HaYam neighbourhoods, with Hecht Park (bottom right)

Kiryat Sprinzak, sometimes spelled as Shprintzak, is a neighbourhood in Haifa, to the south of Mount Carmel's headland, along the road to Tel Aviv.

== History ==
Kiryat Sprinzak was established in the 1960s. It is named after Yosef Sprinzak.

== Nowadays ==
The neighbourhood is full of typical houses from the period of liquidation of the temporary housing. The neighborhood initially included 1,600 housing units. The population in the neighborhood is mixed, and today there are immigrants from Ethiopia, immigrants from the former Soviet Union and veteran residents. In the past, the Sprinzak elementary school operated in the neighborhood, but it was closed in 2003 due to a lack of students and a poor level of education. Today the neighborhood served by Ein Hayam elementary school, which also includes a class for children with PDD.
