= Regina Kittler =

German politician

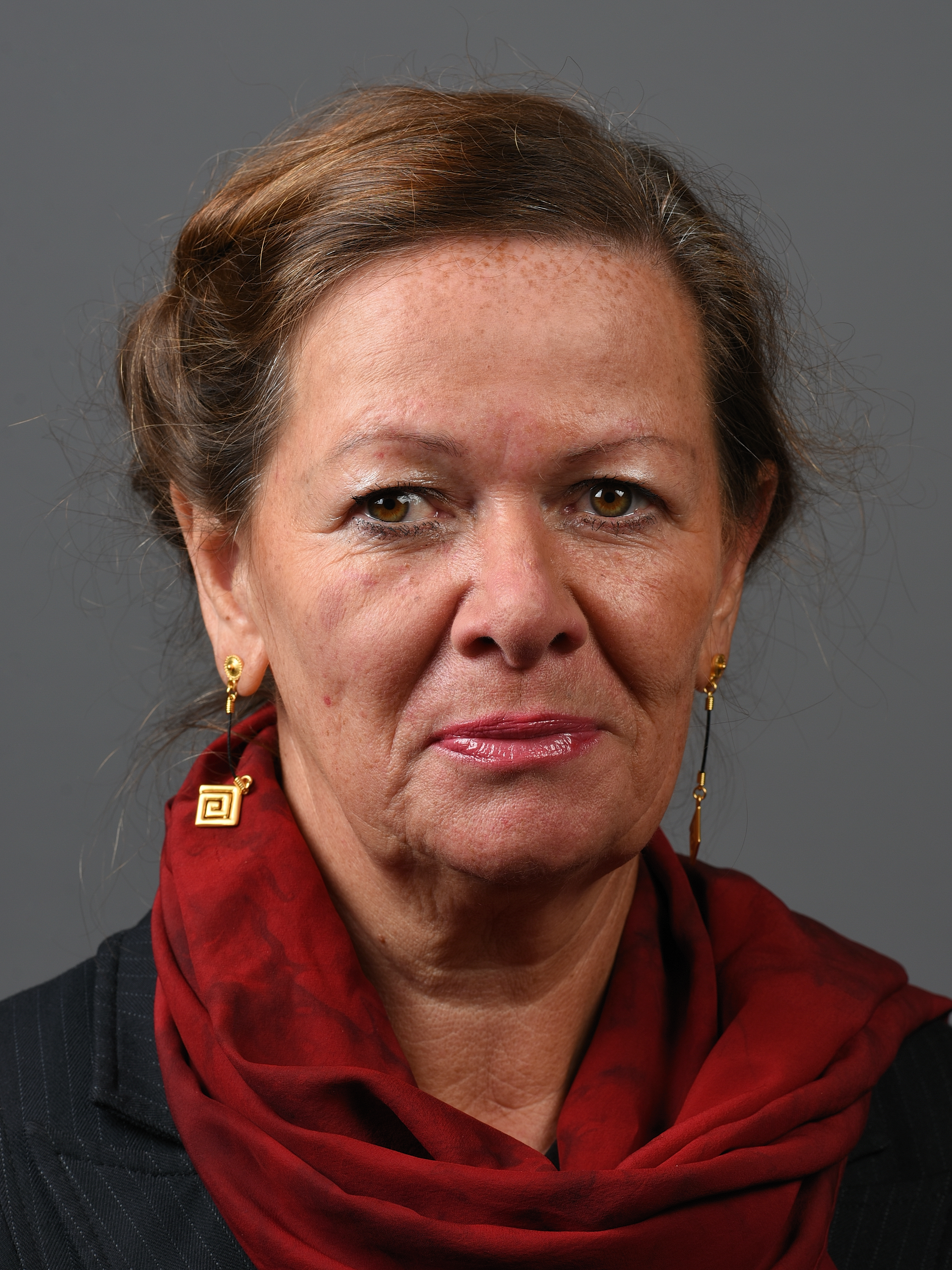
- Regina Kittler in 2017

Member of the Abgeordnetenhaus of Berlin
- Incumbent
- Assumed office 2 December 2025
- In office 2011–2021

Personal details
- Born: 16 September 1955 (age 71) Halle (Saale), Germany
- Party: Die Linke
- Other political affiliations: PDS (former)

Regina Kittler (born 16 September 1955) is a German politician from Die Linke. She has been a member of the Abgeordnetenhaus of Berlin again since 2025, having previously served from 2011 to 2021.

== Biography ==
Kittler grew up in Prenzlauer Berg. After graduating from the "Paul Oestreich" Extended Secondary School in Berlin-Weißensee in 1974, she studied pedagogy (teaching degree in mathematics and geography) at the Dresden University of Education until 1978. From 1978 to 2011, she worked as a teacher in Berlin-Marzahn, and since 2003 as a senior teacher.

She became a member of the SED in 1973. From 1991 to 1998, she was deputy district chairwoman of the PDS Marzahn.

From 1999 to 2011, she was a member of the Marzahn-Hellersdorf District Assembly, where she served as deputy chair of the Left Party parliamentary group and its spokesperson on budgetary policy, as well as chair of the committees on personnel and administration and on housing and transport. She has been a member of the District Assembly again since 2021. She is the spokesperson for education and culture for the Left Party parliamentary group and chair of the Marzahn-Hellersdorf District Assembly's Committee on Continuing Education and Culture.

On 18 September 2011, Kittler was elected to the Abgeordnetenhaus of Berlin for the Left Party, representing the Marzahn-Hellersdorf 4 constituency. There, she served on the Petitions Committee and the Committee on Education, Youth and Family. She was the Left Party's spokesperson on education policy. From March 2014, she was a member of the Left Party's parliamentary group executive committee. In the 2016 Berlin state election, she was elected via her party's state list. She again served on the parliamentary group's executive committee and as spokesperson for education and cultural policy, as well as on the committees for Education/Youth and Culture (substituting for Sports).

She initially failed to win re-election in the 2021 Berlin state election and the repeat election in 2023. On 2 December 2025, she succeeded Katrin Seidel in the House of Representatives.

Kittler has been chairwoman of the Berlin state association of the German Library Association since 2022.
