= Speaker of the Knesset =

Presiding officer of the Knesset

- Hebrew: יוֹשֵׁב רֹאשׁ הכנסת; Arabic: رئيس الكنيست

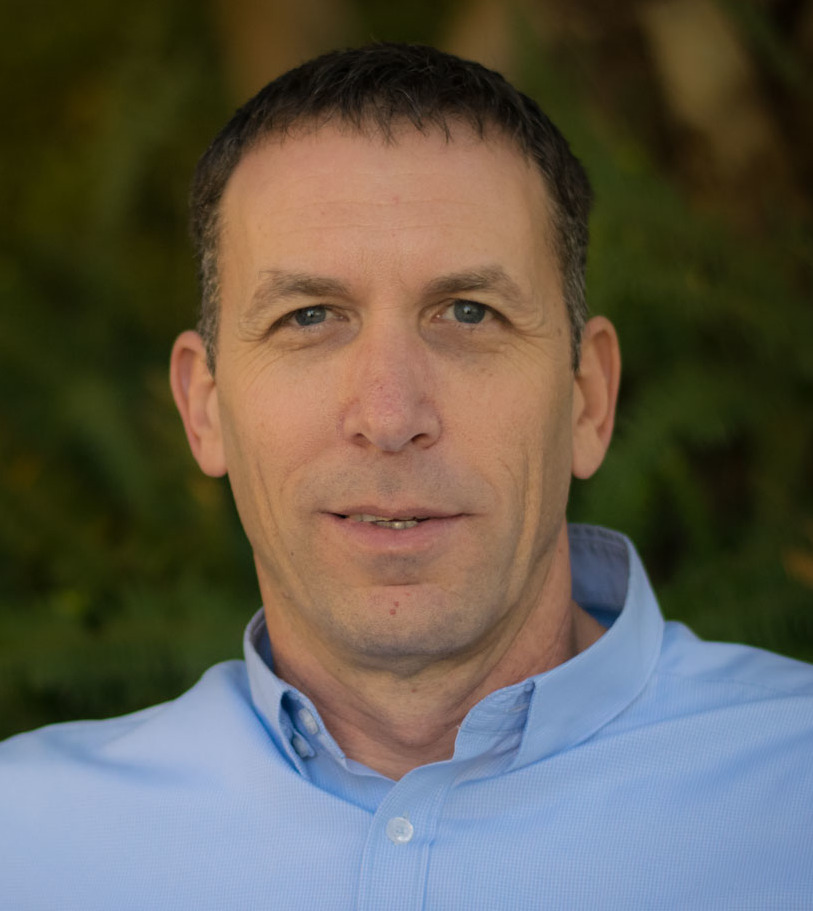
- Incumbent; Matan Kahana since 17 November 2026
- Seat: Jerusalem
- Appointer: Knesset
- Formation: 14 February 1949
- First holder: Yosef Sprinzak
- Website: Knesset

The speaker of the Knesset (Hebrew: יוֹשֵׁב רֹאשׁ הכנסת, romanized: Yoshev Rosh HaKnesset; Arabic: رئيس الكنيست, romanized: Ra'īs Al-Kinisit, lit. 'Chairman of the Knesset') is the presiding officer of the Knesset, the unicameral legislature of Israel. The speaker also acts as president of Israel when the president is incapacitated. The current speaker is Matan Kahana, who was elected on 17 November 2026.

== Position ==
The Speaker and their deputies are elected by members of the Knesset. Until a Speaker is elected, the previous Knesset's speaker serves as acting speaker; however, if the previous Knesset's speaker has not been re-elected, the oldest Knesset member who is not the prime minister, the prime minister-elect, a minister or deputy minister serves as acting speaker instead.

The Speaker is responsible for conducting the affairs of the Knesset and representing the Knesset. They are also charged with preserving the dignity of the Knesset, the decorum of its sittings and observance of Knesset rules of procedure.

The Speaker is assisted by a number of Deputy Speakers. Together, the Speaker and Deputy Speakers constitute the Presidium of the Knesset. The Presidium sets the Knesset agenda.

Ahdut HaAvoda's Nahum Nir and Blue & White's Benny Gantz are the only Speakers not to have come from the ruling party, though in two cases (Avraham Burg and Reuven Rivlin) the party of the speaker (One Israel and Likud respectively) lost power during their term.

The Speaker is expected to act in a non-partisan nature, but may occasionally take part in debates, and is allowed to vote.

== List of Knesset speakers ==
A total of twenty one people have served as Speaker of the Knesset, two of whom, Reuven Rivlin and Yariv Levin, have served two non-consecutive terms.

Speaker						Knesset
No.	Portrait	Name (Lifespan)	Term of office		Political party	Knesset
1		Yosef Sprinzak (1885–1959)	14 February 1949	28 January 1959	Mapai	1, 2, 3
2		Nahum Nir (1884–1968)	2 March 1959	30 November 1959	Ahdut HaAvoda	3
3		Kadish Luz (1895–1972)	30 November 1959	17 November 1969	Mapai, Alignment	4, 5, 6
4		Reuven Barkat (1906–1972)	17 November 1969	5 April 1972	Alignment	7
5		Yisrael Yeshayahu (1908–1979)	9 May 1972	13 June 1977	Alignment	7, 8
6		Yitzhak Shamir (1915–2012)	13 June 1977	10 March 1980	Likud	9
7		Yitzhak Berman (1913–2013)	12 March 1980	20 July 1981	Likud	9
8		Menachem Savidor (1917–1988)	20 July 1981	13 August 1984	Likud	10
9		Shlomo Hillel (1923–2021)	11 September 1984	20 November 1988	Alignment	11
10		Dov Shilansky (1924–2010)	21 November 1988	13 July 1992	Likud	12
11		Shevah Weiss (1935–2023)	13 July 1992	24 June 1996	Labor	13
12		Dan Tichon (1937–2024)	24 June 1996	7 June 1999	Likud	14
13		Avraham Burg (born 1955)	6 July 1999	17 February 2003	One Israel, Labor	15
14		Reuven Rivlin (born 1939)	19 February 2003	4 May 2006	Likud	16
15		Dalia Itzik (born 1952)	4 May 2006	30 March 2009	Kadima	17
(14)		Reuven Rivlin (born 1939)	30 March 2009	5 February 2013	Likud	18
16		Yuli Edelstein (born 1958)	18 March 2013	25 March 2020	Likud	19, 20, 21, 22
17		Benny Gantz (born 1959)	26 March 2020	17 May 2020	Blue & White	23
18		Yariv Levin (born 1969)	17 May 2020	13 June 2021	Likud	23
19		Mickey Levy (born 1951)	13 June 2021	13 December 2022	Yesh Atid	24
(18)		Yariv Levin (born 1969)	13 December 2022	29 December 2022	Likud	25
20		Amir Ohana (born 1976)	29 December 2022	17 November 2026	Likud	25
21		Matan Kahana (born 1972)	17 November 2026	Incumbent	Yashar	26
