= Katrin Seidel =

German politician

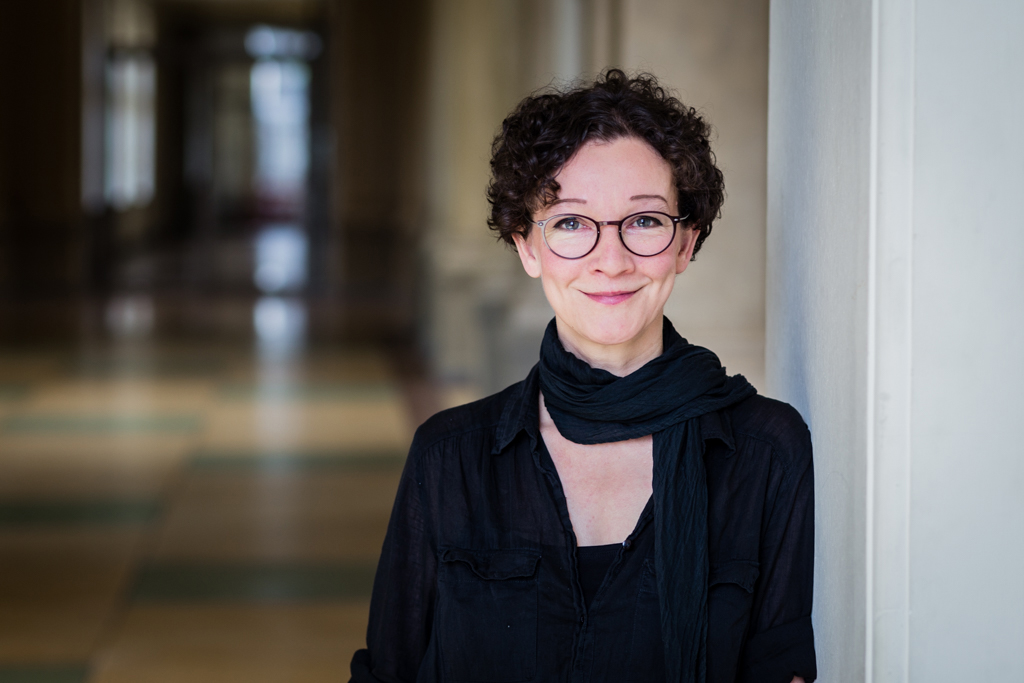
- Katrin Seidel in 2022

Member of the Abgeordnetenhaus of Berlin
- In office 2011–2025

Personal details
- Born: 11 May 1967 (age 59) Grevesmühlen, Germany
- Party: Die Linke
- Education: Technische Universität Berlin

Katrin Seidel (formerly Möller; born 11 May 1967) is a German politician (Die Linke). From 2011 to 2025 she was a member of the Berlin House of Representatives.

== Biography ==
Katrin Seidel attended the Polytechnic Secondary School (POS) in Rostock until 1983 and then the Teacher Training College in Schwerin. After graduating, Seidel initially worked as a kindergarten teacher in Greifswald and Rostock until 1992, after which she ran her own café in Greifswald. From 1995, Seidel studied educational science and social pedagogy at the Technical University of Berlin, graduating with a diploma in education. Alongside her studies, she worked for a music publisher and a concert agency. From 2003 to 2011, Seidel worked as a social worker for a non-profit organization in Berlin, providing family support and supervised housing for children and young people. She was also active as a works council member and in the trade union.

In 2005, Katrin Seidel became a member of the WASG and, after the merger, of the left-wing party Die Linke. From 2007 to 2013, she was deputy state chair in Berlin. In the 2011 Berlin state election, Seidel was elected to the Berlin House of Representatives. She retained her seat in the 2016 election, the 2021 election, and the 2023 repeat election. On 1 December 2025, she resigned her seat, and Regina Kittler succeeded her by taking her vacated seat in the House of Representatives.

From 2014 to 2021, Seidel was a member of the executive committee of the Left Party parliamentary group in the Berlin House of Representatives, and from 2017 to 2021 she served as deputy parliamentary group leader. She was a member of the Committee on Education, Youth and Family, the Committee on the Environment, Consumer Protection and Climate Protection, and the Committee on Civic Engagement, Federal Affairs and Media. For her parliamentary group, she was the spokesperson for children, youth and family, consumer protection, and animal welfare.

From 2016 to 2019, Katrin Seidel was a member of the state executive committee of Die Linke Berlin. In 2022, she was elected to the district executive committee of her party in Pankow.
