= Yitzhak Berman =

Israeli politician (1913–2013)

- יצחק ברמן
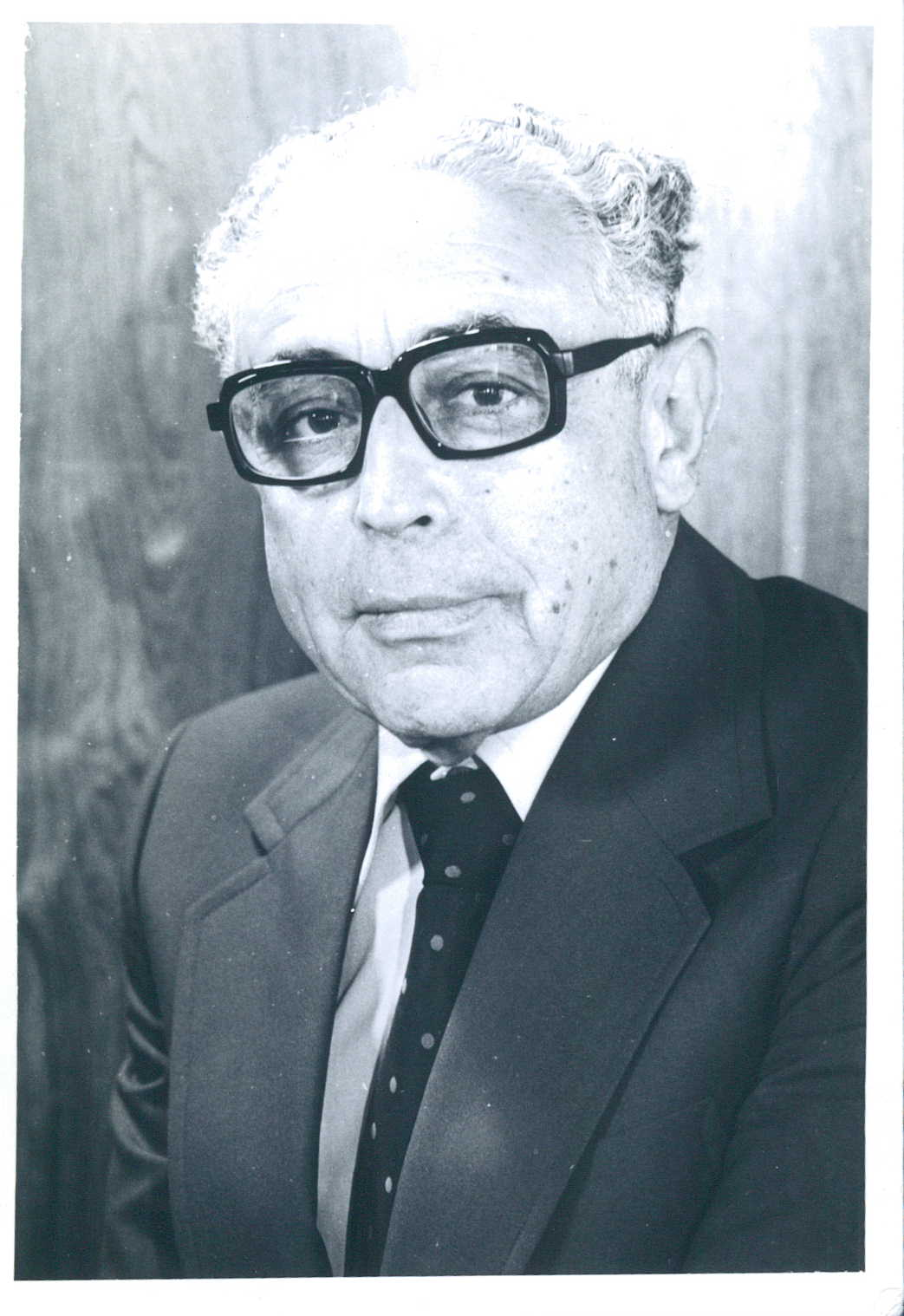
- Berman as Knesset member

Speaker of the Knesset
- In office 12 March 1980 – 20 July 1981
- Preceded by: Yitzhak Shamir
- Succeeded by: Menachem Savidor

Ministerial roles
- 1981–1982: Minister of Energy & Infrastructure

Faction represented in the Knesset
- 1977–1984: Likud

Personal details
- Born: 3 June 1913 Berdychiv, Russian Empire
- Died: 4 August 2013 (aged 100) Tel Aviv, Israel

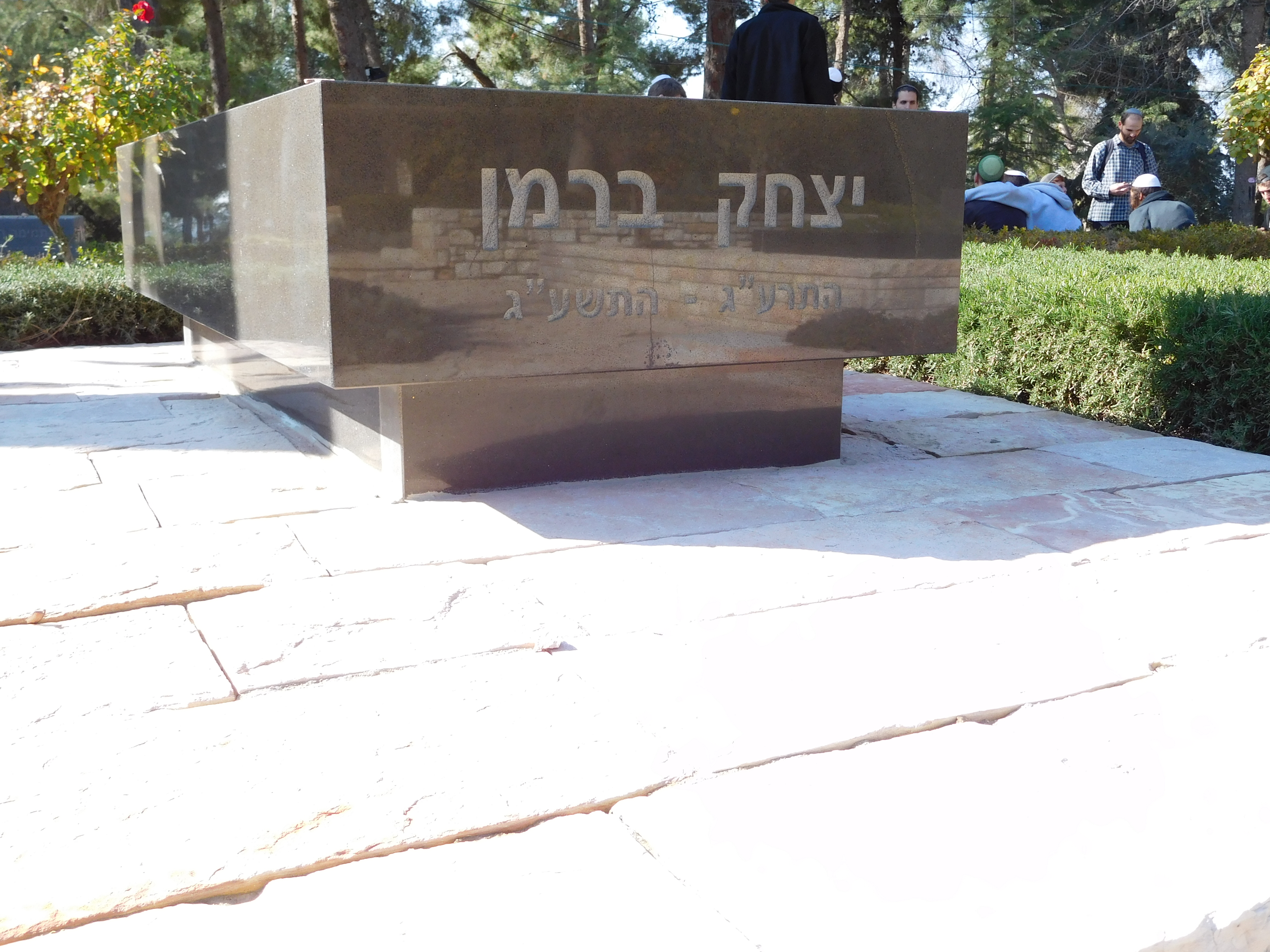
Berman's grave at Mount Herzl

Yitzhak Berman (Hebrew: יצחק ברמן; 3 June 1913 – 4 August 2013) was an Israeli politician who served as Minister of Energy and Infrastructure from August 1981 until September 1982. He was also Speaker of the Knesset from 1980 until 1981.

== Biography ==
Born in Berdychiv in the Kiev Governorate of the Russian Empire (present-day Ukraine), Berman emigrated to Mandate Palestine in 1920. He studied at a teacher training college in Jerusalem, before studying to be a lawyer in London.

In 1939 he joined the Irgun and worked in the organisation's intelligence department. In 1941, during World War II, he enlisted in the British Army and served in intelligence. He also served in the Israel Defense Forces between 1948 and 1950, fighting in the 1948 Arab-Israeli War.

In 1950 he began work as the legal advisor of the Kaiser-Fraizier Factory in Haifa, becoming Director General by the time he left in 1954. In 1951 he joined the General Zionists and became chairman of the party's Tel Aviv branch in 1964. In 1974 he became chairman of the party's national secretariat, and in 1977 elections was voted into the Knesset on the list of Likud (of which the General Zionists had become a faction). After being re-elected in 1981 he was appointed Minister of Energy and Infrastructure in Menachem Begin's government. However, he resigned from the post on 30 September 1982 due to the government's attitude towards the Kahan Commission, which was investigating the Sabra and Shatila massacre.

Berman lost his seat in the 1984 elections. In 1986 he was amongst the founders of the Centre Liberal Party, and the following year was one of the founders of the Centre Party (unrelated to the later Centre Party).

He lived his last years in a retirement home in Tel Aviv. After turning 100 in June 2013, he died in Tel Aviv on 4 August 2013 and was buried at Mount Herzl in Jerusalem.
