= Kistler Valley =

Kistler Valley may refer to:

- Kistler Valley (Antarctica) in the Dufek Massif, Pensacola Mountains, Antarctica
- Kistler Valley, in Berks County, Pennsylvania, United States; see Lynton Richards Kistler
- Kistler Valley Road, Albany Township, Berks County, Pennsylvania, United States
- Kistler Valley, Lynn Township, Pennsylvania, United States; in Lehigh County

== See also ==
- Kistler (disambiguation)
