= Yosef Sprinzak =

Israeli politician (1885–1959)

- יוֹסֵף שְׁפְּרִינְצָק
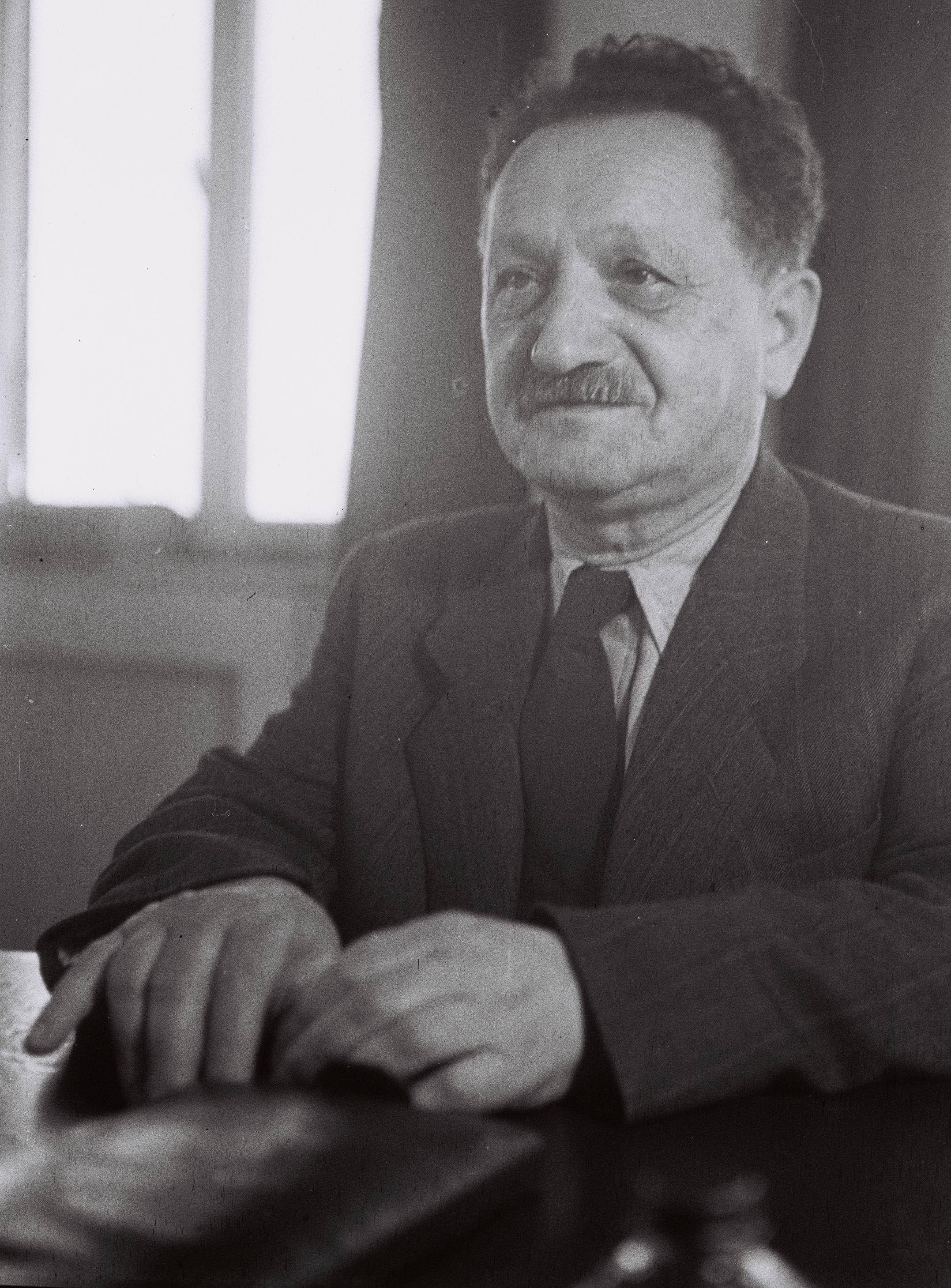

Acting President of Israel
- In office 9 November 1952 – 16 December 1952
- Prime Minister: David Ben-Gurion
- Preceded by: Chaim Weizmann
- Succeeded by: Yitzhak Ben-Zvi

Speaker of the Knesset
- In office 14 February 1949 – 28 January 1959
- Preceded by: Position established
- Succeeded by: Nahum Nir

Faction represented in the Knesset
- 1949–1959: Mapai

Personal details
- Born: 8 December 1885 Moscow, Russian Empire
- Died: 28 January 1959 (aged 73) Jerusalem

Yosef Sprinzak (Hebrew: יוֹסֵף שְׁפְּרִינְצָק; 8 December 1885 – 28 January 1959) was a leading Zionist activist in the first half of the 20th century, an Israeli politician, and the first Speaker of the Knesset, a role he held from 1949 until his death in 1959.

== Biography ==
Yosef Sprinzak was born in Moscow, Russia but following the expulsion of Jews in 1891 moved with his family to Kishinev where he was a founder of the Tze'irei Zion (Zion Youth). He began medical school at the American University in Beirut in 1908 and settled in Palestine in 1910, during the Second Aliyah (1904–1914).

Along with Eliezer Kaplan Sprinzak headed Hapoel Hatzair ("The Young Worker") a Zionist socialist faction formed in 1905 and one of the organisations that consolidated to form Mapai in 1930. Its members were pro-British and supported Chaim Weizmann. He was a founder of the Histadrut in 1920 and acted as secretary general of the organisation from 1945 to 1949.

His son Yair Sprinzak also served in the Knesset. Another son, Aharon David Sprinzak, an Israeli Air Force pilot, was killed in action during the 1948 Arab-Israeli War. His grandson, Ehud Sprinzak (1940–2002) was one of Israel's foremost experts on counterterrorism and far-right Jewish groups.

== Political career ==
Sprinzak was elected to the position of speaker of the provisional parliament on 15 July 1948, a role in which he helped lay the foundations of Israel's parliamentarism. He was elected to the first Knesset in 1949 as a member of Mapai, and became the Speaker of the new body. He was re-elected and remained speaker in both the second and third Knessets.

As part of his role as speaker, Sprinzak became acting President of Israel when Chaim Weizmann fell ill from 12 December 1951. After Weizmann's death on 9 November 1952 Sprinzak served as interim President until inauguration of Yitzhak Ben-Zvi on 10 December 1952.

Among other actions, in 1949 to celebrate the Israel's new parliament, Sprinzak invited Franco-Israeli painter, Yitzhak Frenkel to paint a 50 square meter commemorative painting of the First Knesset. The painting was not completed due to economic and political factors of the Education ministry.

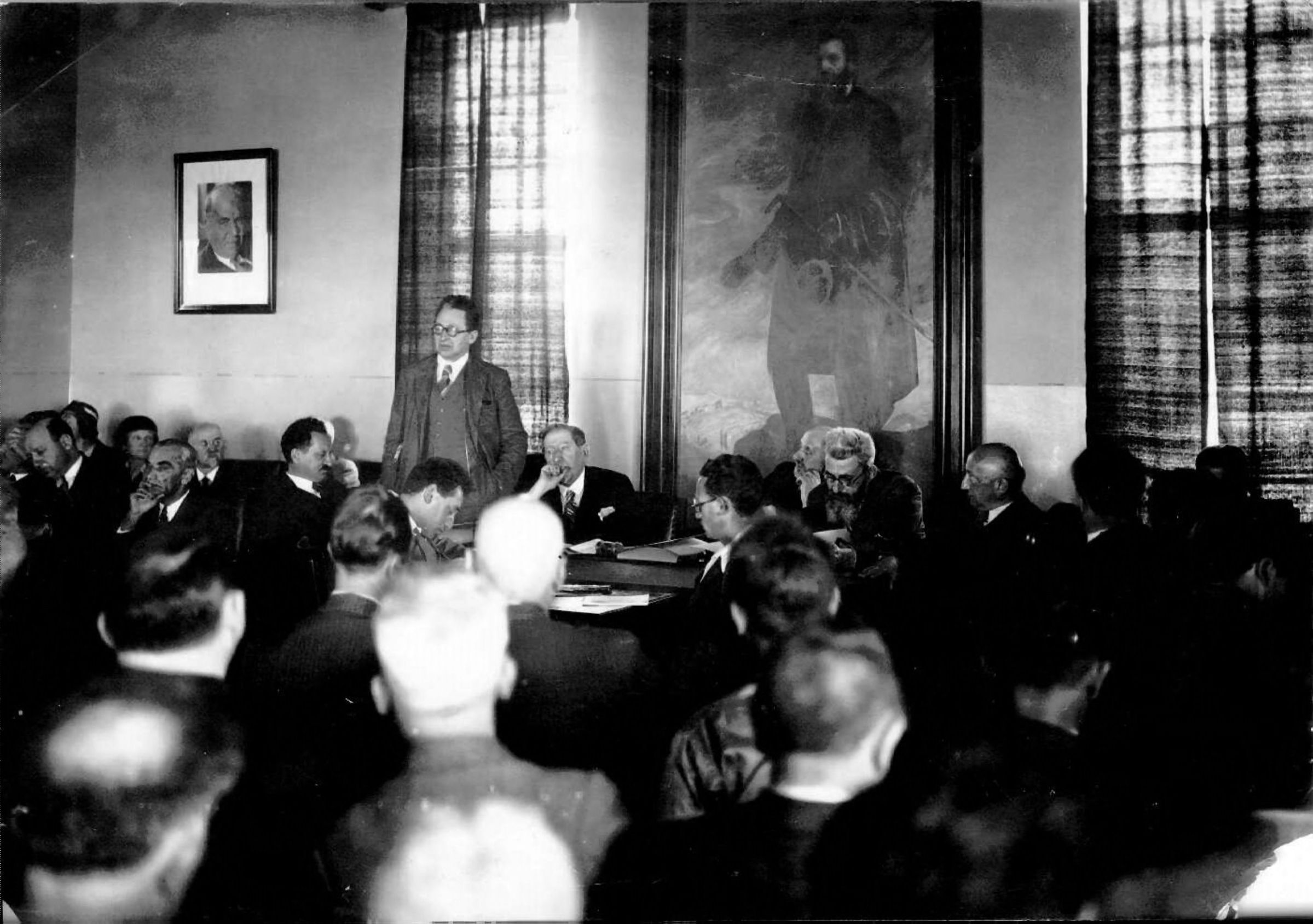
Yitzhak Ben-Zvi, Chairman of the National Committee, addresses the Zionist General Council Meeting in Jerusalem. From right to left: I. Rupaisen, Ben-Zion Mossinson, H. Farbstein, Nahum Sokolow, Yitzhak Ben-Zvi, Yosef Sprinzak, I. L. Goldberg, Shmaryahu Levin, Eliezer Kaplan (1935)

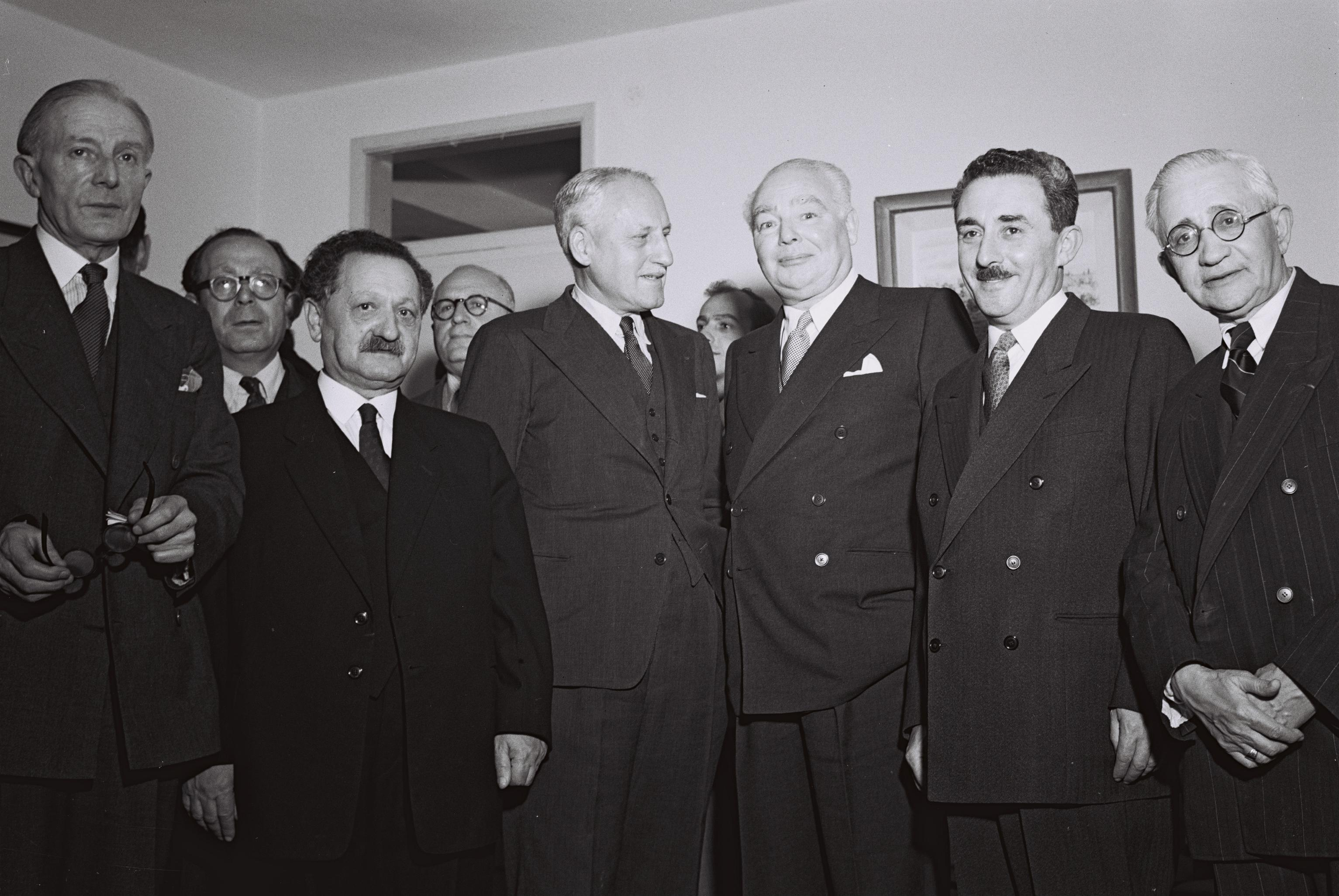
L-R: W. G. Hall, Moshe Rosetti, Yosef Sprinzak, Alexander Knox Helm, Leslie Hore-Belisha, and Moshe Sharett in the Knesset, 1951

== Commemoration ==
Kiryat Sprinzak, a neighbourhood in Haifa and Beit Shprinzak, a sanatorium in Nazareth are named in his memory.

== Bibliography ==
- Goldberg, Giora (2003). Ben-Gurion Against the Knesset. London: Routledge. ISBN 0-7146-5556-2
- Sofer, Sasson (1998). Zionism and the Foundations of Israeli Diplomacy. Cambridge: Cambridge University Press. ISBN 0-521-63012-6

Political offices
Position established	Speaker of the Knesset; 1949–1959	Succeeded by Nahum Nir
Preceded by Chaim Weizmann	President of Israel; Acting; 1952	Succeeded by Yitzhak Ben-Zvi
