= Kadish Luz =

Israeli politician (1895–1972)

- קַדִּישׁ לוּז
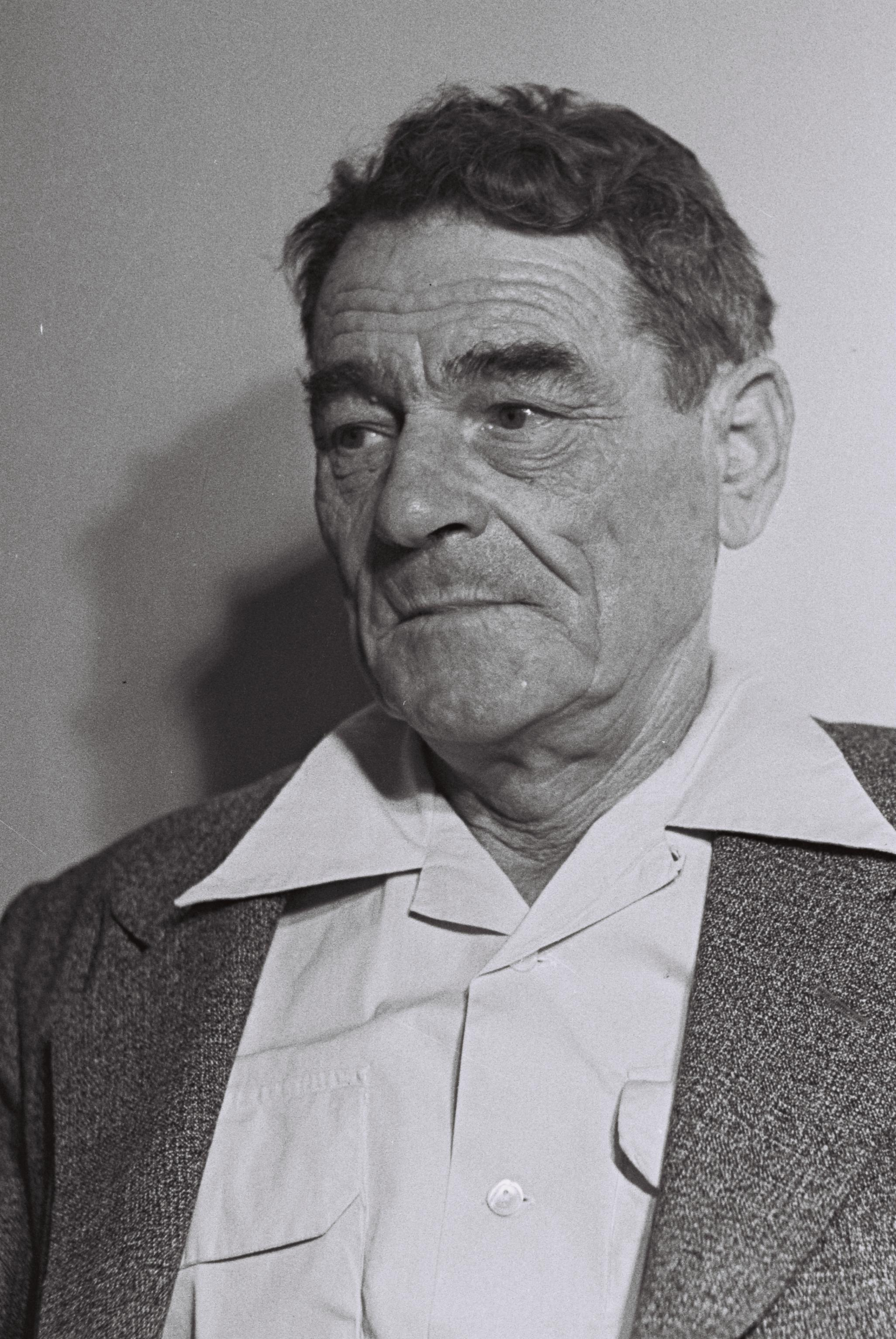
- Luz in 1955

Acting President of Israel
- In office 23 April 1963 – 21 May 1963
- Prime Minister: David Ben-Gurion
- Preceded by: Yitzhak Ben-Zvi
- Succeeded by: Zalman Shazar

Speaker of the Knesset
- In office 30 November 1959 – 17 November 1969
- Preceded by: Nahum Nir
- Succeeded by: Reuven Barkat

Ministerial roles
- 1955–1959: Minister of Agriculture

Faction represented in the Knesset
- 1951–1965: Mapai
- 1965–1968: Alignment
- 1968–1969: Labor Party
- 1969: Alignment

Personal details
- Born: Kadish Luzinski; 10 January 1895 Babruysk, Russian Empire
- Died: 4 December 1972 (aged 77) Kfar Saba, Israel
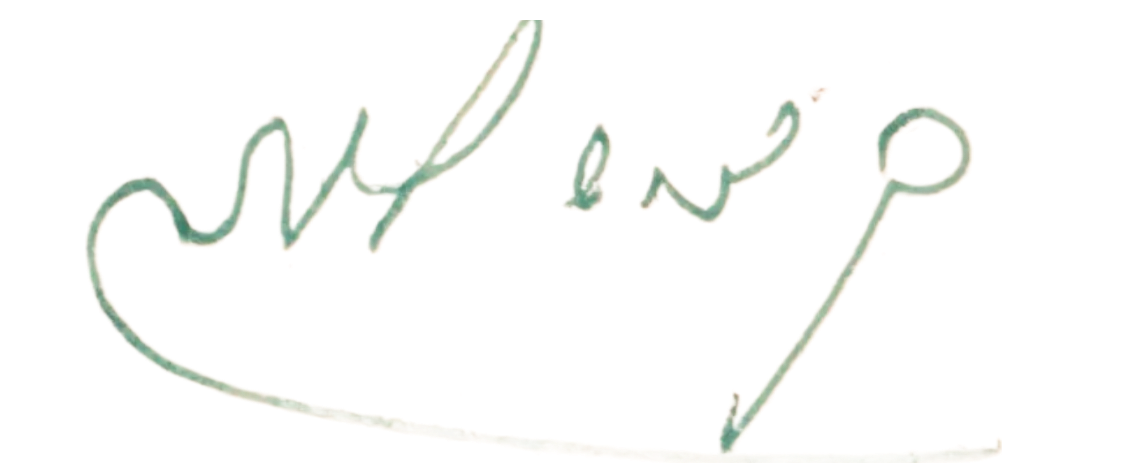
- Signature

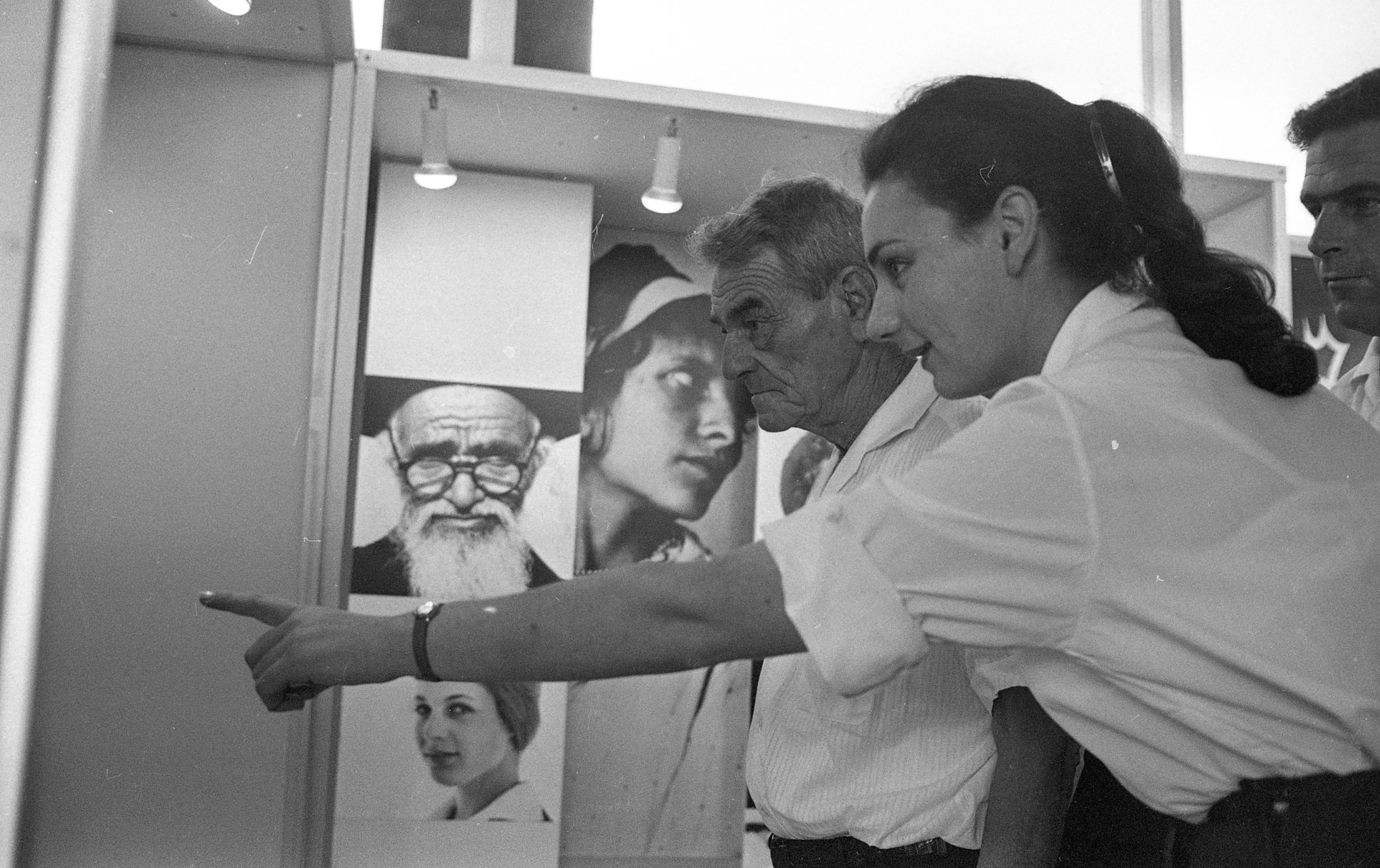
Kadish Luz visiting the Shalom Al Israel exhibition in 1969

Kadish Luz (Hebrew: קַדִּישׁ לוּז; 10 January 1895 – 4 December 1972) was an Israeli politician who served as Minister of Agriculture between 1955 and 1959 and as Speaker of the Knesset from 1959 and 1969. He is the longest-serving speaker of the Knesset. Born in Russia, he immigrated to Mandatory Palestine and fought in the 1948 Arab–Israeli War as part of the Haganah.

== Early life ==
Kadish Luz was born in Babruysk, on 10 January 1895. He was educated at the Polytechnic Institute in Karlsruhe, Germany, Economics Institute in St. Petersburg, Odesa National University, and University of Dorpat. He served in the Imperial Russian Army from 1916 to 1917. He immigrated to Mandatory Palestine in 1920. He initially worked as an agricultural labourer in Kiryat Anavim and Be'er Tuvia. He was a member of the Haganah and fought in the 1948 Arab–Israeli War.

== Career ==
Luz was put forward by Mapai for Speaker of the Knesset in 1959, and was unanimously elected with 112 votes in his favour while the 3 Maki members abstained. Luz was the longest-serving speaker, with a tenure of 9 years, 11 months, and 18 days. He was speaker from the fourth to sixth sessions of the Knesset.

Luz was Minister of Agriculture in the eighth government of Israel. The General Staff of the Israel Defense Forces and Ministry of Defense proposed a plan to occupy the Straits of Tiran in December 1955. However, the cabinet, including Luz, voted against the plan.

== Personal life ==
The Hebrew University of Jerusalem awarded Luz a honorary doctorate in 1968. Luz died in Kfar Saba, on 4 December 1972.

== Works cited ==
=== Books ===
- Barzilai, Gad (1996). Wars, Internal Conflicts, and Political Order: A Jewish Democracy in the Middle East. SUNY Press. ISBN 0791429431.

=== News ===
- "Hebrew U. Board to Hold Meeting on Mt. Scopus". St. Louis Jewish Light. 3 April 1968. p. 11 – via Newspapers.com.
- "Kadish Luz, 77, Dies; Ex-Knesset Speaker". The New York Times. 5 December 1972. Archived from the original on 11 August 2023.
- "Speaker Elected". The York Dispatch. 1 December 1959. p. 11 – via Newspapers.com.

=== Web ===
- "Kadish Luz". Knesset.
- "Knesset Record Holders". Knesset.
- "The Eighth Government". Government of Israel. Archived from the original on 5 November 2026.
