= Hitler teapot =

Kettle perceived to resemble Adolf Hitler

Hitler teapot

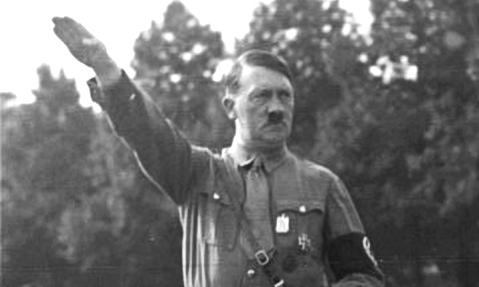
Adolf Hitler

The Michael Graves Design Bells and Whistles Stainless Steel Tea Kettle, colloquially known as the Hitler teapot, was a stainless-steel kettle sold in 2013 by the American retailer and department store chain JCPenney. It attracted attention on social media due to its perceived resemblance to the Nazi German dictator Adolf Hitler.

== Background ==
The kettle was part of a collection of products designed by the American architect and designer Michael Graves for JCPenney. It first attracted attention in May 2013 when a photograph of a billboard advertising the product on Interstate 405 in Culver City, California, was posted online. Internet users, especially of the social news aggregator Reddit, noted the kettle's perceived resemblance to Adolf Hitler, the dictator of Nazi Germany from 1933 to 1945. The kettle's design incorporated a black handle and lid top that many users interpreted to look like Hitler's parted hairstyle and toothbrush moustache, as well as a spout that was thought to resemble a right arm raised in a Nazi salute. In a poll of KPCC listeners, roughly 31 percent thought it resembled the dictator, while roughly 25 percent thought it did not.

== Response ==
Due to the media attention, JCPenney removed the billboard that sparked the initial heightened interest in the product, and said that any resemblance of the kettle to Hitler was unintentional, stating in a tweet: "If we'd designed the kettle to look like something, we would've gone [with a] snowman". The Hitler teapot has been cited as an example of pareidolia, a phenomenon in which individuals perceive meaningful images or patterns in otherwise random formations. Writing in Haaretz, Gavriel Rosenfeld characterized the popularity of the Hitler teapot as being part of a wider phenomenon of "Hitlerization" and Hitler memes.

Due to its notoriety, the kettle sold out at JCPenney's stores, with some later reappearing on eBay, priced as high as $199, much higher than the original retail price of $40.

== See also ==
- Adolf Hitler in popular culture § Internet
- Cats That Look Like Hitler
