= Nahum Nir =

Israeli politician

- נחום ניר
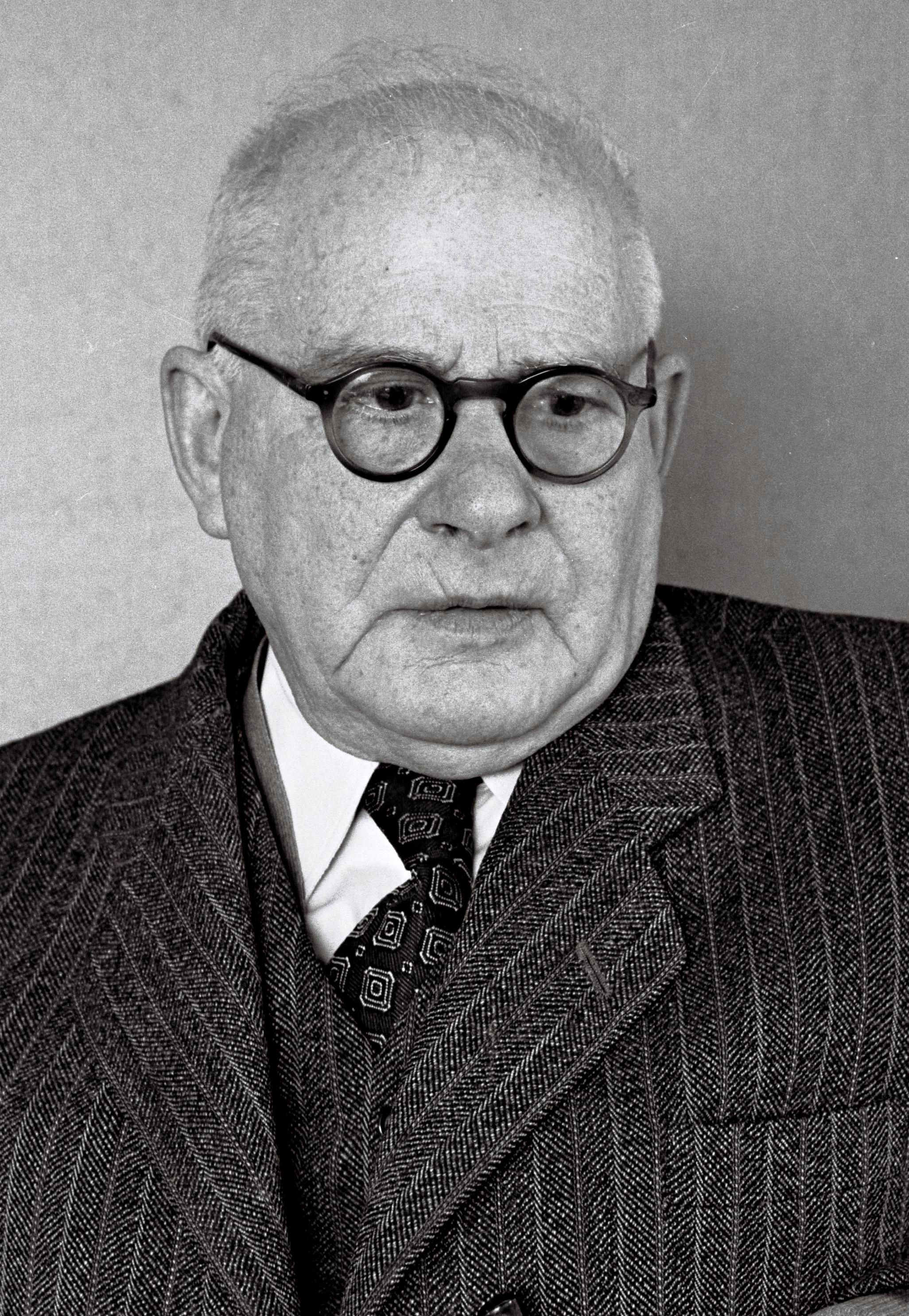
- Nir in 1956

Speaker of the Knesset
- In office 2 March 1959 – 30 November 1959
- Preceded by: Yosef Sprinzak
- Succeeded by: Kadish Luz

Faction represented in the Knesset
- 1949–1951: Mapam
- 1955–1965: Ahdut HaAvoda

Personal details
- Born: Nahum Rafalkes; 17 March 1884 Warsaw, Russian Empire
- Died: 10 July 1968 (aged 84) Tel Aviv, Israel

Nahum Nir-Rafalkes (Hebrew: נחום ניר; 17 March 1884 – 10 July 1968) was a Zionist activist, Israeli politician and one of the signatories of the Israeli declaration of independence. He was the only Speaker of the Knesset not to have been a member of the ruling party until Benny Gantz in 2020.

== Biography ==
Nir was born Nahum Rafalkes in Warsaw, then part of the Russian Empire, in 1884. He studied at a heder in the city before studying natural sciences at university in Warsaw, Zurich and St Petersburg. He also studied law at St Petersburg and Dorpat, gaining a LL.D in 1908.

In 1903 he joined the Zionist student's organisation Kadima, and was a delegate to the Sixth Zionist Congress that year. Two years later he joined Poale Zion, and was involved in the founding of World Poale Zion. Nir also served as head of the Polish Waiter's Union, and in 1906 led what he claimed to be the world's first successful strike against tipping. That year he was sent to prison for political activities, but still attended the seventh Zionist congress the following year. In 1919 he was elected to Warsaw City Council.

He was offered the position of Commissar for Jewish Affairs but turned it down after consultation with the Central Committee of Poale Zion.

When Poale Zion split, Nir joined the left-wing faction. He served as secretary of the Left World Union of Poale Zion, and was involved in negotiations to allow it to join Comintern. In 1925 he emigrated to Mandate Palestine and worked as a lawyer. In February 1948, he was elected head of the Economic Control Office.

== Political career ==
Nir continued to play a prominent role in Poale Zion and was a member of the Jewish National Council and the Assembly of Representatives prior to independence. A member of Moetzet HaAm (later the Provisional State Council), Nir signed the Israeli declaration of independence in 1948. That same year, his party merged with Mapam and Nir was elected to the First Knesset in 1949. He served as Deputy Speaker of the Knesset and chaired the Constitution, Law and Justice Committee.

Nir lost his seat in the 1951 elections. In 1954, Ahdut HaAvoda (a faction related to the Left Poale Zion) broke away from Mapam, and Nir assumed membership of the new party. He was returned to the Knesset on its list, when Tzipora Laskov resigned from her seat in October 1955, and again chaired the Constitution, Law and Justice Committee.

He was initially re-appointed Deputy Speaker of the Knesset, but following the death of the incumbent Yosef Sprinzak in January 1959, Nir stood in the election for a new speaker against a Mapai (Ben-Gurion's party) candidate. Nir won the election due to the support of the right-wing opposition and several minor left-wing parties, marking the first time in which a candidate not from the ruling party was elected Speaker, something not repeated until Benny Gantz was elected Speaker in 2020.

Nir retained his seat in the November 1959 elections, and chaired the committee for public services, but resumed his position as Deputy Speaker when the Knesset reconvened. After being re-elected in 1961 he served again as Deputy speaker and chairman of the committee for public services. He lost his seat in the 1965 elections.

Streets in the cities of Bat Yam, Netanya and Petah Tikva are named after him.

== Published works ==
- Chapters of Life - The scope of the generation and the movement 1884-1918 (1958)
