= Reuven Barkat =

Israeli politician (1906–1972)

- ראובן ברקת
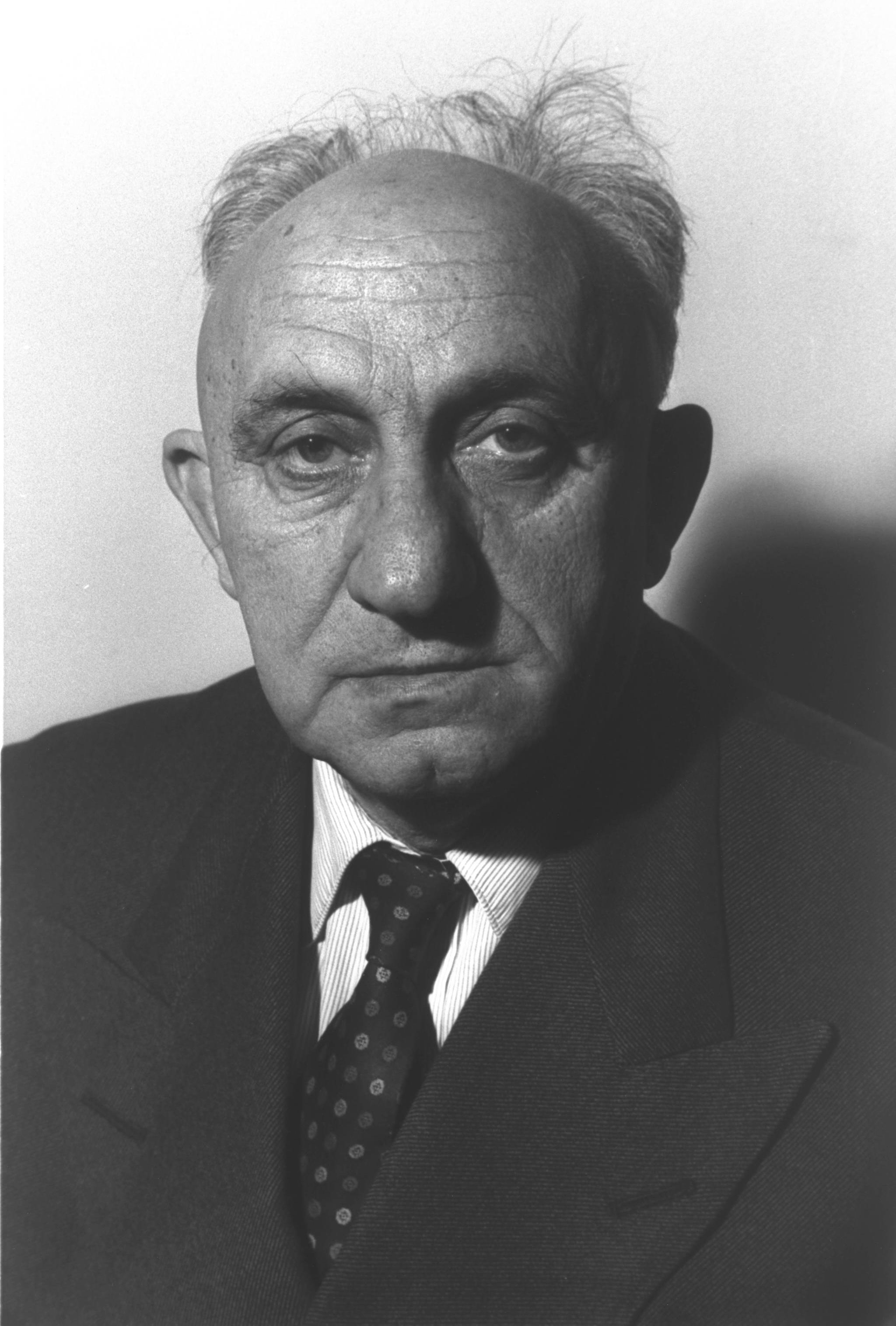
- Barkat in 1966

Speaker of the Knesset
- In office 17 November 1969 – 5 April 1972
- Preceded by: Kadish Luz
- Succeeded by: Yisrael Yeshayahu

Faction represented in the Knesset
- 1965–1968: Alignment
- 1968–1969: Labor Party
- 1969–1972: Alignment

Personal details
- Born: Reuven Borstein; 25 October 1906 Tauragė, Russian Empire
- Died: 5 April 1972 (aged 65) Jerusalem

Reuven Barkat (Hebrew: ראובן ברקת; 25 October 1906 – 5 April 1972) was an Israeli politician who served as a member of the Knesset for the Alignment and the Labor Party from 1965 until his death in 1972.

== Biography ==
Born Reuven Borstein in Tauragė in the Kovno Governorate of the Russian Empire (today in Lithuania), Barkat was educated in a heder and yeshiva, before attending the Jewish Gymnasium of Lithuania. He was amongst the founders of the Young Pioneer and Young Hebrew movements in the country. He later studied law and literature at the University of Paris and University of Strasbourg, and chaired the Union of Hebrew Students.

In 1926 he made aliyah to Mandatory Palestine. From 1928 until 1933 he worked as secretary of HaMerkaz HaHakla'i's settlement department, before becoming director of the Department of Public Contacts, which organised the transfer of Jewish property from Nazi Germany to Palestine, a post he held until 1938.

Between 1940 and 1946 he served as general secretary of the National Committee for the Jewish Soldier, before joining the Histadrut's political department. In 1949 he became the department's head, and also a member of the union's central committee. He later also headed the Arab Affairs department.

In 1960 Barkat was appointed ambassador to Norway. In 1962 he became Mapai's general secretary, a position he held until 1966. In 1965 he was elected to the Knesset on the Alignment list (an alliance of Mapai and Ahdut HaAvoda). He was re-elected in 1969, and was appointed Speaker of the Knesset. However, he died in office in 1972 at the age of 65. His seat was taken by Aviad Yafeh.
