= Kistler House =

Historic house in Massachusetts, United States

- U.S. National Register of Historic Places
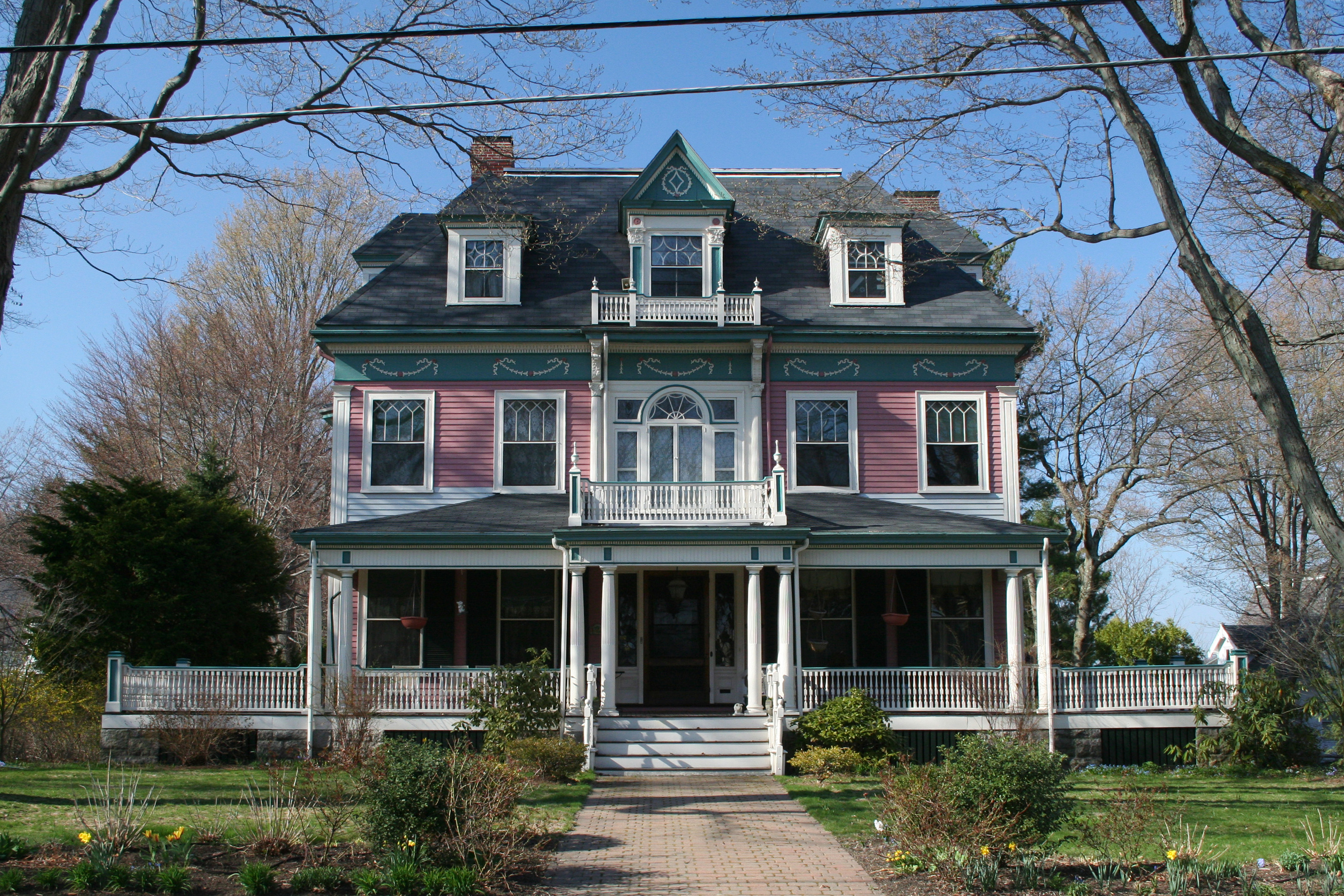

- Location within Massachusetts Location within the United States
- Location: 945 Beacon St., Newton, Massachusetts
- Coordinates: 42°19′50″N 71°12′5″W
- Built: 1893
- Architectural style: Colonial Revival
- MPS: Newton MRA
- NRHP reference No.: 86001849
- Added to NRHP: September 04, 1986

The Kistler House is a historic house at 945 Beacon Street in Newton, Massachusetts. The 2 1/2-story wood-frame house was built in 1893, and is one of Newton Center's most elaborate Colonial Revival houses. It has a veranda that wraps around two sides of the house, although a porch shelters the front facade. The porch is supported by clusters of slender columns, with a projecting central section framing the main entrance, which has leaded glass sidelight windows. A Palladian window stands above the main entrance, and the cornice line is embellished with egg-and-dart moulding, dentil moulding, and a frieze decorated with swags. Andrew Kistler, the owner, was a leather dealer working in Boston.

The house was listed on the National Register of Historic Places in 1986.

== See also ==
- National Register of Historic Places listings in Newton, Massachusetts
