= Kistler (surname) =

Kistter is a German occupational surname from kisteler, 'box maker, carpenter'. Notable people with the surname include:

- Cyrill Kistler (1848–1907), German composer
- Darci Kistler (born 1964), American ballerina
- Doug Kistler (1938—1980), American basketball player
- Jon Kistler (born 2003), Swiss ski mountaineer
- Lynton Richards Kistler (1897–1993), American master printmaker, small book publisher, and author
- Mark D Kistler (born 1963), American artist
- Rives Kistler (born 1969), American judge
- Stefan Kistler (1900–?), German soldier and skier, competitor in the 1928 Winter Olympics (military patrol)
- Steven Kistler (1900–1975), American scientist, inventor of aerogels
- Walter Kistler (1918–2015), Swiss physicist and inventor

== See also ==
- {intitle|Kistler}}
- Kistler (disambiguation)
