= Yisrael Yeshayahu =

Israeli politician (1908–1979)

- יִשְׂרָאֵל יְשַׁעְיָהוּ
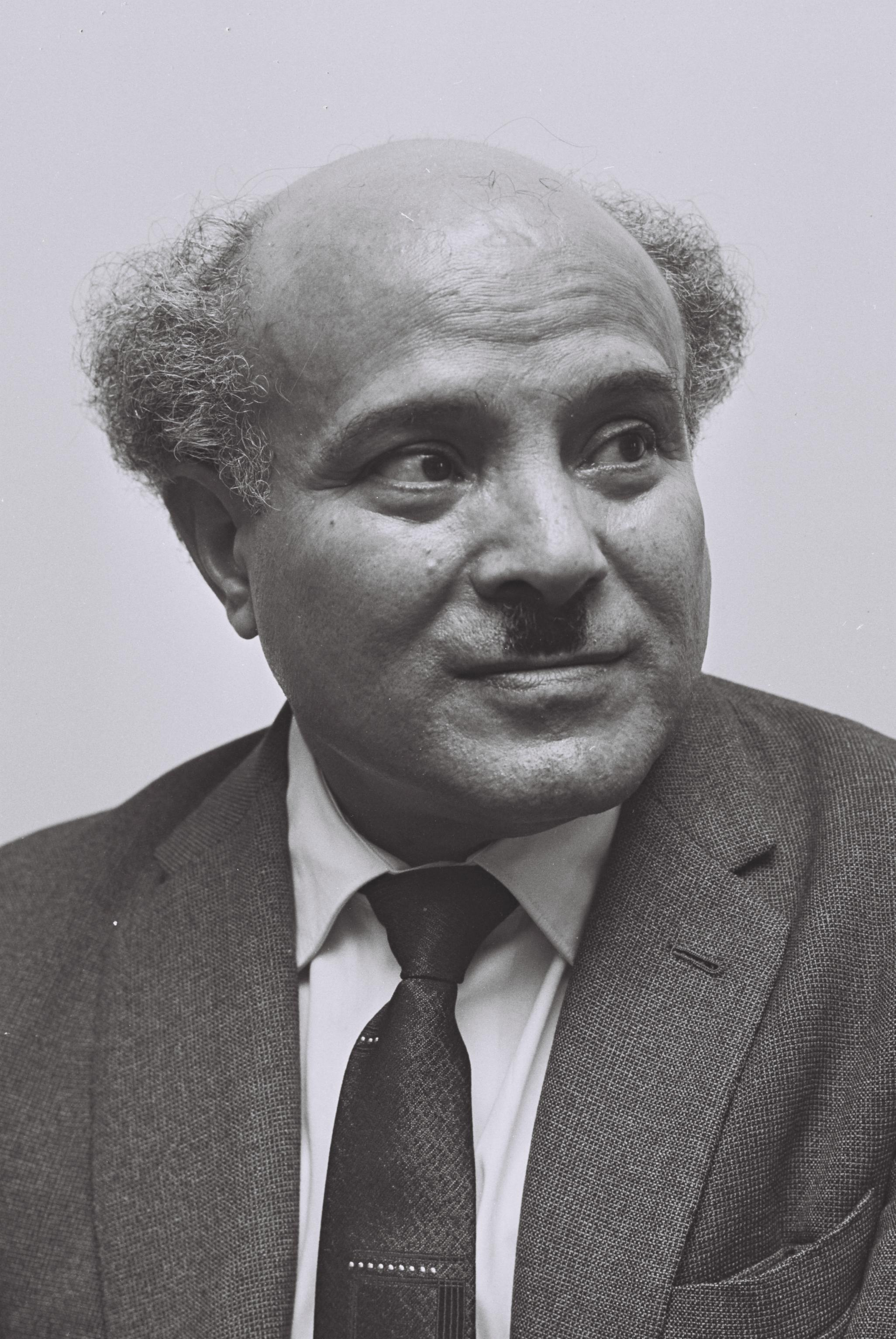

Speaker of the Knesset
- In office 9 May 1972 – 13 June 1977
- Preceded by: Reuven Barkat
- Succeeded by: Yitzhak Shamir

Ministerial roles
- 1967–1969: Minister of Postal Services

Faction represented in the Knesset
- 1951–1965: Mapai
- 1965–1968: Alignment
- 1968–1969: Labor Party
- 1969–1977: Alignment

Personal details
- Born: 20 April 1908 Sadeh, Yemen Vilayet, Ottoman Empire
- Died: 20 June 1979 (aged 71) Jerusalem, Israel

Yisrael Yeshayahu Sharabi (Hebrew: יִשְׂרָאֵל יְשַׁעְיָהוּ שַׁרְעַבִּי; 20 April 1908 – 20 June 1979) was an Israeli politician, minister and the fifth Speaker of the Knesset.

== Biography ==
Born in Sadeh, Yemen, to a Jewish weaver by trade, he was sent to Sana'a at an early age where he studied under Rabbi Yihya Qafih (d. 1931). Yeshayahu soon became a member of the Dor Daim movement, before making aliyah in 1929. He became head of the Yemenite Immigrant and Eastern Jewry Department of the Histadrut in 1934, a position he retained until 1948 when he started organizing the immigration of Yemenite Jews, including Operation Magic Carpet.

A member of the Tel Aviv Workers Council, he was also a delegate to the Zionist Congress and the Assembly of Representatives. He served as Deputy Secretary of Government and communications officer between the Government and the Knesset between 1948 and 1949.

He narrowly missed out on being elected to the first Knesset in 1949, but entered it in 1951 after the death of Knesset and Mapai party member Avraham Tabib, and was suddenly advanced from the seventy-seventh ranking member of the Mapai party to the twenty-ninth ranking member, displacing Aryeh Sheftel. Yeshayahu retained his seat in the Israeli Parliament (Knesset) in every election for the next twenty-six years, until 1977. He was appointed Minister of Postal Services in 1967, a role he retained until the 1969 elections. After serving as Secretary General of the Labour Party between 1971 and 1972, he was made Speaker of the Knesset in 1972, a role he retained until 1977.

At the age of twelve, he studied under the great Yemenite Rabbi and scholar, Yosef Qafih. In Yemen, he belonged to the Baladi-rite congregations of Yemenite Jews and was active in the Dor Daim community, although he was originally from a community that embraced the Shami-rite. Yisrael Yeshayahu co-edited a book with Aharon Tzadok in 1945.

He was buried on Mount Herzl, his grave is next to the grave of Golda Meir. Streets were named after him in Kiryat Yam, Beer Sheva, Petah Tikva, Kfar Saba and other cities.
