= Menachem Savidor =

Israeli politician (1917–1988)

- מנחם סבידור
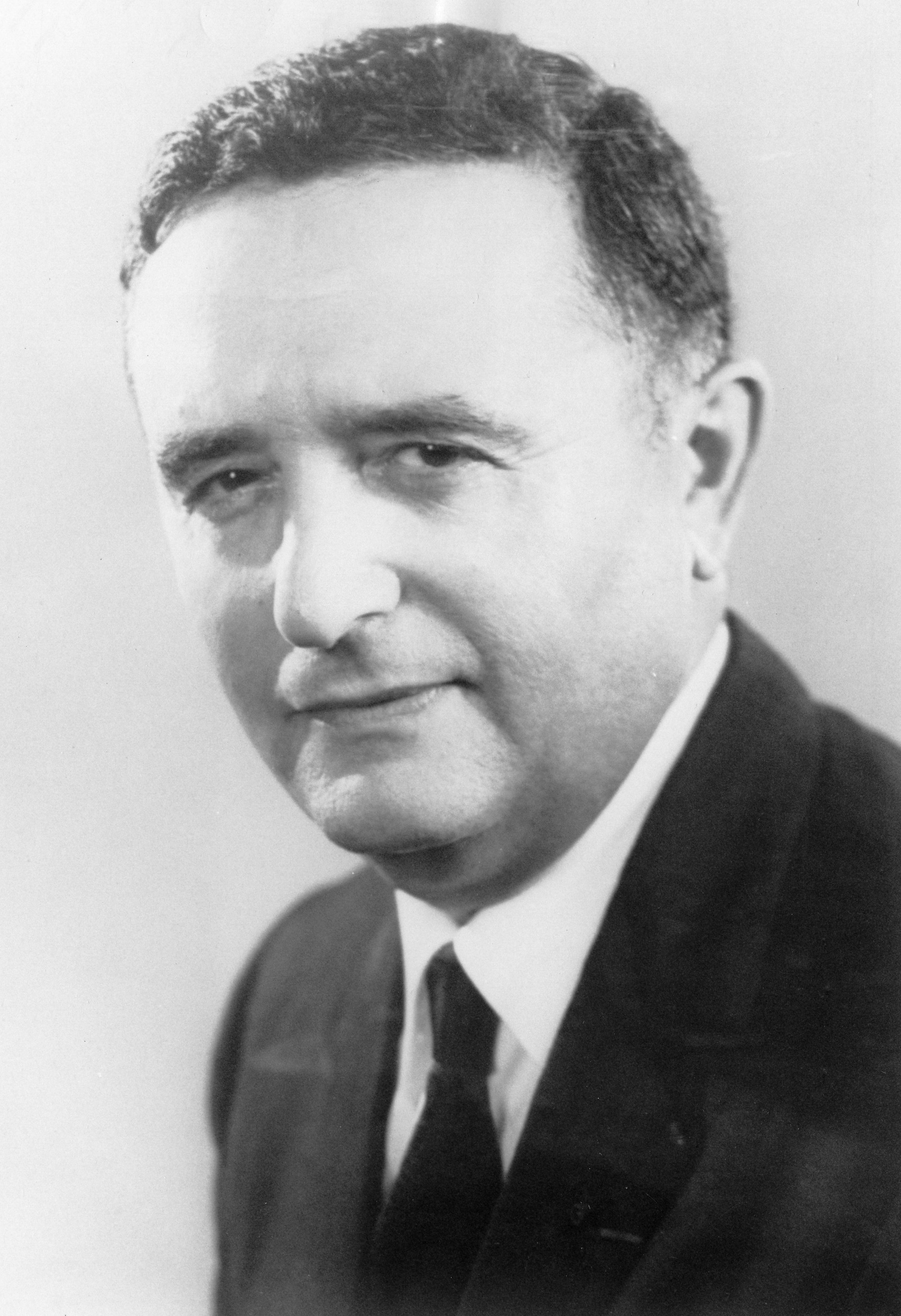

Speaker of the Knesset
- In office 20 July 1981 – 13 August 1984
- Preceded by: Yitzhak Berman
- Succeeded by: Shlomo Hillel

Faction represented in the Knesset
- 1977–1984: Likud

Personal details
- Born: Menachem Khodorovsky; 20 August 1917 Bakhmut, Russian Empire
- Died: 2 November 1988 (aged 71)

Menachem Savidor (Hebrew: מנחם סבידור; 20 August 1917 – 2 November 1988) was an Israeli civil servant and politician who served as a member of the Knesset for Likud from 1977 until 1984. Between 1981 and 1984 he was the Speaker of the Knesset.

== Biography ==
Born Menachem Khodorovsky in Bakhmut in the Russian Empire, Savidor attended high school in Poland and Vilnius University. In 1941 he emigrated to Mandate Palestine and enlisted in the British Army. He was demobilised in 1946 and enlisted in the Israel Defense Forces in 1948. He founded the Military School for Organisation and Management and was its first commander. He also headed the Police and Discipline Branch. In 1953, he was demobilised with the rank of lieutenant colonel.

In 1953 he joined the General Zionists party and was also appointed deputy director of the Ministry of Transportation. The following year he became director-general of Israel Railways, a post he held until 1964 when he was appointed director-general of Vered, a subsidiary of the Rassco housing company. After leaving the role in 1967, he served as director-general of a citrus fruit export company until 1977.

He was elected to Tel Aviv city council and headed the Gahal faction (an alliance of the Liberal Party, which the General Zionists had merged into, and Herut) from 1969 until 1974. He became deputy chairman of the Liberal Party's central committee and headed its political think tank. In 1977 he was elected to the Knesset on the Likud list, an alliance of the Liberal Party, Herut and other right-wing parties. He was re-elected in 1981, and was appointed Speaker of the Knesset, replacing Yitzhak Berman.

Having lost his seat in the 1984 elections, Savidor was appointed chairman of the Public Committee to Rehabilitate the Economy in 1985. In 1987 he became chairman of the Fund for the Security of Israel but died the following year at the age of 71.

The Tel Aviv Savidor Central Railway Station is named after him.
