= Marzahn-Hellersdorf 4 =

State electoral district of Germany

- Electoral district for the Berlin House of Representatives
- Marzahn-Hellersdorf 4 in 2026
- District: Marzahn-Hellersdorf
- Electorate: 34,922 (2024)

Current electoral district
- Party: AfD
- Member: Martin Koblischke

Marzahn-Hellersdorf 4 is an electoral constituency (German: Wahlkreis) represented in the House of Representatives of Berlin. It elects one member via first-past-the-post voting.

== Geography ==
The constituency comprises the areas of Marzahner Chaussee, Springfuhl, North Biesdorf, and South Biesdorf. It is entirely within the borough of Marzahn-Hellersdorf.

There were 34,922 eligible voters in 2026.

== Members ==
Election	Member	Party	%
1999	Stefan Liebich	PDS	45.4
2001	Stefan Liebich	PDS	47.5
2006	Carl Wechselberg	The Left	38.2
Sept 2009	Carl Wechselberg	SPD	38.2
2011	Regina Kittler	The Left	30.4
2016	Christian Gräff	CDU	26.0
2021	Christian Gräff	CDU	35.5
2023	Christian Gräff	CDU	42.9
2026	Martin Koblischke	AfD	26.4

== Election results ==
=== 2026 election ===
State election (2026): Marzahn-Hellersdorf 4
Notes:	Blue background denotes the winner of the electorate vote. Pink background denotes a candidate elected from their party list. Yellow background denotes an electorate win by a list member, or other incumbent. A ✓ or ✗ denotes status of any incumbent, win or lose respectively.						
Party	Candidate	Votes	%	±%	Party votes	%	±%
AfD	Martin Koblischke	6,748	26.4	▲12.3	7,077	27.4	▲12.7
CDU	Johannes Martin	6,147	24.0	▼18.9	5,177	20.0	▼16.4
Left	Markus Berg	4,850	18.9	▲4.0	5,312	20.6	▲6.2
Greens	Pascal Grothe	3,132	12.2	▲5.1	1,991	7.7	▲0.9
SPD	Maria Geidel-Künne	1,861	7.3	▼5.4	2,224	8.6	▼7.1
BSW	Robert Schneider	1,848	7.2		2,028	7.8	
Volt	Judith Lange	519	2.0		413	1.6	▲1.2
Tierschutzpartei					632	2.4	▼0.6
FDP	Anja Molnar	498	1.9	▼0.3	583	2.3	▼0.8
PARTEI					215	0.8	▼0.2
PdF					88	0.3	
DKP					48	0.2	▼0.2
ÖDP					31	0.1	Steady
du.					20	0.1	▼0.1
SGP					9	0.0	Steady
Informal votes		574			329		
Total valid votes		25,603			25,848		
Turnout		26,177	75.0	▲10.5			
AfD gain from CDU	Majority	601	2.4				

=== 2023 repeat election ===
Changes denoted below for the 2023 election are compared to the 2016 election, as the 2021 election was declared invalid.

State election (2023): Marzahn-Hellersdorf 4
Notes:	Blue background denotes the winner of the electorate vote. Pink background denotes a candidate elected from their party list. Yellow background denotes an electorate win by a list member, or other incumbent. A ✓ or ✗ denotes status of any incumbent, win or lose respectively.						
Party	Candidate	Votes	%	±%	Party votes	%	±%
CDU	✓ Christian Gräff	9,494	42.9	▲16.9	8,072	36.5	▲16.3
Left	Regina Kittler	3,314	15.0	▼11.0	3,187	14.4	▼10.0
AfD	Patrick Steven Fritsch	3,116	14.1	▼5.6	3,251	14.7	▼6.1
SPD	Dmitri Geidel	2,814	12.7	▼4.7	3,469	15.7	▼2.0
Greens	Pascal Grothe	1,582	7.1	▲2.3	1,508	6.8	▲1.8
Tierschutzpartei	Cornelia Schulz	768	3.5		671	3.0	▲1.3
FDP	Anja Molnar	498	2.3	▼0.4	668	3.0	▼0.2
PARTEI	Patric Schäfer	345	1.6		239	1.1	▲0.1
The Grays					130	0.6	
dieBasis	Axel Becker	201	0.9		126	0.6	
Gray Panthers					113	0.5	▼0.9
Volt					93	0.4	
DKP					79	0.4	Steady
Verjüngungsforschung					73	0.3	▼0.4
FW					55	0.2	
NPD					53	0.2	▼0.6
Pirates					53	0.2	▼0.8
Mieterpartei					49	0.2	
Team Todenhöfer					47	0.2	
Humanists					45	0.2	
Bildet Berlin!					35	0.2	
du.					34	0.2	
Klimaliste					23	0.1	
ÖDP					21	0.1	
SGP					16	0.1	Steady
The Pinks/Alliance 21					12	0.1	
BüSo					9	0.0	▼0.1
LKR					6	0.0	▼0.6
Bergpartei, die ÜberPartei					5	0.0	
Informal votes		225			174		
Total valid votes		22,132			22,142		
Turnout		22,372	64.5	▼4.2			
CDU hold	Majority	6,180	27.9				

=== 2021 election (annulled) ===
The election in 2021 was annulled and rerun in 2023.

State election (2021): Marzahn-Hellersdorf 4
Notes:	Blue background denotes the winner of the electorate vote. Pink background denotes a candidate elected from their party list. Yellow background denotes an electorate win by a list member, or other incumbent. A ✓ or ✗ denotes status of any incumbent, win or lose respectively.						
Party	Candidate	Votes	%	±%	Party votes	%	±%
CDU	✓ Christian Gräff	9,278	35.5	▲9.4	7,212	27.5	▲7.5
Left	Regina Kittler	4,879	18.7	▼7.3	4,788	18.3	▼6.1
SPD	Dmitri Geidel	3,720	14.2	▼3.2	4,589	17.5	▼0.1
AfD	Patrick Steven Fritsch	3,073	11.7	▼7.9	3,278	12.5	▼8.2
Greens	Pascal Grothe	2,156	8.2	▲3.4	2,084	7.9	▲3.0
FDP	Anja Molnar	1,082	4.1	▲1.5	1,239	4.7	▲1.5
Tierschutzpartei	Cornelia Schulz	1,008	3.9		649	2.5	▲0.7
PARTEI	Patric Schäfer	493	1.9		377	1.4	▲0.5
dieBasis	Axel Becker	466	1.8		327	1.2	
The Grays					246	0.9	
FW					204	0.8	
APT					164	0.6	
Gray Panthers					155	0.6	▼0.8
Volt					139	0.5	
Verjüngungsforschung					106	0.4	▼0.3
Pirates					103	0.4	▼0.6
Team Todenhöfer					90	0.3	
DKP					83	0.3	Steady
Humanists					68	0.3	
Mieterpartei					59	0.2	
Bildet Berlin!					52	0.2	
NPD					48	0.2	▼0.7
Klimaliste					40	0.2	
ÖDP					30	0.1	
du.					24	0.1	
LKR					17	0.1	▼0.6
The Pinks/Alliance 21					17	0.1	
BüSo					16	0.1	▼0.1
Bergpartei, die ÜberPartei					5	0.0	
SGP					5	0.0	▼0.1
Informal votes		315			242		
Total valid votes		26,155			26,214		
Turnout		26,510	76.2	▲7.5			
CDU hold	Majority	4,399	16.8				

== See also ==
- Politics of Berlin
- House of Representatives of Berlin
