= Cats That Look Like Hitler! =

Satirical website for photographs of cats

- Website type: Satirical
- Available in: English
- Owner: Paul Neve
- Founder: Koos Plegt
- Website: www.catsthatlooklikehitler.com/cgi-bin/seigmiaow.pl
- Commercial: No
- Launched: 2006

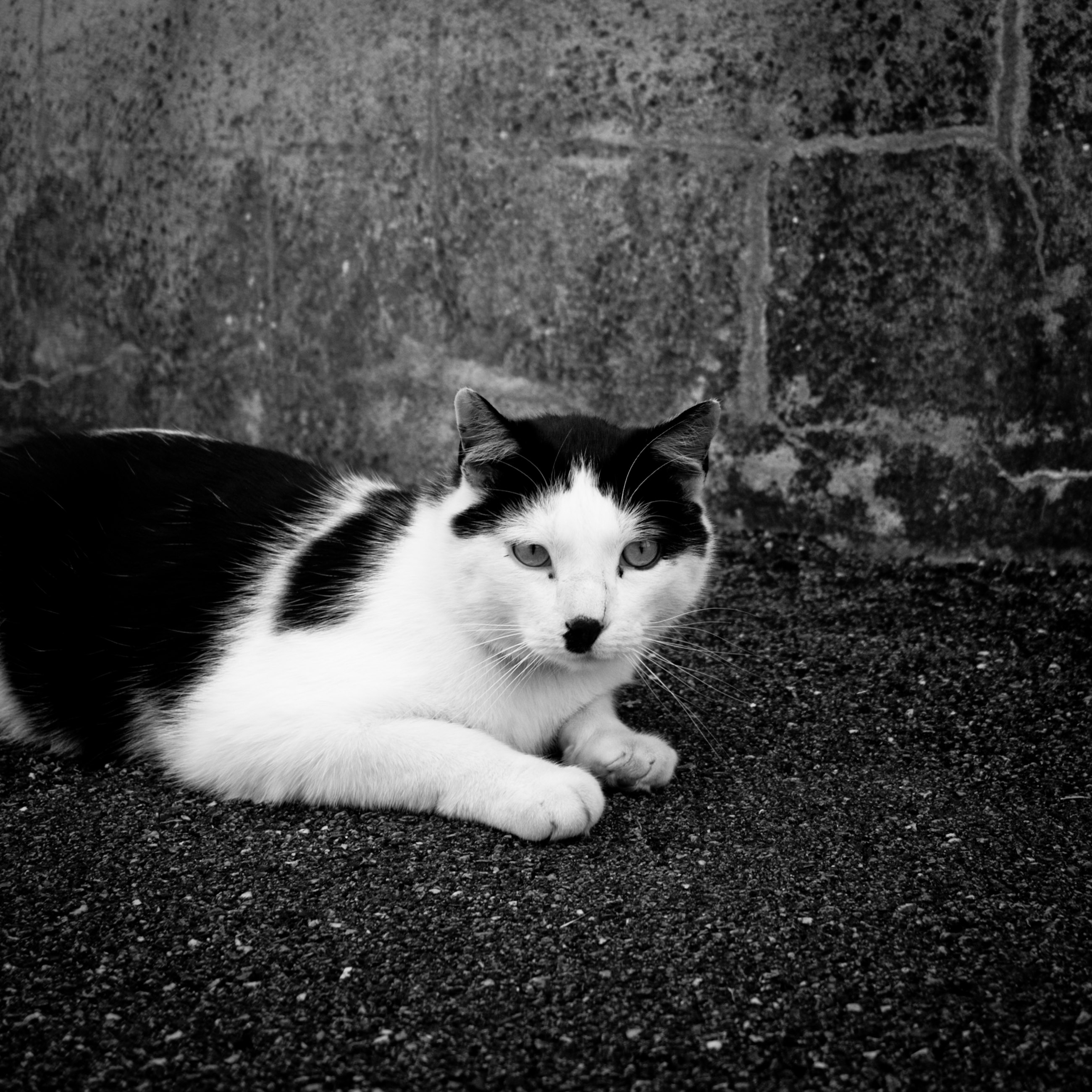
A cat with a black splotch underneath its nose that somewhat resembles Hitler's toothbrush mustache

Cats That Look Like Hitler! is a satirical website featuring user-submitted photographs of cats resembling Adolf Hitler. The meme resulting from this resemblance has more broadly influenced cultural depictions of Hitler.

== History ==
The site was founded by Dutchman Koos Plegt in May 2006, on a whim after noticing a local cat whose appearance reminded him of Hitler. In partnership with an early fan, the Englishman Paul Neve, the site was reworked into its present form, attaining its peak internet virality later that year. It was subsequently featured by several television, print, and other media vehicles across Europe, Australia, and North America, including coverage in the Daily Mail and The Sun, as well as on The Graham Norton Show in 2008 and The Colbert Report in 2010, sparking further waves of popularity.

The site was later run only by Neve. By February 2013 he had approved photographs of over 7,500 cats. The website has not been updated since April 2014.

== Meme ==
The website refers to the cats depicted as kitlers, a concept that has propagated to other online media, taking on a life of its own as an internet meme. Most such cats are piebald black and white, with a black splotch underneath their noses, much like the dictator's toothbrush moustache, and other features that suggest a typically stern expression. Some have diagonal black patches on their heads resembling Hitler's fringe.

== Cultural commentary ==
=== Website ===
The site's mainstream media coverage mostly focuses on its comedic aspects. In 2007, Mikita Brottman described the website as being popular due to "its appealing combination of funny pet pictures, audience participation (no dictatorship here), and the way it hovers on the edge of bad taste without going all the way."

Gavriel D. Rosenfeld locates the site within a post-2000 shift from "moralistic" towards "humorous" representations of Hitler, arguing this has the effect of "normalizing" the legacy of the Nazi period, that is, "overturning [its] perceived exceptionality" in historical memory. He notes the site owner rejects accusations of "glorifying Hitler" by stating "it's entirely appropriate to reduce him to an object of ridicule".

=== Meme ===
Maren Lickhardt suggests that the Kitler meme trivializes Hitler by comparing him to a cat, that it may still have merit insofar as it deconstructs the Nazi regime's preferred self-presentation ('the virile aesthetics of terror'), but that this implication is undercut in turn by admiration for cats' stereotypically dictatorial bearing. She attributes the popularity of the meme in part to viewers' familiarity with its components — cats are a staple of Internet culture, and the Hitler moustache-fringe icon is also well-known.

== See also ==
- Hitler teapot
- List of Internet phenomena
- Lolcat
- Maus
