= Adolf Hitler in popular culture =

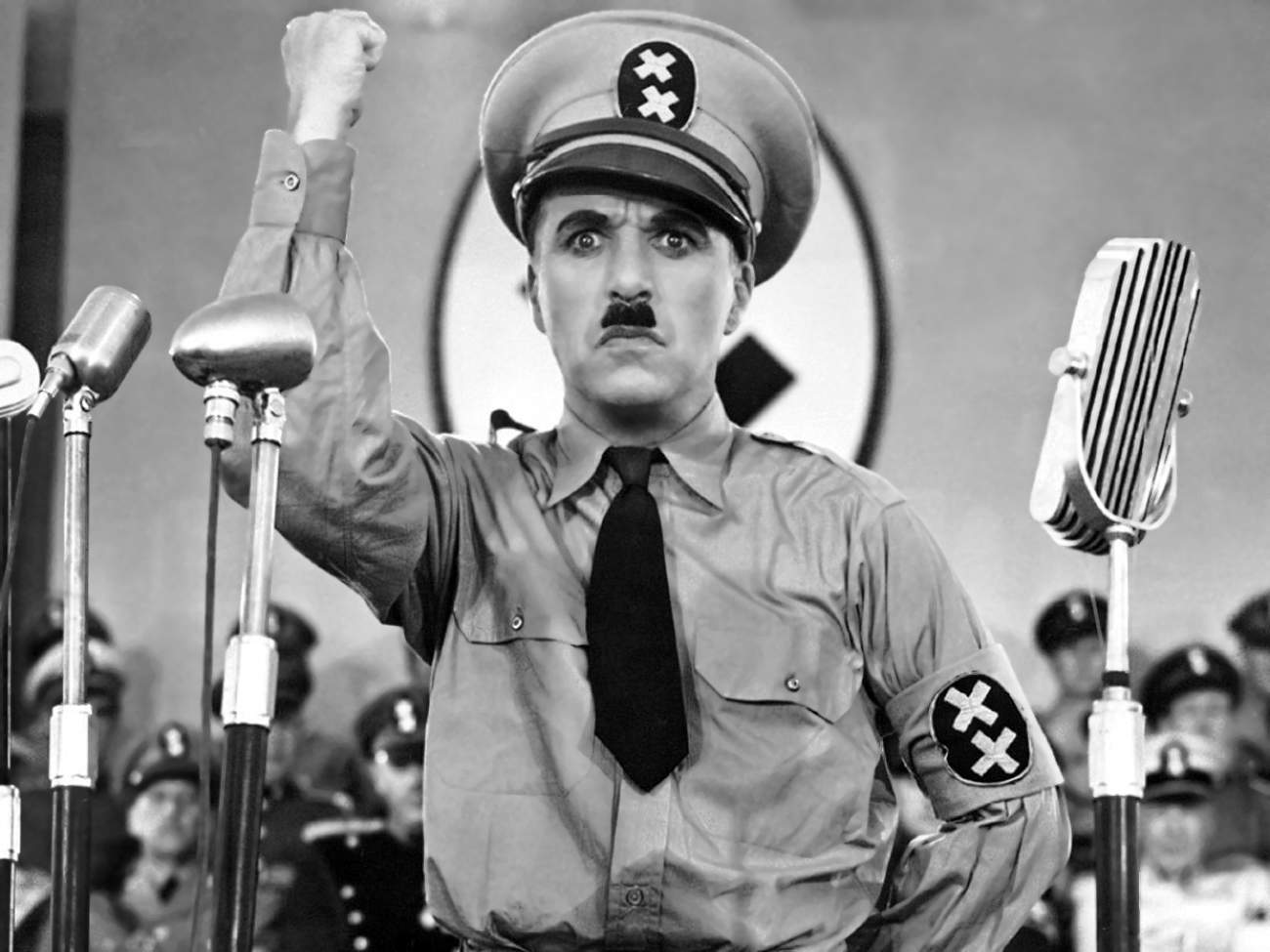
Charlie Chaplin as "Adenoid Hynkel" in the film The Great Dictator, 1940

Adolf Hitler, dictator of Nazi Germany from 1933 to 1945, has been represented in popular culture ever since he became a well-known politician in Germany. His distinctive image was often parodied by his opponents. Parodies became much more prominent outside Germany during his period in power. Since the end of World War II representations of Hitler, both serious and satirical, have continued to be prominent in popular culture, sometimes generating significant controversy. In many periodicals, books, and movies, Hitler and Nazism fulfill the role of archetypal evil. This treatment is not confined to fiction but is widespread amongst nonfiction writers who have discussed him in this vein. Hitler has retained a fascination from other perspectives; among many comparable examples is an exhibition at the German Historical Museum which was widely attended.

== Depictions of Hitler during his lifetime ==
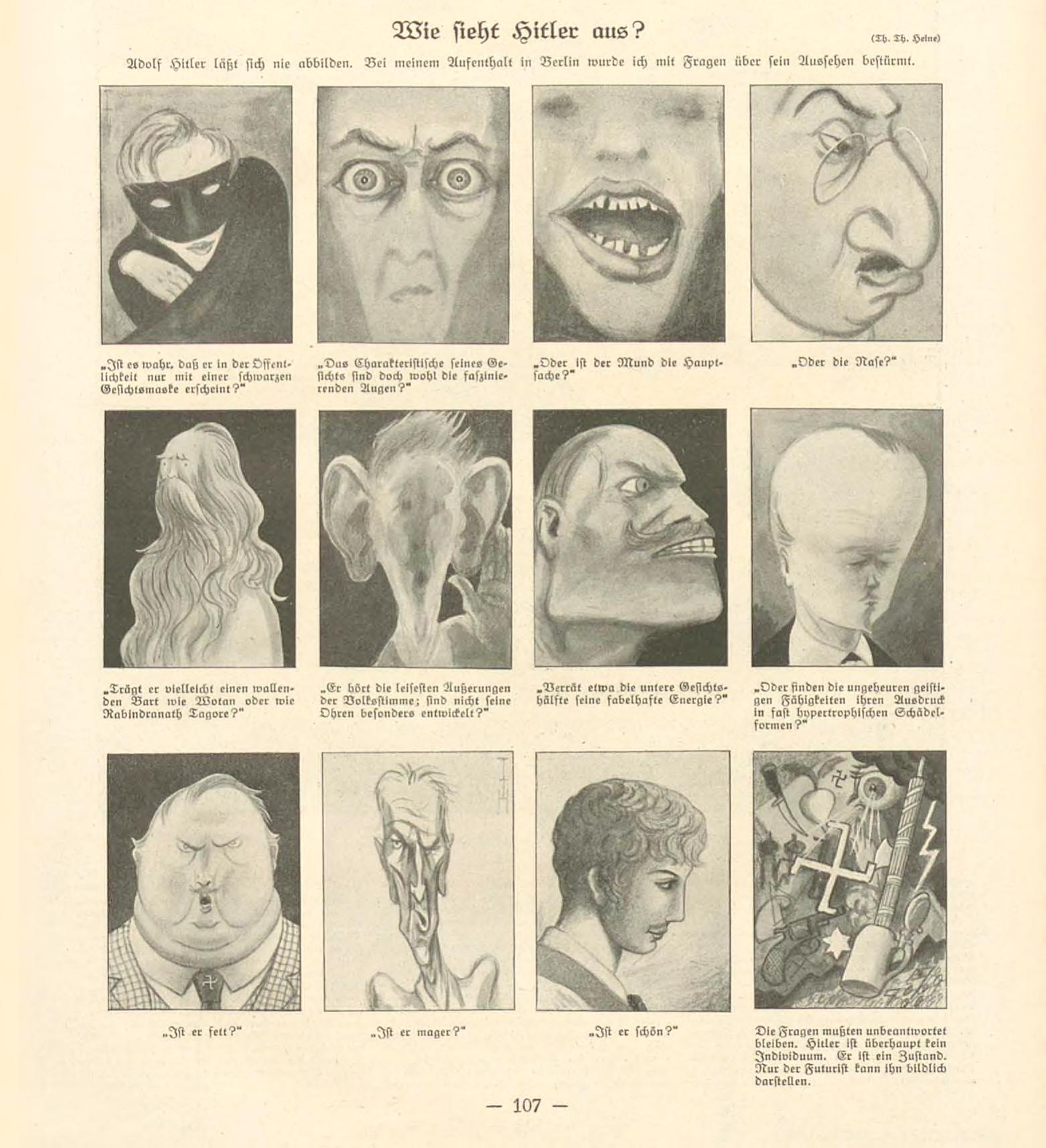
What Does Hitler Look Like? A satirical gallery by Thomas Theodor Heine for the May 1923 issue of Simplicissimus before photos of Hitler were publicly available. The final caption: The questions had to remain unanswered. Hitler is not an individual at all. He is a state. Only the futurist can depict him.

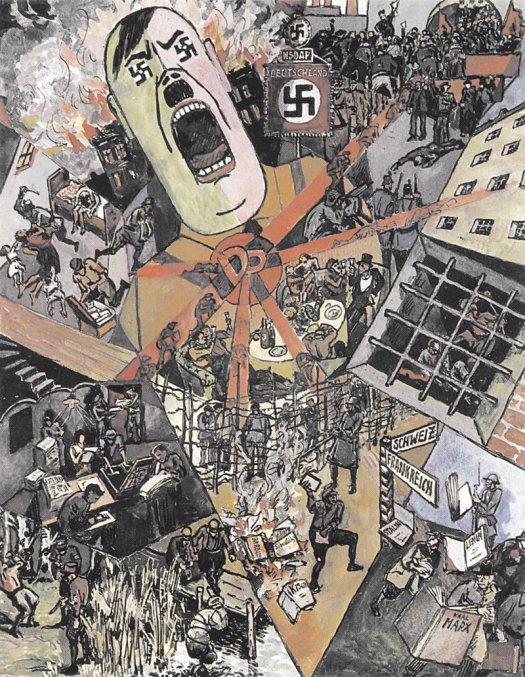
"The Third Reich", 1934 painting by the anti-Nazi exile German painter Heinrich Vogeler

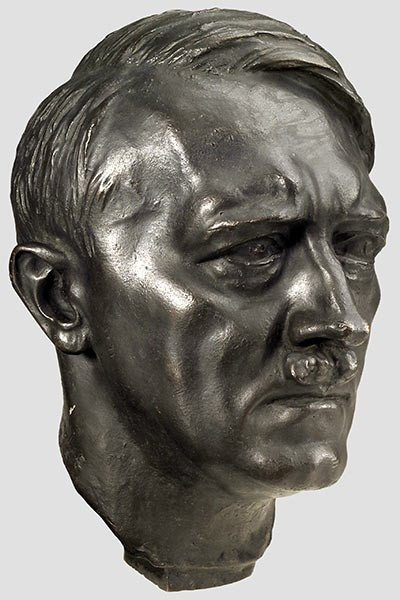
A heroic image of Hitler (1938 sculpture by Arno Breker).

Numerous works in popular music and literature feature Adolf Hitler prominently.

In Germany, before he gained power, Hitler was often portrayed satirically in newspaper cartoons and propaganda by political enemies. The photomontagist John Heartfield regularly depicted Hitler in absurd ways in his anti-Nazi poster designs. After the Nazis came to national power in January 1933, Hitler was mostly depicted as a god-like figure, loved and respected by the German people, as shown for example in the Leni Riefenstahl propaganda film Triumph of the Will (1935), which Hitler co-produced.

An exception was the German Fritz Lang film Das Testament des Dr. Mabuse (The Testament of Dr. Mabuse) from 1933, which was banned by the Nazi propaganda ministry. Many critics consider Lang's depiction of a homicidal maniac masterminding a criminal empire from within the walls of a criminal asylum to be an allegory of the Nazi ascent to power in Germany.

Outside Germany, Hitler's persona was often parodied. The George Bernard Shaw play Geneva (1936) includes a caricature of Hitler as "Herr Battler", appearing at an international tribunal with his friends "Signor Bombardone" (Mussolini) and "General Flanco" (Franco). Numerous cartoons satirize his distinctive features, such as those by David Low.

In the United States the 1934 Production Code Administration made the 1927 Hays Code binding on American studios which put a damper on films mocking public figures or national identities including Hitler and the Nazis. Another discouraging factor was that Germany and Italy contributed to 30% of the American film industry's overseas profits. In 1933 two animated shorts, Cubby Bear in World Flight and Bosko's Picture Show appeared in theatres. The former only had Hitler waving a beer stein but the latter depicted him chasing Jimmy Durante with an axe. In 1934 two documentaries, Hitler's Reign of Terror and Are We Civilized? were released but were both were unable to obtain a wide distribution. American isolationists and anti-war advocates often regarded criticism of Nazism as pro-war propaganda. Studio executives were also concerned that such criticism could exacerbate already-existing antisemitism in the United States.

=== After the start of the war ===
Another early example of a cryptic depiction is in the Bertolt Brecht play The Resistible Rise of Arturo Ui (1941), in which Hitler, in the persona of the principal character Arturo Ui, a Chicago racketeer in the cauliflower trade, is ruthlessly satirised. Brecht, who was German, but left when the Nazis came to power, also expressed his opposition to the National Socialist and Fascist movements in other plays such as Mother Courage and Fear and Misery of the Third Reich.

Outside Germany, Hitler was made fun of or depicted as a maniac. There are many notable examples in contemporary Hollywood films. Several Three Stooges shorts, the first being You Nazty Spy! (1940), the very first Hollywood work lampooning Hitler and the Nazis in which the boys, with Moe Howard portraying "Moe Hailstone", as the Hitler character, are made dictators of the fictional country of Moronika. This short in particular implies that business interests were behind Hitler's rise to power, and was said to be Moe Howard's and Larry Fine's favorite Stooges short subject. A sequel was released a year later entitled I'll Never Heil Again. This one illustrated the disagreements between Hitler and the League of Nations. In other Three Stooges shorts, Hitler is referred to as "Schicklgruber" in reference to his father Alois Hitler's birth name. First released some nine months after the Stooges' initial Nazi-lampooning short subject, Charlie Chaplin made fun of Hitler as "Adenoid Hynkel", the buffoonish dictator of Tomainia, in his film The Great Dictator (1940). This is one of the most recognizable Hitler parodies.

Especially during World War II, Hitler was caricatured in numerous animated shorts, including Der Fuehrer's Face, a 1942 Disney wartime propaganda cartoon featuring Donald Duck (inspired by Spike Jones' performance of the song written by Oliver Wallace), and the Warner Bros. cartoon Herr Meets Hare featuring Bugs Bunny. Another 1942 Warner cartoon The Ducktators caricatures Hitler as a duck hatched from a black egg, Benito Mussolini as a goose and Hideki Tojo as a Japanese styled duck. However, Hitler's first appearance on a Warner Brothers cartoon was in Bosko's Picture Show in 1933 in a short gag where Hitler is shown chasing after Jimmy Durante with an ax. George Grosz painted Cain, or Hitler in Hell (1944) showing the dead attacking Hitler in hell. The photomontage artist John Heartfield made frequent use of Hitler's image as a target for his brand of barbed satire during Hitler's lifetime. In Fritz Lang's 1941 movie Man Hunt, which opened in theaters before America's entry into the war, Hitler is seen in the scope of a British hunter's rifle. In Ernst Lubitsch's 1942 films To Be or Not to Be (as well as in Mel Brooks' remake in 1983), an actor from a Polish stage group impersonates Hitler to enable the escape of the troupe to England.

Schichlegruber - Doing the Lambeth Walk, AKA Lambeth Walk - Nazi Style, a short propaganda spoof made in 1942 by Charles A. Ridley editing together clips from Triumph of the Will to make appear as if Hitler and other Nazis were marching to The Lambeth Walk (a dance craze that the Nazis despised).

One spoof of Hitler appeared in a short propaganda film created in 1942 by Charles A. Ridley of the British Ministry of Information that had among other names, Schichlegruber - Doing the Lambeth Walk and Lambeth Walk – Nazi Style. The film features footage of Hitler and other Nazis taken from Triumph of the Will and edited in such a way to make it appear they are marching and dancing to "The Lambeth Walk", a dance common at the time (including in Germany) but despised by the Nazis. The use of the footage was intended to give audiences is Britain and other Allied countries a good laugh and make Nazis angry. The film was distributed uncredited to various newsreel companies that gave the film other titles such as Hoch der Lambeth Valk: A Laugh-Time Interlude, Lambeth Walk - Nazi Style, Gen. Adolf Takes Over and Panzer Ballet. The newsreel companies would supply their own narration for the clip. When Nazi propaganda chief Joseph Goebbels saw this film, he ended up so enraged that he left the screening room kicking chairs and screaming profanities.

Apart from films, Hitler was the enemy of several comic book superheroes who battled Hitler directly or indirectly in comics published during World War II. Superheroes that fought Hitler include Superman, Captain America, the Shield, and Namor the Sub-Mariner. The front cover of Captain America Comics #1, Captain America's first appearance, showed him punching Hitler in the jaw. Captain America's archenemy, the Red Skull, was established as being an apprentice to Hitler. In Superman #15 the dictator Razan appeared, who attempted to invade a nearby democratic nation. Superman defeated his army, and Razan was shot while trying to escape.

One Superman story where Superman defeats Hitler is notable for triggering a response in an official Nazi media outlet. The story was called "How Superman would end the War" and was published not in a comic book but in Look magazine in 1940. The story was published with the full cooperation of Jerry Siegel and Joe Shuster, the creators of the Superman character. Both Siegel and Shuster were Jewish and therefore are considered enemies by Nazi Germany so while the United States was still officially neutral, Siegel and Shuster were not. "How Superman would end the War" is acknowledged in the magazine itself as outside of normal Superman continuity and non-canon. As implied by its title, "How Superman would end the War" is a story detailing a hypothetical scenario in which Superman intervenes in World War II. The story starts in the Siegfried Line where German soldiers see Superman flying towards them. Superman then lands and while the soldiers shoot at him, the bullets have no effect and bounce off. Superman puts an artillery gun out of service by using his super strength to tie a knot into the gun's barrel. After that, Superman flies away and when an airplane tries to stop him, he tears off the propeller, confusing the pilot. Superman continues his flight where he lands in Berlin and kidnaps Hitler (who complains about his kidnapping). Superman, while holding on to Hitler, flies to Moscow in the Soviet Union where he kidnaps another dictator, Joseph Stalin (at this point not yet in the war, he was against Hitler starting from 1941 onwards) and flies them both to the Palace of Nations, the League of Nations headquarters in Geneva, Switzerland. Hitler and Stalin are then both put on trial for war crimes including among others, the Nazi-Soviet joint occupation of Poland. This trial thus ends the war.

A Nazi in the United States had read the Look issue and Superman comic strip within it when it was published and alerted the SS newspaper Das Schwarze Korps to its contents. In April 1940, Das Schwarze Korps published an article condemning the comic strip, Superman and his co-creator Jerry Siegel personally. The article, titled "Jerry Siegel Attacks!" criticizes Superman as someone "with an overdeveloped body and underdeveloped mind" and in typical Nazi fashion, repeatedly uses anti-Semitic language to describe the story and denounce Siegel. Such language includes the opening sentence where Siegel is described as "an intellectually and physically circumcised chap". The article is also an attack on Siegel's own morals, claiming that he only created Superman to make money off him. Superman is further condemned when it mentions the scene of Hitler and Stalin handed over to the League of Nations and noting his superhero costume probably breaks the dress code in the building but that Superman ignores those rules "as well as the other laws of physics, logic, and life in general". The article ends with a final attack on Siegel where Das Schwarze Korps describes him as feeding "poison" on a daily basis to the hearts and minds of American children.

Hitler was mocked in satirical folk songs such as "Stalin Wasn't Stallin'" or when new lyrics were created to old songs such as "Hitler Has Only Got One Ball" (to the tune of the "Colonel Bogey March").

== Representations of Hitler after his death ==
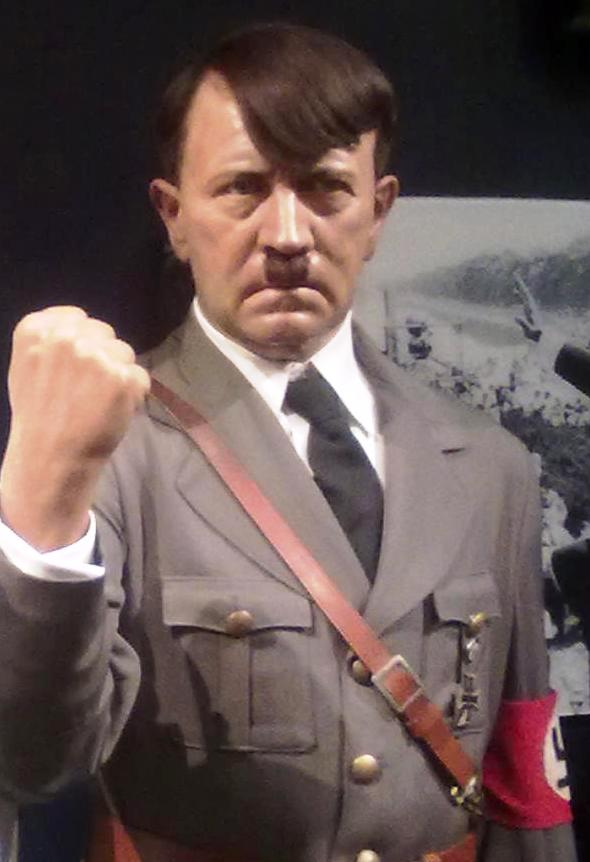
Wax model of Hitler at the Chamber of Horrors section in Madame Tussauds, London (pictured June 2011)

Hitler's last days have been depicted in several films, first in Der letzte Akt (1955), directed by Georg Wilhelm Pabst, starring Albin Skoda as the dictator; next was the fifth and final installment of the Soviet film series Liberation (1969–72), directed by Yuri Ozerov, starring Fritz Diez (an actor who commonly portrayed Hitler in a number of East German films from 1955 onwards). The Death of Adolf Hitler, a British (7 January 1973) made-for-television production, starring Frank Finlay in the title role, and Hitler: The Last Ten Days (1973), directed by Ennio De Concini, starring Sir Alec Guinness were the first Western contributions. The fifth iteration was the U.S. television film The Bunker (1981), directed by George Schaefer, starring Sir Anthony Hopkins. Finally, there was the Academy Award–nominated Downfall (2004), directed by Oliver Hirschbiegel and starring Bruno Ganz as Hitler. Also depicting Hitler's final hour in the bunker, the short film Hundert Jahre Adolf Hitler - Die letzte Stunde im Führerbunker (1989), directed by Christoph Schlingensief, starring Udo Kier.

Films covering periods in Hitler's life include, the television miniseries Inside the Third Reich (1982) starring Sir Derek Jacobi, who was nominated for an Emmy Award for his performance. Hitler was also portrayed in the film Valkyrie by David Bamber, which tells the story of the July 1944 bomb attempt on his life. Moloch (1999), directed by Alexander Sokurov, starring Leonid Mozgovoy, deals with Hitler's life on his Berghof mountain retreat near Berchtesgaden during the war, drawing heavily from Hitler's Table Talk published after the war. The 2003 television film Hitler: The Rise of Evil stars Robert Carlyle in the title role and depicts a semi-fictional account of Hitler's life.

Comedic examples of Hitler include comedy films such as Mel Brooks' 1968 comedy The Producers featured a satirical play-within-a-play called Springtime for Hitler, featuring dancing Nazis and songs about the conquest of Europe. Brooks' 1981 comedy, History of the World, Part I, featured "Hitler on Ice."

Hitler has also been portrayed in experimental films. Hitler: A Film from Germany (1978), a four part, 442-minute experimental film on Hitler, directed by Hans-Jürgen Syberberg, starring Heinz Schubert. A similar non-linear approach to Syberberg's, likening Hitler to a film director as well, was used in the film The Empty Mirror (1996), directed by Barry J. Hershey, starring Norman Rodway, which speculates that Hitler surviving World War II, lives in a secret subterranean bunker, and is today undergoing psychoanalysis conducted by Sigmund Freud.

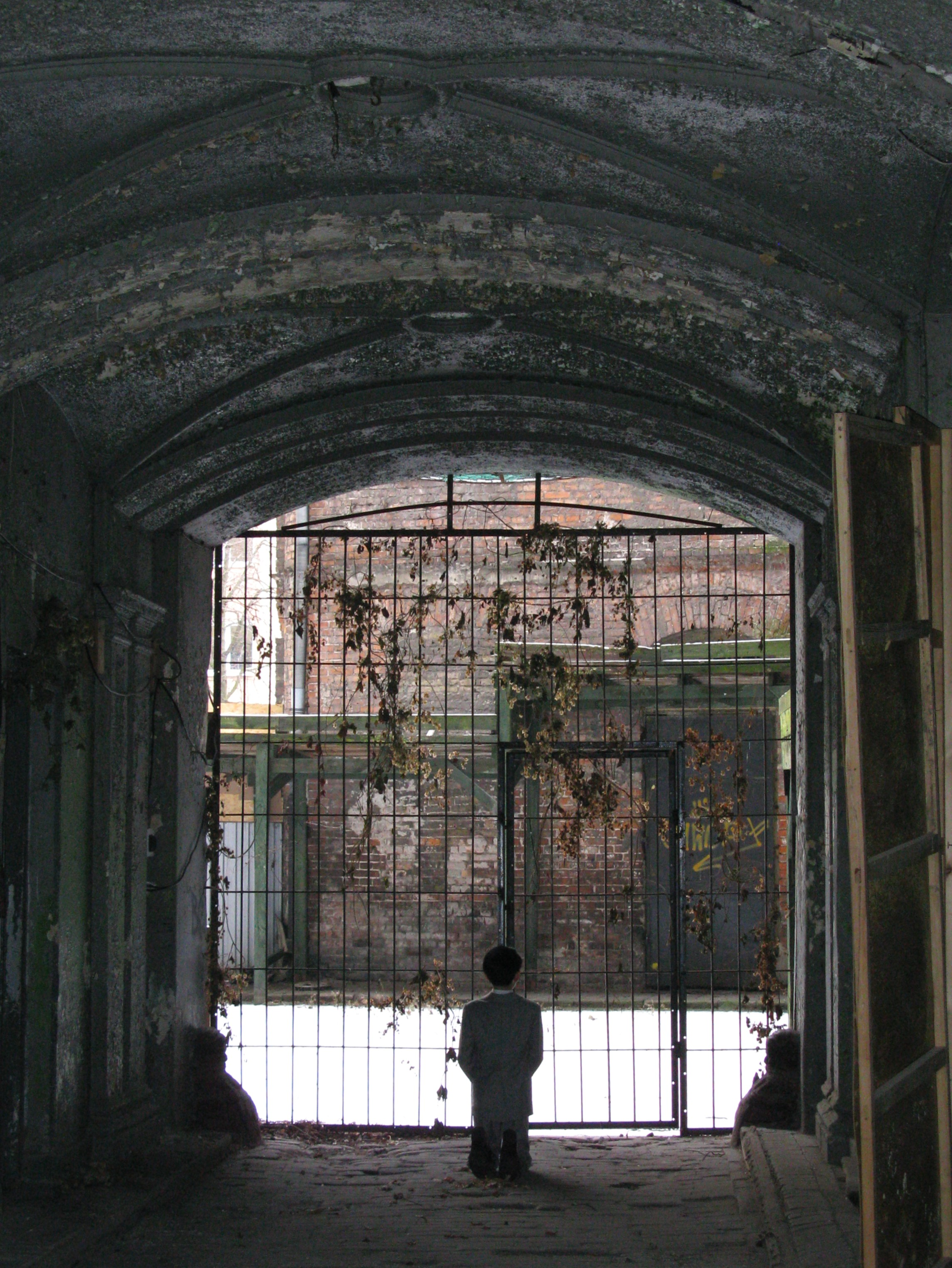
Him by Maurizio Cattelan (2001), depicting Adolf Hitler kneeling in prayer, exhibited in a courtyard in the former Warsaw Ghetto

Him (2001). by Maurizio Cattelan, is a sculpture resembling a schoolboy kneeling in prayer, except that the head has been replaced with the realistic likeness of Adolf Hitler. The sculpture was frequently displayed at the end of a long hallway or at the opposite end of a white room, turned away from the viewer so that they wouldn't be able to recognize the individual until they advanced close enough. The artist's proof of Him (2001) was sold at auction by Christie's in 2016 for $17,189,000.

Kosovar Emin Xhinovci has attracted considerable media attention for his striking resemblance to Hitler, and subsequent impersonation of him.

== Hitler in fiction ==
WorldCat lists 553 published books under this heading.

=== Novels ===
- The 1962 short story Genesis and Catastrophe: A True Story by Roald Dahl portrays an unhappy husband in Austria in 1889 whose wife is about to give birth. The father is pessimistic about the child's survival as their previous three children have all died in infancy. Rebuked by the doctor for his gloominess, his confidence is boosted by his wife's conviction that their new baby, a boy, will survive. The father names his newborn son Adolf Hitler.
- In the novel Young Adolf (1978) by English author Beryl Bainbridge, the 23-year-old Hitler travels to Liverpool to visit his English relatives.
- Ron Hansen's 1999 historical fiction novel Hitler's Niece parallels Hitler's rise to power in the 1920s and 1930s with his relationship with his niece (and secret mistress) Geli Raubal.
- In the novel Hunters in the Snow (2014) by English author D. M. Thomas, a young Hitler (going by the nom de guerre 'Wolf') becomes involved with Anna Freud and her father Sigmund whilst residing in Vienna.

Hitler appears in many alternate history novels.

- In Philip K. Dick's 1962 The Man in the High Castle, where the Axis Powers won the Second World War, America has been conquered and carved up between the Greater Germanic Reich and Imperial Japan, Hitler, after being stricken by the later stages of syphilis, was confined to a lunatic asylum shortly after World War II, and his place taken by Martin Bormann and, later, Joseph Goebbels and possibly Reinhard Heydrich. The Grasshopper Lies Heavy, by Hawthorne Abendsen, the story within the story, where the Allies won the war, in this timeline the United Kingdom contributes more to the Allied war effort, leading to joint British and Russian forces capturing Berlin, Hitler is also present at this Nuremberg trials and is eventually found guilty and executed for crimes against humanity.
- Similarly, in Eric Norden's 1973 The Ultimate Solution, Nazi Germany won the war and rules the world, but Hitler personally got little benefit of it. Having gone entirely mad, he is kept closely confined, constantly shouting at uncaring guards that he had been betrayed - while a double is taking his place in public ceremonies.
- In Nancy Kress' And Wild for to Hold, time-travelers intervene to change the past. Rather than assassinate Hitler, the humane emissaries from the future kidnap him alive from the year 1932, and keep him captive under comfortable conditions, preventing his rise to power in Germany.
- In Norman Spinrad's 1972 alternate history novel The Iron Dream, Hitler in the early 1920s stopped dabbling in politics, emigrated to America, learned English and became a well-known and respected science fiction pulp novelist - author of Lord of the Swastika, the text of which provides the bulk of the book.
- In the controversial 1981 novella The Portage to San Cristobal of A.H. by George Steiner Hitler survives the end of the war and escapes to the Amazon jungle, where he is found and tried by Nazi-hunters 30 years later. Hitler's defence is that since Israel owes its existence to the Holocaust, he is really the benefactor of the Jews.
- In Irving Wallace's The Seventh Secret (1985), Hitler and Eva Braun survive World War II by having doubles (a comedian named Manfred Müller and his girlfriend) murdered in their place, staging the murder to look like suicide.
- In Ira Levin's 1976 The Boys from Brazil, Hitler conspired with Josef Mengele to clone himself prior to his death. Using Hitler's blood, Mengele begins a project in the 1960s to clone several Hitlers and distribute the Hitler infants to families similar to that of the original. Mengele later attempts to recreate the sociological environment of Hitler's youth, beginning with killing the fathers of all the Hitler clones. Mengele's plan is to eventually create a second Hitler who will come of age in the 21st century and establish the Fourth Reich.
- Forged journals of Hitler, known as the Hitler Diaries, were published in West Germany by the magazine Stern in 1983.
- The 1995 Robert Ludlum novel The Apocalypse Watch meets its climax with the destruction of a Fourth Reich set in the 1990s, and the discovery of an ancient Adolf Hitler controlling a massive multinational corporation.
- Robert Harris' 1992 novel Fatherland is based on a fictional German victory in WWII and Hitler meeting with U.S. President Joseph P. Kennedy during the 1960s.
- In The Plot Against America (2004), Philip Roth envisions what life would have been like in the United States had Charles Lindbergh defeated Franklin D. Roosevelt and became president during the 1940s, allying America with Nazi Germany.
- Hitler is also the main 'protagonist' in the German dark satire novel Er ist wieder da ("Look Who's Back") by Timur Vermes, published in 2012. Hitler is shown to somehow reawaken, alive again, in Berlin of 2011 and, since no one believes him to really be Hitler, becomes a meme on YouTube as a Hitler impersonator.
- Lavie Tidhar's novel, A Man Lies Dreaming (2014) features a thinly-disguised Hitler (going by the nom de guerre 'Wolf' – which Hitler used during the 1920s) as a down-at-heels private eye in a 1930s London, in a world where the communists, rather than the Nazis, came to power in Germany.
- Newt Gingrich and William R. Forstchen's novel, 1945 (1995) Where the United States only went to war, and won against the Empire of Japan, allowing Nazi Germany to force a peace treaty with the Soviet Union, America has no interest in getting involved with the European conflict, even the British Empire with a German-dominated Europe at its doorstep, squander much of their resources on a colonial war in the former French Indochina, however when a meeting between Hitler and U.S. President Andrew Harrison goes bad, after the meeting in Reykjavík, Iceland, Hitler makes a plan to destroy the U.S. and U.K this involves, as part of the preparations, a beautiful German spy seduces and suborns the White House Chief of Staff and makes him a key German spy, and Erwin Rommel invading Scotland.
- James Herbert's novel, '48 (1996) before committing suicide, Hitler orders launches a biological weapon in the shape of a V-2 missile to wipe out all life on Earth.
- Stephen Fry's novel, Making History (1996) features two men, Michael Young and Professor Leo Zuckerman, who build a time machine, go back in time and put a permanent male contraceptive pill in Hitler's father's drink, making him infertile, thus Hitler is never born, however when they return to the present they discover they got rid of Hitler only to replace him with someone far worse, Rudolf Gloder.
- Hans Alfredson's novel, Attentatet i Pålsjö skog (1996) In 1941 Swedish Communists blow up a German train passing through Sweden, killing Eva Braun, leading Hitler to successfully invade Sweden, because of this Operation Barbarossa is delayed by three weeks allowing Joseph Stalin to be better prepared, the allied invasion of Normandy is in spring 1944 rather than June, in December that same year Hitler commits suicide, Sweden is liberated by joint British and Russian forces and the war ends a year earlier.
- In Fox on the Rhine by Douglas Niles and Michael Dobson (2000) Hitler is killed by Colonel Claus von Stauffenberg during Operation Valkyrie, however Heinrich Himmler stages his own coup and takes over.
- In Kim Newman' Dracula Cha Cha Cha (1998) In this world Count Dracula killed Abraham Van Helsing. Hitler sees the Vampire race as unclean and non-Aryan, Hitler blames Dracula who was the Supreme War Command of the Central Powers during World War I. Dracula helps the Allies of World War II with a revolution in Transylvania.
- Guy Walters' The Leader (2003), King Edward VIII never abdicates, marries Wallis Simpson, leading to Oswald Mosley win(ning the 1935 election, allying the United Kingdom with the Axis powers, Mosley conspires with Hitler to join him in the Final Solution.
- In Katherine Applegate's series Animorphs, Adolf Hitler makes an appearance in the third book of the spinoff series Megamorphs as an alternate version of himself where he is but a mere driver for the French-German troops.
- Harry Turtledove frequently uses alternate history in his novels, including Adolf Hitler. "Uncle Alf" features Hitler as a Sergeant in the Feldgendarmerie, In the Presence of Mine Enemies has an axis victory and the Fuhrer is the most powerful man in the world. In The War That Came Early Hitler is assassinated and the Nazi Government overthrown in a Coup d'etat. The Worldwar series (1993–2004) imagines an alien invasion of Earth during World War II. Hitler sends Joachim von Ribbentrop to negotiate and armistice between the Axis and Allied powers, and remains Fuhrer until his death, he is succeeded by Heinrich Himmler.
- Jo Walton's Farthing in this alternative history Rudolf Hess's flight to Scotland in May 1941 manages to successfully negotiate peace terms with the United Kingdom, mainly because the United States never gets involved with the conflict, this is because Imperial Japan never attacks Pearl Harbor, resulting in the British Empire pulling out of the war, and by 1949, Britain has also become a fascist dictatorship, the sequel Ha'penny the main character Inspector Peter Carmichael, has to stop an attempt to kill Hitler as he comes to London as part of the two countries new friendship.
- In Philip Kerr's Hitler's Peace (2005) Hitler, realising he is going to lose the war, tries to negotiate peace with Franklin D. Roosevelt, Joseph Stalin, and Winston Churchill.
- In Guy Saville's The Afrika Reich (2011) the United Kingdom is defeated by Nazi Germany during the Dunkirk Campaign, Lord Halifax becomes Prime Minister and signs a non-aggression pact with Germany ending the war. 1952 the two empires have carved up Africa between themselves. The Madagaskar Plan Hitler is deporting Jews as part of the Madagascar Plan.
- In Len Deighton's XPD A group of former SS officers attempt to seize power in West Germany, in which they intend to publish some wartime documents about a secret meeting between Winston Churchill and Hitler in June 1940.
- In Mike Resnick's 1992 alternate history anthology Alternate Presidents. In the short story "A Fireside Chat" by Jack Nimersheim Hitler becomes Chancellor of Germany earlier than in real life and in 1925 establishes an alliance with Franklin D. Roosevelt to maintain the balance of power. In the short story "Truth, Justice, and the American Way" by Lawrence Watt-Evans In 1938, Hitler was overthrown and killed by a cabal of generals, and Hermann Göring succeeded him as the second Führer, continuing to serve in that position until at least 1953. In the short story "Kingfish" by Barry N. Malzberg, Huey Long (who avoids his 1935 assassination) wins the presidential election of 1936 as an independent. Long invites Hitler to Washington in 1938 and assassinates him via a bomb, leading to a war between the U.S. and Nazi Germany.
- In Patrick Sheane Duncan's Dracula vs. Hitler (2016), a sequel to Bram Stoker's Dracula, vampire hunter Abraham Van Helsing awakens Dracula in 1941 to fight the Nazis in Romania.
- In John Birmingham Axis of Time trilogy, a US-led multinational task force of advanced warships and submarines in 2021 deployment, the Nagoya conducts a full-scale test of its new systems but there is a catastrophic accident—the experiment generates a massive rift in the time-space continuum, completely destroying the Nagoya and sending most of the fleet back in time to 1942. in the third novel Final Impact (2007), Hitler has a seizure and suffers permanent brain and muscle damage; with the T4 program in mind, Heinrich Himmler chooses to suffocate him.

=== Theatre ===
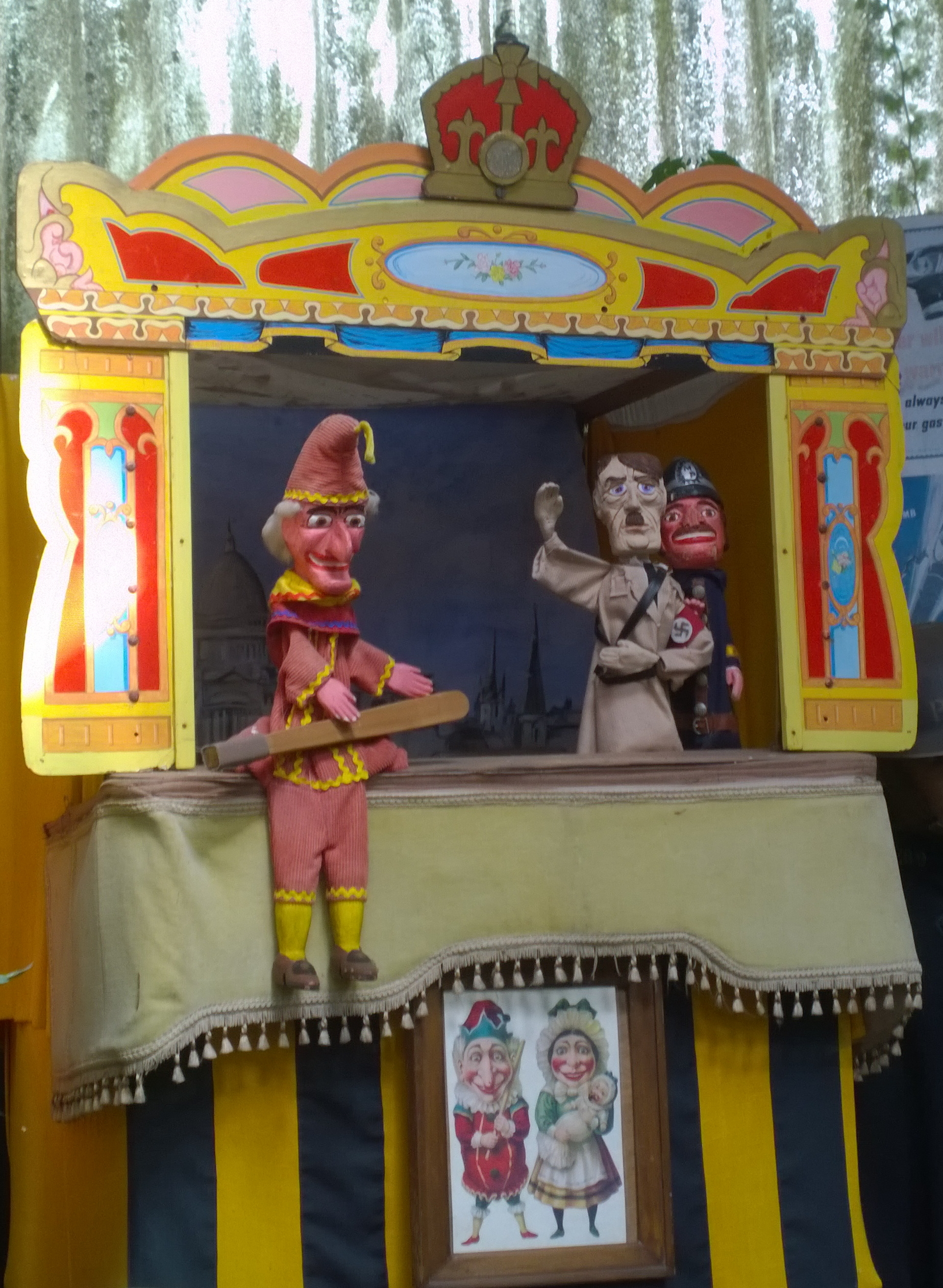
Hitler character appearing in a Punch and Judy puppet show in England

Hitler made it onto the stage through Japanese novelist Yukio Mishima, who wrote a play called My Friend Hitler (Wagatomo Hitora), retelling the Night of the Long Knives. Moreover, the Hungarian writer George Tabori wrote a comedy called Mein Kampf which portrayed Hitler as a poor young man who enters Vienna, wanting to become an artist. Hitler appears as a minor character in Stanley Eveling's The Dead of Night, set above the Führerbunker as the Russians are entering Berlin. Dr Freud Will See You Now Mr Hitler (2008) was a radio drama by Laurence Marks and Maurice Gran presenting an imagined scenario in which Sigmund Freud treats the young Hitler. Toby Jones played Hitler. Utpal Dutt's 1975 Bengali play Barricade is set in the time that Hitler is rising to power.

In 2021, Gamma Ray Theatre launched their debut production "Ay Up, Hitler!" Written by Hampshire playwright David McCulloch, the play tells the untold "true" story of how Hitler and other high-ranking members of the Third Reich, actually escaped Germany at the end of the war, and went into hiding in Yorkshire. The play was praised for its 'outrageous satire' and was described as a 'riotous hour of innovative theatre.' It made its Edinburgh Fringe Debut in 2023, achieving a sell-out run.

== Motion pictures ==
=== Film ===
- Bobby Watson played Hitler in
  - The Devil with Hitler (1942)
  - Hitler – Dead or Alive (1942)
  - That Nazty Nuisance (1943)
  - The Miracle of Morgan's Creek (1944)
  - The Hitler Gang (1944)
  - A Foreign Affair (1948)
  - The Story of Mankind (1957)
  - On the Double (1961)
  - The 4 Horsemen of the Apocalypse (1962)
- The Ace of Aces (1982), Günter Meisner plays Hitler and his half-sister Angela
- Blazing Saddles (1974): an actor playing Hitler in a film eats at the Warner Bros. commissary
- Blubberella (2011): played by the film's director, Uwe Boll
- The Boys from Brazil (1978): a madman clones Hitler
- The Bunker (1981), played by Anthony Hopkins
- BloodRayne: The Third Reich (2011), played by Boris Bakal
- Bosko's Picture Show (1933): Hitler chases Jimmy Durante with an axe.
- Captain America: The First Avenger (2011): Steve Rogers performs in a war bond tour in which he "knocks out" Hitler; he tells the members of Bucky Barnes' unit that he has "knocked out Adolf Hitler over 200 times!".
- Carl Ekberg played Hitler in
  - Citizen Kane (1941)
  - Man Hunt (1941)
  - The Wife Takes a Flyer (1942)
  - Once Upon a Honeymoon (1942)
  - What Did You Do in the War, Daddy? (1966)
- Chaplin (1992): Charlie Chaplin refuses to shake hands with a man discussing Hitler at a party and discusses him with his brother Sidney during pre-production on The Great Dictator
- Countdown to War (1989), played by Ian McKellen
- The Crazy Adventure (1965), played by Andrew Hughes: Hitler escapes Berlin and travels via U-boat to his secret base located on an island near Japan where he remains making missiles to destroy his adversaries until the Crazy Cats discover the location decades later.
- Daffy – The Commando (1943): Daffy Duck hits Hitler on the head with a mallet
- Deadpool 2 (2018): In the post-credits scene of the film's extended cut, Deadpool uses Cable's time-travel device to kill Hitler as a baby.
- Dear Friend Hitler (2011), played by Raghuvir Yadav
- The Death of Adolf Hitler (1973), played by Frank Finlay
- Elser – Er hätte die Welt verändert (2015), directed by Oliver Hirschbiegel. Hitler is played by Udo Schenk and the film is based on the assassination attempt at Bürgerbräukeller.
- Fritz Diez played Hitler in
  - Ernst Thälmann – Führer seiner Klasse (1955)
  - Frozen Flashes (1967)
  - I, Justice (1967)
  - Liberation (1970–1)
  - Seventeen Moments of Spring (1973)
  - Take Aim (1974)
  - Soldiers of Freedom (1977)
- Dragon Ball Z: Fusion Reborn (1995): Hitler escapes from Hell and attempts to take over a city
- The Empty Mirror (1996), played by Norman Rodway
- Europa, Europa (1990), played by Ryszard Pietruski
- Fatherland (1994), directed by Christopher Menaul
- Fullmetal Alchemist the Movie: Conqueror of Shamballa (2005): Edward Elric learns from Lang that the Thule Society plans to use the weapons from his world to help Hitler in his attempt to start a revolution
- Hitler Goes Kaput! (2008), played by Mikhail Krylov
- The Good Shepherd (2006): Fredericks takes Wilson to a meeting where Hitler is discussed; Murach recruits Wilson to expose Fredericks as a Nazi
- The Great Dictator (1940): Adenoid Hynkel is a parody of Hitler
- Hellboy (2004): New BPRD agent John Myers is told Hitler died in 1958, not in 1945
- Hitler (1962), played by Richard Basehart
- Hitler, ein Film aus Deutschland (1977) documentary by Hans-Jürgen Syberberg
- Hitler: The Last Ten Days (1973), played by Alec Guinness
- Hitler Umanath (1982): a timid man who resembles Hitler becomes a leader
- Hitler's SS: Portrait in Evil (1985), played by Colin Jeavons
- The Three Stooges Moe Howard parodied Hitler as "Moe Hailstone" in two of the Stooges' short subject films:
  - You Nazty Spy!, the first Hollywood film work to lampoon Hitler, released nine months (January 1940) before The Great Dictator
  - I'll Never Heil Again, the sequel to You Nazty Spy! (released July 1941)
- Inglourious Basterds (2009), played by Martin Wuttke
- Iron Sky: The Coming Race Hitler is played by Udo Kier and is the leader of an alien race called the Vril.
- Is Paris Burning (1966), played by Billy Frick
- Es geschah am 20. Juli (1955), directed by G. W. Pabst
- Jojo Rabbit (2019), played by Taika Waititi, the film's director: he appears as the imaginary friend of Hitler Youth member Johannes 'Jojo' Betzler, initially behaving in a friendly and childlike manner, but becoming more like the real-life dictator as Jojo develops sympathy for a runaway Jewish girl named Elsa and increasingly questions Nazi doctrine. After the real Hitler's suicide, Jojo erases the imaginary Adolf by visualizing himself kicking him out a window.
- The King's Man (2021), played by David Kross
- The King's Speech (2010), King George VI watches a newsreel of Hitler giving a speech
- King of Hearts, young Corporal Adolf played by Philippe de Broca suggests burning a French town.
- A Kitten for Hitler (2007) by Ken Russell
- Jorma Taccone played Hitler in
  - Kung Fury (2015)
  - Kung Fury 2 (2020)
- Luther Adler played Hitler in
  - The Magic Face (1951)
  - The Desert Fox (1951)
- The Man Who Crossed Hitler (2011), played by Ian Hart
- Look Who's Back (2015), played by Oliver Masucci
- Max (2002), played by Noah Taylor
- Meet the People (1944), played by Frederick Giermann
- Mein Kampf (2009), played by Tom Schilling
- Moloch (1999), directed by Alexander Sokurov
- Night Train to Munich (1940), played by Billy Russell
- The Plot to Kill Hitler (1990), played by Mike Gwilym
- The Producers (1968): two men agree to produce a Broadway play about Hitler, hoping it will flop
- Star Spangled Rhythm (1942), played by Tom Dugan
- The Strange Death of Adolf Hitler (1943), played by Ludwig Donath
- Udo Schenk played Hitler in
  - Netaji Subhas Chandra Bose: The Forgotten Hero (2004)
  - Stauffenberg (2004)
- Michael Sheard played Hitler in
  - The Tomorrow People (1973)
  - Rogue Male (1976)
  - The Dirty Dozen: Next Mission (1985)
  - Indiana Jones and the Last Crusade (1989)
  - Secret History (2003)
- Timecop 2: The Berlin Decision (2003): a member of the Time Enforcement Commission travels back in time to assassinate Hitler
- Tomorrow I'll Wake Up and Scald Myself with Tea (1977), time travel comedy, directed by Jindřich Polák
- They Saved Hitler's Brain (1969): Nazi madmen preserve Hitler's brain so they can resurrect him
- The Fall of Berlin (1950) played by Vladimir Savelyev
- Der 20. Juli (1955), directed by Falk Harnack
- Der Untergang (English: Downfall) (2004), played by Bruno Ganz
- Valkyrie (2008), played by David Bamber
- War and Remembrance (1988), played by Steven Berkoff
- White Tiger (2012), directed by Karen Shakhnazarov
- The Winds of War (1983), played by Gunter Meisner
- Which Way to the Front? (1970): a comedy film about the 20 July Plot.

=== Television ===
- Doctor Who (1963-): Hitler is played by Albert Welling) in Let's Kill Hitler, the eighth episode of series 6.
- Monty Python sketch "Mr. Hitler and the North Minehead By-Election" (1970): Hitler, Himmler and Von Ribbentrop plot their political comeback at a B&B in a remote British constituency.
- The Simpsons (1989-): In the episode "Bart vs. Australia" (1995), Bart Simpson calls an elderly man in Argentina who is implied to be Adolf Hitler while attempting to confirm the Coriolis effect.
- Heil Honey I'm Home! (1990). Played by Neil McCaul. This British sitcom, which centred on Adolf Hitler and Eva Braun moving live next door to a Jewish couple, Arny and Rosa Goldenstein, was deemed so controversial it was cancelled after one episode.
- Horrible Histories (2009-): Played by Ben Willbond
- Danger 5 (2012–2015): Allied spies chase after Hitler, who is inexplicably still alive in the 1960s–1980s.
- The Man in the High Castle (2015): An old Hitler makes an appearance in an alternative world where the Axis Powers won World War II.
- Man Seeking Woman (2015–2017): The main character's ex-girlfriend is seen dating an old Hitler on the first episode of the first season.
- In March 2016 Sarah Silverman portrayed Hitler on Conan to mock Donald Trump.
- Gilbert Gottfried played Hitler in the Anne Frank episode of Jeff Ross's Historical Roasts. Comedian Rachel Feinstein concludes the roast by addressing "Hitler" saying "Today the Jewish people are thriving more than ever before. In fact, guess what, Hitler: You're being portrayed by a Jew right now, and it's the loudest, most annoying Jew we could find!"
- Hunters: In the late 1970s Hitler (portrayed by Udo Kier) escaped the defeat of Nazi Germany and is living in Argentina with Eva Braun and their 4 look-alike male children in the late 1970s. Together Hitler and Eva plan to attack America and create the Fourth Reich.{rp|181}
- The Goes Wrong Show (2019-2021): In the Series 1 episode "The Pilot (Not the Pilot)", the character Robert Grove (played by Henry Lewis) portrays Hitler.

==== Documentaries ====
- The World at War (1974): a Thames Television series which contains much information about Hitler and Nazi Germany, including an interview with his secretary, Traudl Junge
- "Adolf Hitler's Last Days": from the BBC series Secrets of World War II, the episode tells the story of Hitler's last days
- The Nazis: A Warning from History (1997): six-part BBC TV series on how cultured and educated Germans accepted Hitler and the Nazis. Historical consultant was Ian Kershaw
- Im toten Winkel – Hitlers Sekretärin (Blind Spot: Hitler's Secretary) (2002): a 90-minute interview with Traudl Junge. Made by Austrian Jewish director André Heller shortly before Junge's death from lung cancer. Junge recalls the last days in the Berlin bunker. Clips of the interview were used in Downfall.
- Undergångens arkitektur (The Architecture of Doom) (1989): documentary about the National Socialist aesthetic as envisioned by Hitler
- Das Fernsehen unter dem Hakenkreuz (Television Under the Swastika) (1999): documentary by Michael Kloft about the use of television in Nazi Germany for propaganda purposes from 1935 to 1944
- Hitler: The Rise of Evil (2003): two-part TV series about the early years of Adolf Hitler and his rise to power (up to 1933), starring Robert Carlyle.
- Ruins of the Reich (2007): a four-part series detailing the rise and fall of Hitler's Reich, created by historian R.J. Adams
- Apocalypse: Hitler (2011): a two-part television series chronicling the rise of Adolf Hitler and the birth of Nazi ideology

=== Comics and cartoons ===
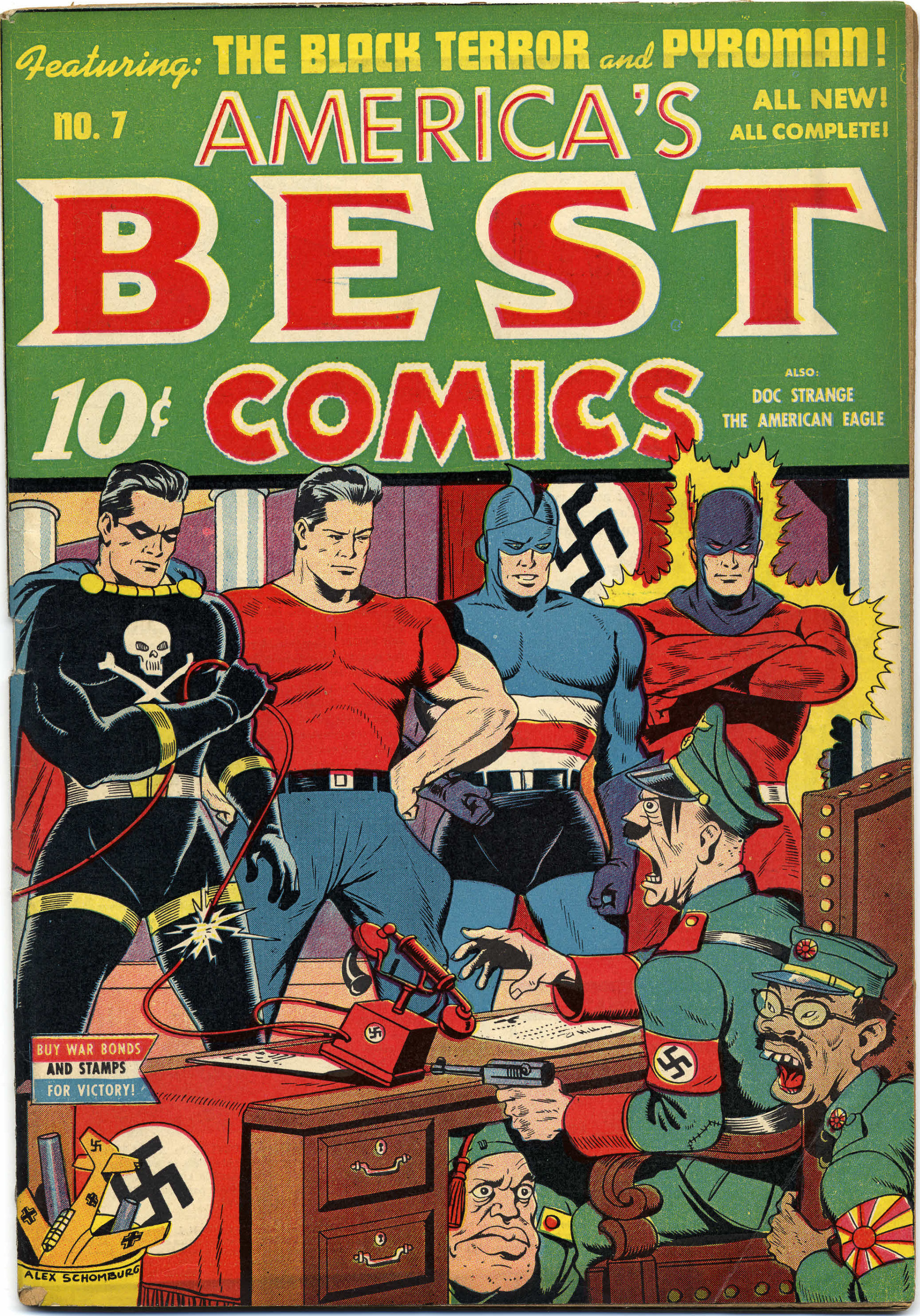
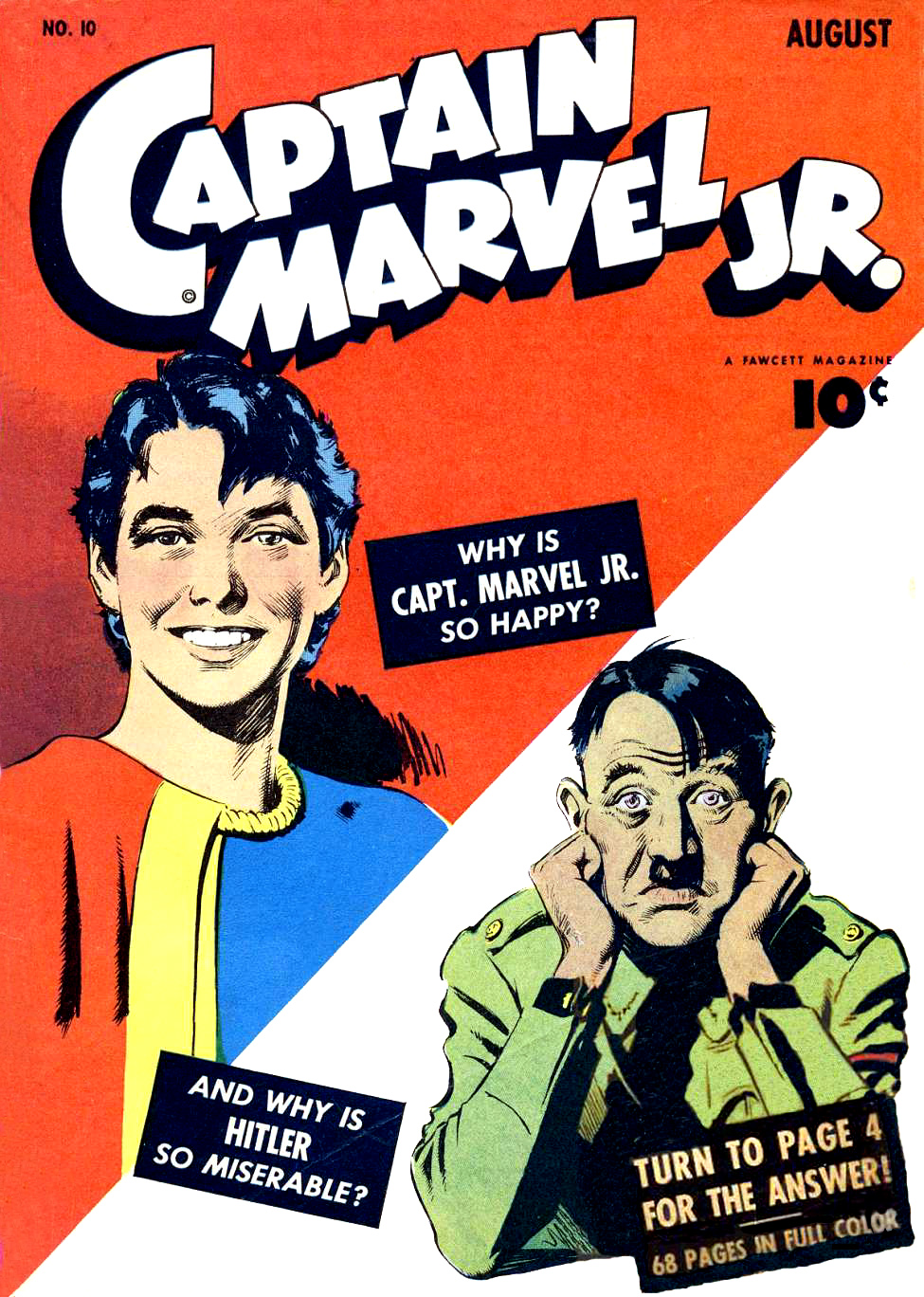
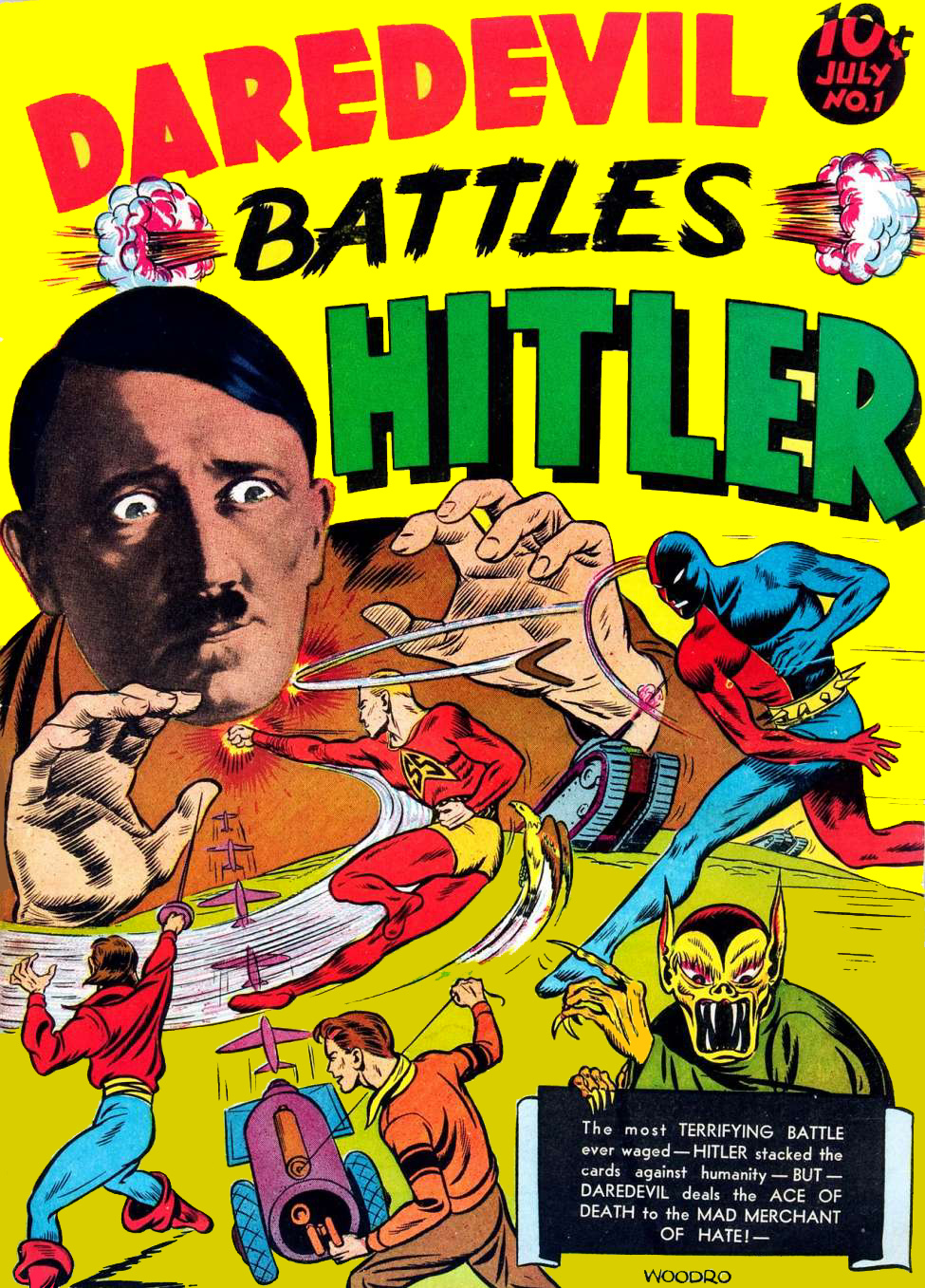
Depictions of Adolf Hitler in American comic books during World War II. Clockwise from upper left: America's Best Comics #7 October 1943, "Why is Hitler so miserable?" Captain Marvel Jr. #10, August 1943. Artwork by Mac Rayboy, Daredevil Battles Hitler, July 1941, Lev Gleason Publications. Cover art by "Woodro" (Charles Biro and Bob Wood), Captain America Comics #1 (March 1941). Cover art by Joe Simon (inks and pencils) and Jack Kirby (pencils).

DC Comics feature Hitler on several occasions. In Strange Adventures #3 (December 1950-January 1951), there is a story in which Hitler is captured by space aliens just before his attempted suicide. A fake corpse is left for the SS to find. As punishment for Hitler's crimes, he is imprisoned for life alone on a rocket ship which will travel through space until he dies (the rocket ship can automatically manufacture its own food for him); during his waking hours, he is forced to listen to an endless loop recording of all the speeches he has ever made. The character known as the Unknown Soldier, who first appeared in June 1966, kills Hitler, impersonates him for a short time, then pretends his death was a suicide. In Adventures of the Outsiders #33-35, a clone of Hitler is created by Baron Bedlam. Planning to give the clone the same persona as the original, Bedlam gives him an intellectually disabled Jewish maid, several films of the Holocaust and a handgun, Bedlam's intention being for the clone to embrace Nazism and ultimately murder the maid to "prove himself" as Hitler. Instead, the clone—realizing his connection to the atrocities he views—commits suicide.

In DC Comics' Elseworlds imprint, The Golden Age, Hitler's brain is successfully transplanted into the brain pan of Dyna-Mite. Now pretending to be a superhero called Dynaman, he plots in resurrecting Nazi ideals with the aid of the Ultra-Humanite. He possessed a magical item, the Spear of Destiny, which gave him control over superpowered beings that entered Nazi territory, an explanation for why the Justice Society of America did not enter Berlin and end the war.

In Fawcett pre-Crisis comics, he was a member of the Monster Society of Evil with Benito Mussolini and Hideki Tojo, and other Nazis like Herr Phoul were other members of the Society. He was shown to have helped in the creation of super-strong Aryan supervillain Captain Nazi.

In Weird War Tales #58 (1977) "Death of a dictator" Hitler kills a raving man dressed in rags before going into suspended animation in the belief history will repeat and he will be able to rebuild the Third Reich. The story ends with our Hitler with long hair being killed in exactly the same manner the raving man dressed in rags was. The final panel reveals that the scientist was all too correct in that history would repeat as our Hitler's killer looks exactly like he did originally and he is going to his suspended animation chamber and these events will replay themselves forever.

In the comic book The Savage Dragon by Erik Larsen (published by Image Comics), Hitler did not die in 1945, but after a fight against Hellboy in Romania in 1952. His body ruined, the brain is transplanted to the body of a large gorilla. Suffering amnesia and calling himself Brainiape, the chimera possesses great psionic powers and joins the Chicago, IL criminal organization known as the Vicious Circle, eventually becoming its leader. He remembers his past only in 1996 when he encounters Hellboy again, alongside the Vicious Circle's enemy, the meta-talented policeman called Dragon. The ape body is killed, and it is revealed that Hitler's brain had mutated and could live unaided by any technology or host body, ambulatory on tiny legs.

Marvel Comics' villain the Hate-Monger is revealed to be the consciousness of Hitler transferred to a cloned body by Nazi scientist Arnim Zola. The original Hitler, rather than committing suicide, was confronted by the Human Torch and his sidekick Toro after Eva Braun committed suicide. The two heroes set Hitler ablaze as he attempted to set off a bomb. As he died, he commanded one of his loyal followers nearby to tell the world he had committed suicide. The clone is killed in Fantastic Four #21 when the Invisible Girl makes him hit his own troops with his hate-ray, causing them to shoot him for getting them into a battle with the Fantastic Four. At the time of his death, he was planning to start wars using a ray which caused hatred and to which only he possessed the antidote to, having started with a South American country. He preached ideas of bigotry also while in America. In another story, Hitler is seen in the Hellish realm of the demon Mephisto. In the British comic 2000 AD a storyline called The Shicklgruber Grab from Strontium Dog mutant bounty hunters Johnny Alpha and Wulf Sternhammer are hired to go back to 1945 and bring Hitler to the future the stand trial, Hitler who murdered Eva Braun shortly after marrying her, and used his simpleton body double to commit suicide so he could escape and start the Fourth Reich, however gets dragged to the future not understanding what's going on.

Warner Bros. produced wartime cartoons which constantly parodied Hitler and his personality traits and quirks. Most (if not all) cartoons with Hitler and the Nazis as the antagonists ended up with the American hero cartoon character (such as Bugs Bunny or Daffy Duck) making a mockery out of Hitler.

Metro-Goldwyn-Mayer produced an episode in their Tom and Jerry series called "The Lonesome Mouse" in 1943, with Tom's face being painted to resemble Hitler, before Jerry spit on it.

Hitler appears as an antagonist in the Captain Planet and the Planeteers episode "A Good Bomb Is Hard to Find", voiced by Matt Frewer.

Japanese manga artist Shigeru Mizuki wrote Gekiga Hitler, first serialized in Weekly Manga Sunday in 1971 and published in English in 2015 as Shigeru Mizuki's Hitler by Drawn & Quarterly.

The episode "Alternative Histories", from the Netflix animated series Love, Death & Robots, centers in five scenarios where an alternative death of the dictator occurs.

In the comic book series The League of Extraordinary Gentlemen by Alan Moore, set in an alternate universe where several other works of fiction are real, Adenoid Hynkel, the Hitler spoof played by Charlie Chaplin in his film The Great Dictator, is a real person and has the same role in the comic series that Hitler had in real life. In the world of The League of Extraordinary Gentlemen, Tomainia (the country Hynkel ruled in The Great Dictator) was annexed by Nazi Germany in a similar manner to the Anschluss and the "Double Cross" emblem used in the film for Hynkel-controlled Tomainia is instead used as the Nazi flag instead of the Swastika in reality, meaning that this version of Hynkel is not exactly the same as the film. The personality of the comic book Hynkel combines the buffoonish mentality of the film Hynkel with the evil tyranny of Hitler both in real life and in the various fictional works that depict him. Hynkel is mentioned in passing in Volume III: Century but only appears as a character in Nemo: The Roses of Berlin which is part of the Nemo Trilogy. Nemo: The Roses of Berlin also mentions that an American comedian named "Addie Hitler" has made a movie that mocked Hynkel's regime, an obvious reference to The Great Dictator.

Belgian comic series The Adventures of Nero shows two incarnations of Hitler having survived the war: once in "De man met het gouden hoofd" where he is pictured living hidden in an igloo in the American Far North, and again in "Het knalgele koffertje" which pictures him on an unidentified Pacific Island.

British comic series 2000 AD in the Strontium Dog stories, mutant bounty hunters Johnny Alpha and Wulf Sternhammer from the 22nd century go back in time to 1945 to bring Hitler back with them to stand trial. Hitler, who murdered Eva Braun and had his simpleton body double commit suicide to fake his death, so he could escape. Alpha and Sternhammer eventually capture Hitler and bring him back with them.

== Hitler in music ==
Many songs tell a story about Hitler one way or the other, for example "Götterdämmerung" by Stratovarius directly mentions the history of Hitler and the Nazi regime. David Bowie has also been quoted saying "Hitler was the first rock star" and, at one time, wanted to direct a film based on the life of Heinrich Himmler. "Heads We're Dancing" by Kate Bush tells the story of a woman who dances all night with a charming stranger, only to discover the following morning that he is Adolf Hitler. Texas Groove metal band Pantera wrote and recorded a song called "By Demons Be Driven". It tells the story of how Hitler was plagued by paranoia and began to hate the Jewish people and religion. Australian band TISM's debut single was "Defecate on My Face", which was about Adolf Hitler's supposed coprophilia. Australian comedy troupe the Doug Anthony Allstars had a song called "Mexican Hitler", which told the story of what Hitler would have been like if he was born Mexican. It made an appearance in their television show, DAAS Kapital.

The song "Hitler as Kalki" by apocalyptic folk band Current 93 makes use of Savitri Devi's idea that Hitler was an avatar of the Hindu god Kalki. "Two Little Hitlers" by Elvis Costello, superficially a song about a loveless couple but reportedly a real-life reflection of the relationship between the singer and his producer Nick Lowe (who had previously recorded a song entitled "Little Hitler", the similarities leading to speculations about the origins of the later song) on the album Armed Forces. Antony and the Johnsons have released the song "Hitler in My Heart" on their debut in which the term "Hitler" is generally used as a metaphore for the bad within oneself - likewise in the song "Crack Hitler" by Faith No More from Angel Dust.

American rapper Westside Gunn released a series of mixtapes named Hitler Wears Hermes. He later said that the title was inspired by the movie The Devil Wears Prada.

In 2012, British synth-pop duo Pet Shop Boys released a song called Hell, which mentions various famous people who have made a name for themselves in history through acts of violence, including Hitler.

Other songs take a more serious approach and deal with Hitler's impact on the world. Thrash metal group Flotsam and Jetsam recorded the song "Der Fuhrer" for their album Doomsday for the Deceiver. The song discusses the devastation Hitler caused in Europe. New York metal band Anthrax recorded the song "The Enemy" for their album Spreading the Disease. The song discusses Hitler's role in the Holocaust.

There are some examples of parodies involving Hitler. Bing Crosby and the Andrews Sisters reference Hitler in the song, Hot Time in the Town of Berlin. "Der Fuehrer's Face" is an elaborate parody on Nazism created by musical comedian Spike Jones. It is one of his most well-known tunes. A novelty rap song entitled "To Be or Not to Be (The Hitler Rap)" performed by Mel Brooks is on the movie To Be or Not to Be's soundtrack album, but it was not in the movie itself. Mel Brooks dressed as Hitler sings from behind a desk while male dancers in pants, harnesses and SS caps made of black leather and female dancers in fishnet stockings dance wildly with each other around Hitler on a large dance floor with a checkerboard design.

The heavy metal band Gwar has maimed and mangled a Hitler character during many live stage shows.

Songs about Adolf Hitler include:

- "Adolf Hitler" by Clifford Morris, better known as the Mighty Destroyer
- "Mr. Hitler" by Lead Belly
- "Hot Time in the Town of Berlin" by Bing Crosby and the Andrews Sisters
- "Defecate on My Face", by TISM
- "Even Hitler Had a Girlfriend" by Mr. T Experience
- "Der Fuehrer's Face" by Spike Jones
- "Heads We're Dancing" by Kate Bush
- "Hitler Has Only Got One Ball" — World War II British soldiers marching song
- "Springtime for Hitler" from the film and play The Producers by Mel Brooks
- "WW3" and "Heil Hitler" by Kanye West

== Internet ==
Parodied clips from the 2004 film Downfall have proliferated internationally via YouTube and other video sites. The parodies replace the subtitles from the original movie with incorrect subtitles. The most frequently used clips include the scene where Hitler receives news of the advancing Red Army vastly outnumbering the forces commanded by Felix Steiner, and where Hitler orders Otto Günsche to find SS-Gruppenführer Hermann Fegelein. They are subtitled with references to Hitler becoming angry over various facets of modern pop culture such as politics, online gaming, films, television, music, sports and many other local or international events.

The phenomenon started in English but has spread to other languages including Japanese (massive number of videos on Nico Nico Douga on various topics), Chinese (influenced by Japan, comments on Wenzhou train collision and many other sensational topics mainly on Tudou and Youku. In addition, Hong Kong people used the clip to criticize social events, like Cable TV un-subscription, salt shortage due to misbelief of salt being able to protect from radiation from the Fukushima nuclear disaster), Bulgarian (to ridicule Bulgarian president Georgi Parvanov for being a State Security agent during the communist dictatorship and for being a poacher), Romanian (for the 2009 presidential election), Croatian (comments about frequent affairs in the government), Serbian (regarding poor results by football team FK Red Star), French (about the weather), Spanish (about a wide variety of topics mainly related to Argentine and Chilean local events), Indonesian (mainly about local politics, presidential elections, cultures, and also everyday life), and Hebrew (about the difficulty of finding parking space in Tel Aviv).

Footage or characters from other films, ranging from other depictions of Hitler in the likes of Inglourious Basterds or Hitler: The Last Ten Days, or even films that have little or nothing to do with Downfall, are also juxtaposed for humorous effect.

On April 21, 2010, Constantin Film, the production and distribution company responsible for the film, initiated a massive removal of parody videos on YouTube. This removal was criticized by digital rights advocates and was followed by the appearance of self-referential parody videos on the very subject of Constantin's actions with respect to the parodies.

In the shared alternate history of Ill Bethisad (1997 and after), Adolf Hitler never went into politics but instead moved to New Amsterdam (Ill Bethisad's version of New York City) and wrote science fiction, in a similar manner to the version of Hitler depicted in the novel The Iron Dream. Unlike in real life or The Iron Dream, the fictional alternate universe of Hitler was never anti-Semitic. Hitler actually liked the Jewish people he met early in life in Vienna, preventing his anti-Semitism. Hitler also created the alternate history genre in Ill Bethisad and his most famous work there, The Dream of Iron, is an example of one. The villains of The Dream of Iron are the "Empire of Zand" which resemble the Nazis.

The website Cats That Look Like Hitler features pictures of cats that bear some resemblance to the German leader.

Godwin's Law states "As an online discussion grows longer, the probability of a comparison involving Nazis or Hitler approaches one". From this is derived an additional formulation, also encountered online, which states "The first person to mention the Third Reich automatically loses the argument".

In 2010, Hitler has been portrayed by EpicLLOYD in the second episode of YouTube series Epic Rap Battles of History, "Darth Vader vs Hitler", where he faces Darth Vader (portrayed by co-creator Nice Peter) in a rap battle. In 2011, in Season two's first episode, "Hitler vs. Vader 2", EpicLLOYD and Nice Peter reprised their roles in a second rap battle between Darth Vader and Hitler and again for the start of season three, in the episode "Hitler vs. Vader 3", which was uploaded on October 7, 2013, on the series' YouTube channel.

In 2012, the statement "Hitler did nothing wrong" (HDNW) became an Internet meme varyingly for trolling, support of Hitler, and/or Holocaust denial. Its use on the internet was popularized by 4chan after members of the website attacked an ad campaign ran by Mountain Dew.

In 2013, a kettle, which was dubbed the "Hitler teapot", went viral on Reddit and other social media sites because of its apparent resemblance to Hitler.

== Video games ==
- The first part of Wolfenstein 3D culminates in a battle with Hitler in a robotic suit.
- Wolfenstein II: The New Colossus features Adolf Hitler in the 1960s after Nazis win World War II. It is revealed B.J. Blazkowicz assassinated Hitler during the Second American Revolution.
- He appears in the game, Persona 2: Innocent Sin as one of the last bosses in the game.
- In the game Mewgenics a mech piloted by the Hitler's disembodied head appears as a boss.
- He is the protagonist in the video game series Sex with Hitler.

== Art ==
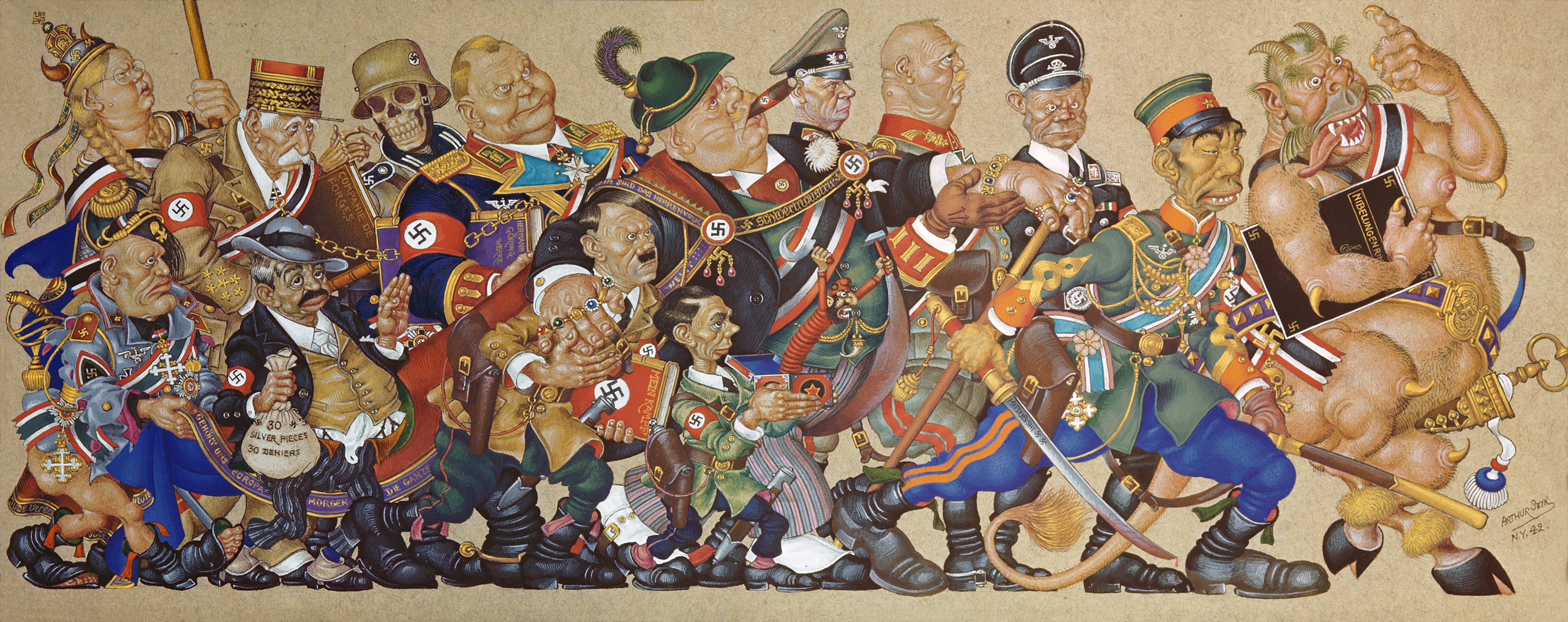
Satan Leads the Ball by Arthur Szyk

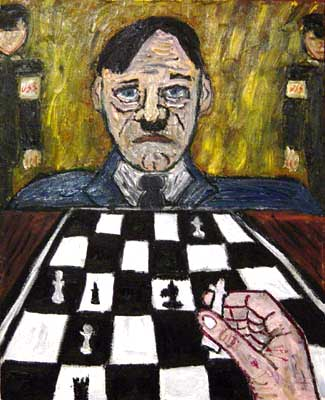
Being on the Dole by Wolf Howard

Salvador Dalí painted several pictures involving Hitler. The Enigma of Hitler (1939) depicts a torn photograph of Hitler on a plate in a typically surreal landscape over which hangs a broken telephone and an umbrella. He also painted the Metamorphosis of the Face of Hitler into a Moonlit Landscape (1958). One of his late works was Hitler Masturbating (1973), depicting just that, with Hitler seen from behind in an armchair in the center of a snow-filled desolate landscape.

Hitler is depicted in a balloon overlooking marching, helmeted troops in the painting Vision of War by Indian artist A. Ramachandran. A picture of him with Gandhi by M. F. Husain was controversial with Hindutva groups in India.

== In India ==
The name "Hitler" is widely used for anyone who is overly authoritarian in manner, but it does not have the same negative connotation as it does in the West. For example, in the 1998 film Hitler, the disciplinarian hero nicknamed Hitler is simply a person with staunch traditional values.

In Indian popular culture, Hitler is synonymous with rigidity; people often refer to their boss or a strict teacher as Hitler.

Hitler is also used as a personal name in India, as in the case of the politician Adolf Lu Hitler Marak. The film Hero Hitler in Love is about a man called "Hitler" who tries to love everyone. Furthermore, the swastika has for centuries been a common symbol in India with positive connotations. According to The Indian Republic,

A more recent cinematic outing- Gandhi to Hitler (2011) was decried for painting the man as a lost hero of India's struggle for Independence while Hitler memorabilia, including his autobiography Mein Kampf, continues to grow in sales. In 2006, a Mumbai restaurant was forced to change its name from the ill advised "Hitler's Cross" while in 2012, a clothing store named "Hitler" in Ahemdabad drew considerable anger (tellingly the owner of the unfortunately named store said that he had picked the name in memory of his grandfather, a strict disciplinarian whom the family referred to as "Hitler").

According to Navras Jaat Aafreedi, such references to Hitler are not usually linked to pro-Nazi sympathies, but some Hindu nationalist groups see Hitler's use of the swastika as a "great service to Hinduism" and link anti-Semitic ideology to anti-Islamism.

The "Hitler" clothing store in Ahmedabad in Gujarat opened in mid-August 2012. The store immediately became embroiled in controversy over its name. The store's logo even had a swastika embedded in the dot above the "i" in Hitler's name. The owner, Rajesh Shah, told media he did not expect all the commotion. He had chosen the name because the grandfather of his business partner was nicknamed "Hitler" because of his strict demeanor. He stated he did not intend to change the name unless somebody else paid the expenses. Among the groups that objected to the store's name was the small Jewish community in Ahmedabad. A diplomat at the Israeli embassy in New Delhi said that the embassy would protest in "the strongest terms possible" to the Indian government. The Israeli consul general in Mumbai asked state officials to ensure the store was renamed, but commented that she believes the use of the name most likely is a product of ignorance rather than antisemitism. Reports suggested that the shop owner had agreed to rename the store following an offer by a Jewish organization to pay the costs. In October 2012, the Ahmedabad Municipal authorities allegedly removed the store sign without proper procedure. It was later renamed Gladiator.

Cross Cafe in Mumbai was formerly Hitler's Cross cafe. The business sought to attract attention by using the Hitler theme, and was decorated with Nazi imagery. Actor Murli Sharma attended the opening party; when asked what he thought about the name, he said "I am not really agitated as I have not read much about the man. However, from what I know about Hitler, I find this name rather amusing." Alternative names suggested included Stalin Samosa Shop, Ayatollah Khomeini's Falafels, and Kim Jong's Juicy Juice.

== In Thailand ==
Hitler Fried Chicken was a fast-food restaurant in Thailand based on Yum! Brands Kentucky Fried Chicken restaurant chain. The mascot of Hitler Fried Chicken is Adolf Hitler wearing a Colonel Sanders outfit. As of 2012 Adolf Hitler is considered 'chic' by many in Thailand.

== See also ==
- Anti-American caricatures in Nazi Germany
- Anophthalmus hitleri, a species of blind cave beetle named for Adolf Hitler
