= The Iron Dream =

1972 novel by Norman Spinrad

- Cover of first edition (paperback)
- Author: "Adolf Hitler" (actually Norman Spinrad)
- Cover artist: Bob Habberfield
- Language: English
- Genre: Alternate history, science fantasy
- Publisher: Avon Books
- Publication date: September 1972
- Publication place: United States
- Media type: Print (paperback)
- Pages: 255
- ISBN: 0-380-00200-0 (first Avon printing)
- OCLC: 2527317

The Iron Dream is a metafictional 1972 alternate history novel by American author Norman Spinrad. The book has a nested narrative that tells a story within a story. On the surface, the novel presents a post-apocalyptic adventure tale entitled Lord of the Swastika, written by an alternate-history Adolf Hitler shortly before his death in 1953. In this timeline, Hitler emigrated from Germany to the United States in 1919 after the Great War, and used his modest artistic skills to become first a pulp science fiction illustrator and later a successful writer, telling lurid, purple-prosed, pro-fascism stories under a thin science fiction veneer. The nested narrative is followed by a faux-scholarly analysis by a fictional literary critic, Homer Whipple, which is said to have been written in 1959.

== Plot summary ==
The book's frame narrative and premise is that "after dabbling in radical politics," Adolf Hitler emigrated to the United States in 1919 and became a science fiction illustrator, editor, and author. He wrote his final science fantasy novel Lord of the Swastika in six weeks in 1953, shortly before dying of a cerebral hemorrhage perhaps caused by tertiary syphilis; Lord of the Swastika subsequently won the Hugo Award and the "colorful uniforms" described therein became staples of science fiction conventions. Hitler's other published works include the long-running fanzine Storm and novels such as The Master Race, The Thousand Year Rule, and The Triumph of the Will.

=== Novel within the novel: Lord of the Swastika ===
Lord of the Swastika could be considered a roman à clef, in that its plot roughly follows the rise of Nazism in our (out-of-universe) world. In-universe, it is not a roman à clef in so many aspects, because in-universe Hitler did not rise to power and the frame narrative gives no hint that people such as Röhm, Göring, and Hess ever existed. Obvious parallels are given in [brackets] below.

The novel opens 1142 years after the "Time of Fire," a global nuclear war that brought about the end of the civilization of the technologically advanced "Ancients" and the current despoliation of most forms of life. The gene pools of almost all life forms are corrupted by radiation. Few examples of the baseline human form can be seen; most of humanity are now "mutants" — Blueskins, Lizardmen, Parrotfaces — or "mongrels" or the normal-seeming but inhuman "Dominators," who desire to rule the ruined world with their mind-controlling powers.

The pure and strong young "Trueman" (so named for the lack of mutations in his DNA) Feric Jaggar returns from the outlands of Borgravia, where his family was exiled by the Treaty of Karmak [Versailles], to his ancestral land, the High Republic of Heldon, which was founded on the principles of racial purity. He arrives to find its rigor slackened and corrupted by the "Universalists," pawns of the sinister Dominator country of Zind, which seeks to corrupt Heldon's pure human gene pool into the mutant diversity that rules the rest of the world. Indeed, in the very first portion of Heldon that Feric enters, the customs fort where entrants are tested to see whether they are pure and free of mutation, he is outraged that mutants are being allowed into Heldon on day-passes and that the tests are so lax that impure specimens are being granted citizenship. The reason, he observes, is that the entire garrison is under the spell of a Dominator disguised as a simple clerk.

In Heldon proper, Feric dines in the "Eagle's Nest" tavern [Sterneckerbräu] and mulls over the question of how to change this situation. Should he enter politics or the military? Feric witnesses the oratory of Seph Bogel [perhaps a composite of Anton Drexler and Joseph Goebbels], leader of the Human Renaissance Party [German Workers' Party], who speaks eloquently but ineffectually to the crowd about the need for human purity. Fired by his words, Feric is inspired to take control of the listening crowd and lead a mob to kill the "Dom" at the customs fort. At Bogel's invitation, he assumes leadership of the Party. The two travel on to Walder—the second city of Heldon—to meet the Party's inner circle and begin the great task.

Their journey is interrupted when their steam-powered bus is waylaid by an outlaw motorcycle gang who call themselves the Black Avengers. Jaggar senses that these men may be of use to his cause and challenges their leader, Stag Stopa [Ernst Röhm]. The rules of the Black Avengers allow none but a member to challenge the leader, and so Feric demands to be initiated as a member. Jaggar and Bogel discover that the Avengers have possession of the "Great Truncheon of Stag Held" — a legendary weapon which can be wielded only by a pure-blooded descendent of the last true King of Heldon — although no Avenger can lift it. Feric acquits himself manfully in the first two initiation tests: the drinking of ale and the running of a gantlet of torches. The third and final test is a truncheon duel with Stopa, which Stopa informs him will be to the death. In the duel, Feric's truncheon breaks. Unthinkingly, he seizes up the Great Truncheon to block Stopa's blow. Stopa and the Avengers instantly pledge fealty to him, and become the "Knights of the Swastika" [Sturmabteilung].

From this event, Jaggar assumes a hereditary right to be the leader of Heldon and embarks on a violent crusade for genetic purity, drawing a massive following, staging outdoor rallies and continuing to expand the Knights (under Stopa) as his own personal army. A fat brigadier general named Lar Waffing [Göring] informs him that Heldon's existing military, the Star Command, is wary of the increasingly powerful Knights, so Jaggar creates a new paramilitary force of racially pure Truemen which he names the Swastika Squad [Schutzstaffel], under the command of Bors Remler [Himmler], and assigns both Stopa and Remler to report to Waffing. Jaggar also rechristens the Human Renaissance Party as the "Sons of the Swastika" and reforms the Party leadership to include himself as Supreme Commander, followed by Bogel, Waffing, Stopa, Remler, and a handsome young man named Ludolf Best [Rudolf Hess] with no particular portfolio.

Feric's "rallies," held in Universalist-infested parts of town, are deliberate provocations and invariably turn into violent battles; television coverage of these battles is the Party's best propaganda. Feric is elected to the Council of State in a landslide. At this point, Remler informs Jaggar that Stag Stopa has been conspiring against his person, so Jaggar and the SS attack the Knights' headquarters and slay Stopa, who has indeed been corrupted by Zind and is found carousing with mutant "pleasure sluts," along with all the high command of the Knights [Night of the Long Knives]. Feric immediately returns to the Council, presents evidence of this conspiracy, identifies the Council's sole Universalist member as a Dom, coerces the Council into granting him complete executive power [Enabling Act of 1933], and concludes by having them all shot.

Backed by the army, the adoring multitudes, and his five High Commanders, Feric sets about the great task of re-invigorating the military, ordering the production of tanks and fighter jets and the establishment of "Classification Camps," which re-examine all citizens of Heldon (exterminating the Doms, sterilizing or exiling all impure humans, and recruiting the finest specimens into the SS). After repelling a Zind attack through Wolack [Poland] and confining the Zind to the east side of the river Roul [Vistula], Heldon annexes its western and southern neighbors, beginning with Borgravia [the Anschluss]. Remler shows Feric that the Classification Camps of Borgravia, although much larger than those of Heldon, are still overflowing, and Feric agrees that the mutants of Borgravia are not to be sterilized or exiled, but rather euthanized.

Months later, his scientists report that they are near to rediscovering the secrets of the Ancients' nuclear weapons. Feric, horrified, orders such research ended; but, hearing that Zind is making its own researches and expeditions to recover relic weapons of the Ancients, determines to make haste to wipe out Zind and every last Dom before they can unleash the Fire. Soon enough, Zind begins to rally its troops from their reverse in Wolack. The final invasion of Zind is hard-fought: the main Helder force, under the command of Lar Waffing, takes the southwestern oil fields needed for resupply, while a secondary force under Feric himself, with Best at his right hand, takes on the vast bulk of the Zind army protecting the Zind capital to the north. Needless to say, the forces of Heldon prevail and the Zind army is destroyed, down to the last mindless "Warrior" slave. The central city is reduced to cinders in a firestorm; Feric, amazed by the pillar of fire, orders his men to form a gigantic rotating swastika centered on it, which he films from the air.

Feric, Bogel, Best, Waffing, and Remler enter the destroyed city, where in an underground bunker Feric discovers the last Dom in the world, an "ancient" with immense mental powers. The Dom triumphantly reveals that his kind have salvaged and rearmed one of the Ancients' weapons — which he triggers before Feric kills him. It is a doomsday weapon (perhaps similar to a cobalt bomb), and as the Dom planned, its fallout utterly corrupts every germ cell it touches. If any Helder, including Feric, reproduce, they will produce only horrible mutants.

In a final desperate gamble, Feric orders the sterilization of the entire Heldon nation, including himself, and orders his scientists to redouble their efforts to clone full-grown men from the uncorrupted somatic cells of the most perfect of the SS. They succeed, and millions of the new master race are produced in "reproduction works." At the novel's close, Heldon has mastered interstellar travel. A starship containing in suspended animation three hundred of these seven-foot, blond, super-intelligent all-male SS clones is launched toward Tau Ceti to initiate Heldon's own galactic empire. The SS clones also have a clone of Feric to lead them. This rocket will become the first of many.

=== Whipple's afterword ===
In a critical analysis appended to the narrative — fictively titled "Afterword to the Second Edition" — the (fictitious) Dr. Homer Whipple of New York University analyzes the "rather inexplicable" popularity of the book in the six years between its 1953 publication and the 1959 date of Whipple's analysis. Whipple reports that Lord of the Swastika is lauded for its qualities as a great work of heroic fantasy. (In the first Avon edition, actual science fiction writers contributed faux statements of praise as blurbs on the novel's back cover.)

Whipple identifies Hitler's book as the product of several orthogonal and likely unconscious psychological impulses. First, the "obsessional consistency and intensity of the phallic symbolism" — the protagonist's truncheon, the "outstretched-arm salute," the rocket — "in a sense, the entire novel is a piece of sublimated pornography." Second, the "unselfconscious fetishism" apparent in repeated descriptions of shiny leather, gleaming chrome, and coordinated marching. Third, the "anality" of Hitler's "morbid dread of body secretions and processes." Fourth, the psychotic violence of the battle scenes, presented as admirable and virtuous behavior. Whipple's conclusion is that "the power of Lord of the Swastika lies not in the skill of the writer but in the unbridled pathological fantasies which he has unselfconsciously committed to print."

While all of the above features of the novel could be (and, Whipple thinks, were in fact) unconscious on Hitler's part, Whipple points to the plot's clear political allegory as Hitler's own conscious creation. Whipple identifies Zind as "the logical extreme endpoint of Communist ideology," and Heldon as "either Germany or the non-Communist world." Yet Whipple is puzzled by the book's "entirely inexplicable genetic obsessions," the mongrels and mutants, and especially by the Dominators. "There is the temptation to conclude that the Dominators are somehow symbolic of the Jews. But," since Zind stands for the Soviet Union, "in which anti-Semitism has reached such rabid heights in the past decade that five million Jews have perished," whereas in Hitler's fantasy the Dominators are entirely in control of Zind, Whipple rejects such a simplistic allegory. He finally dismisses the Dominators subplot as an inexplicable "confusion in details."

Whipple informs the reader of some of the history of the world between Hitler's emigration to the United States in 1919 and the present (that is, 1959). Whipple refers to World War I as "the Great War," implying that there has been no equivalent of World War II in his world. Without Hitler's leadership, the Nazi Party fell apart in 1923 and Germany fell to a Communist coup in 1930. The "Greater Soviet Union" annexed all of Europe, including the United Kingdom in 1948; as of 1959 its influence is growing even in South America. While Lord of the Swastika takes place in a postapocalyptic world, Whipple gives no indication of nuclear weapons' actually existing. Whipple discloses that the Empire of Japan has retained its militarism, with reference to its bushido code of conduct, while the United States vacillates against the Greater Soviet Union's ascendancy. Due to the Soviet threat, the United States and Japan have a close military and strategic alliance, and are the only major powers still standing between the Greater Soviet Union and total control of the globe; yet most Americans seem unable to be roused to deal with the looming Soviet danger.

Whipple's commentary, while ostensibly aimed at Lord of the Swastika, often implicitly critiques the real fiction of Spinrad's own timeline (particularly Golden Age science fiction and fantasy). For example, Whipple remarks on the utter absence of women from Hitler's book: While "asexuality is a hallmark of the typical science-fantasy novel [... Hitler] goes to incredible lengths to deny the very need for the female half of the human race," in that Jaggar's final solution involves "the cloning of the all-male SS." On the book's phallic symbolism: "The hero with the magical sword is a common, indeed virtually universal, feature of so-called sword and sorcery novels." On its being the product of a pathological and degenerate mind: "Lord of the Swastika varies only in intensity and to some extent in content from the considerable body of pathological literature published within the science-fiction field."

In another irony, Whipple writes that Feric's rise to power was "ridiculous" in the extreme:

Indeed, in the book Hitler seems to assume that masses of men in fetishistic uniforms marching in precise displays and displaying phallic gestures and paraphernalia will have a powerful appeal to ordinary human beings. Feric Jaggar comes to power in Heldon through little more than a grotesque series of increasingly grandiose phallic displays. This is undoubtedly phallic fetishism on the part of the author, since the alternative conclusion is to accept the ridiculous notion that an entire nation would throw itself at the feet of a leader simply on the basis of mass displays of public fetishism, orgies of blatant phallic symbolism, and mass rallies enlivened with torchlight and rabid oratory. Obviously, such a mass national psychosis could never occur in the real world.

Whipple writes that many readers must be tempted to long for the advantages a leader like Feric Jaggar could bring to America's struggle against global Communism; but that "led by the likes of a Feric Jaggar, we might gain the world at the cost of our souls." "Of course," he adds, "such a man could gain power only in the extravagant fancies of a pathological science-fiction novel."

== History ==
Norman Spinrad was intent on demonstrating just how close Joseph Campbell's The Hero with a Thousand Faces and much science fiction and fantasy literature can be to the racist ideology of Nazi Germany. Spinrad has said that the original version of the novel was 70,000 words long, but that his editor requested he add an extra 10,000 words "to justify the advance and the cover price they wanted to put on it."

=== Reception ===
The Iron Dream won critical acclaim, including a Nebula Award nomination and a Prix Tour-Apollo Award. Ursula K. Le Guin wrote in a review that: "We are forced, insofar as we can continue to read the book seriously, to think, not about Adolf Hitler and his historic crimes—Hitler is simply the distancing medium—but to think about ourselves: our moral assumptions, our ideas of heroism, our desires to lead or to be led, our righteous wars. What Spinrad is trying to tell us is that it is happening here." Le Guin also stated that "a novel by Adolf Hitler" cannot "be well-written, complex, (or) interesting", as this "would spoil the bitter joke", but also asked why anyone should "read a book that isn't interesting", arguing that the bad prose of "Hitler's" book may have been due, in part, to the poor quality of Spinrad's own prose.

Leslie Fiedler proposed that Spinrad be considered for the National Book Award in 1973, but apparently won no support from his fellow award judges.

In 1982, the book was "indexed" in West Germany by the Bundesprüfstelle für jugendgefährdende Medien for its alleged promotion of Nazism. Spinrad's publisher, Heyne Verlag, challenged this in court and, until the ban was overturned in 1987, the book could be sold, but not advertised or publicly displayed.

The American Nazi Party put the book on its recommended reading list, despite the satirical intent of the work. In Spinrad's own words:

To make damn sure that even the historically naive and entirely unselfaware reader got the point, I appended a phony critical analysis of Lord of the Swastika, in which the psychopathology of Hitler's saga was spelled out by a tendentious pedant in words of one syllable. Almost everyone got the point... And yet one review appeared in a fanzine that really gave me pause. "This is a rousing adventure story and I really enjoyed it," the gist of it went. "Why did Spinrad have to spoil the fun with all this muck about Hitler?"

== See also ==
- Hypothetical Axis victory in World War II—includes an extensive list of other articles regarding works of Nazi Germany/Axis/World War II alternate history.
- A Man Lies Dreaming — 2014 novel by Lavie Tidhar, in which Hitler, having fled Germany after losing the 1933 election to the Communists, finds work as a private detective in late-thirties London.
- Adolf Hitler in popular culture
- List of nuclear holocaust fiction
- Quark, Strangeness and Charm, Hawkwind album with instrumental song "Iron Dream"

== Sources ==
- Spinrad, Norman. "On Books: The Emperor of Everything". Isaac Asimov's Science Fiction Magazine, January 1988, pp. 173–186.
