= Barricade (disambiguation) =

A barricade is an object used to control, block passage, or force the flow of traffic in the desired direction.

Barricade or barricades may also refer to:

== Arts and entertainment ==
=== Films ===
- The Barricade, a 1921 American silent film directed by Christy Cabanne
- Barricade (1939 film), an action film directed by Gregory Ratoff and starring Alice Faye
- Barricade (1950 film), a western film starring Dane Clark, Raymond Massey, and Ruth Roman
- Barricade (2007 film), a horror film directed by Timo Rose
- Barricade (2012 film), a thriller film directed by Andrew Currie
- Barricades (film), a 1972 documentary film by Ram Loevy

=== Music ===
- "Barricade", a 2010 song by Interpol from their self-titled fourth album
- "Barricades", a 2018 song by the Cat Empire from their album Stolen Diamonds

=== Fictional characters ===
- Barricade (C.O.P.S.), a fictional character in the COPS universe
- Barricade (Transformers), several fictional robot super villain characters in the Transformers robot superhero franchise.
- Barricade (G.I. Joe), a fictional character in the G.I. Joe universe

=== Other ===
- Barricade (play), a 1975 Indian Bengali-language drama written and directed by Utpal Dutt
- Barricade (video game), an overhead view maze arcade game released by RamTeK in 1976
- Barricade, a board game also known as Malefiz, popular in German speaking countries

== In the military ==
- Operation Barricade, a British commando raid during the Second World War
- USS Barricade (ACM-3), a Chimo-class minelayer in the United States Navy during World War II
- HMAS Barricade (P 98), an Attack class patrol boat of the Royal Australian Navy

== Other uses ==
- The Barricades, events that took place between 13 and 27 January 1991 in Latvia
- "Barrycades", a derogatory term for the United States federal government shutdown of 2013
- An emergency system of arresting gear for aircraft.
- Barricade gel, a fire-retardant gel that is mostly made of hydrogel
