= List of songs recorded by Lead Belly =

The following is a partial list of songs performed by Lead Belly. Lead Belly, born Huddie Ledbetter, was an American folk and blues musician active in the 1930s and 1940s.

- "4, 5 & 9"
- "Abraham Lincoln"
- "Ain't Goin Down the Well No More"
- "Ain't Gonna Drink No More"
- "Ain't Gonna Study War No More
- "Ain't It a Shame to Go Fishin' on a Sunday"
- "Alabama Bound"
- "Alberta"
- "Amazing Grace"
- "Army Life" (see "I Don't Want No More of Army Life")
- "Backslider, Fare Thee Well"
- "Baby don't you Love me No More"
- "Backwater Blues"
- "Becky Dean"
- "Big Fat Woman"
- "Birmingham Jail"
- "Black Betty"
- "Black Girl" (trad.) (see "In the Pines")
- "Black Snake Moan"
- "Blind Lemon Blues"
- "the Blood Done Signed my Names (ain't you Glad)"
- "Blue Tail Fly"
- "Blues Around New York"
- "The Boll Weevil"
- "Bottle Up and Go" (a.k.a. "Borrow Love and Go")
- "The Bourgeois Blues"
- "Bring a Little Water, Silvy" (with Martha Ledbetter)
- "Bull Cow"
- "Careless Love"
- "C.C. Rider"
- "Corn Bread Rough"
- "Cotton Fields"
- "Death Letter Blues" (parts 1&2)
- "Daddy, I'm Coming Back to You" (tribute to Jimmie Rodgers)
- "Dance Calls"
- "Dekalb Blues"
- "Diggin' my Potatoes"
- "Don't Lie Buddy" (with Josh White)
- "Don't you Love your Daddy No More?" (trad.)
- "Down in the Valley to Pray"
- "Duncan and Brady"
- "Easy Rider"
- "Ella Speed"
- "Every Time I Feel the Spirit"
- "Fannin Street (Mister Tom Hughes' Town)"
- "Fiddlers Dram"
- "Fort Worth and Dallas Blues"
- "Four Day Worry Blues"
- "Frankie and Albert" (trad.)
- "The Gallows Pole"
- "Get Up in the Mornin'"
- "Git on Board"
- "Go Down Old Hannah"
- "Good Good Good"
- "Good Morning Blues"
- "Goodnight Irene"
- "Governor O.K. Allen"
- "Governor Pat Neff"
- "Green Corn"
- "Grey Goose"
- "Gwine Dig a Hole to Put Devil In"
- "The Hindenburg Disaster" (parts 1 & 2)
- "Ha Ha This A-Way"
- "Ham an' Eggs"
- "He Never Said a Mumblin' Word" (trad.)
- "Heaeh Mountain Stomp"
- "Hitler Song"
- "House of The Rising Sun"
- "How Long, How Long Blues" (with Sonny Terry)
- "Howard Hughes"
- "If It Wasn't for Dicky"
- "I Don't Want No More of Army Life"
- "If You Want To Do Your Part"
- "I'll be down on the last Bread Wagon"
- "I'm Alone Because I Love You"
- "I'm on My Last Go Round"
- "I'm Sorry, Mama"
- "In the Pines" (trad.)
- "In dem Hot Summer Days"
- "It's Tight Like That"
- "In New Orleans (House of the Rising Sun)" (trad.)
- "Jean Harlow"
- "Jim Crow Blues"
- "John Hardy"
- "John Henry"
- "Join the Band"
- "Julie Ann Johnson"
- "Kansas City Papa"
- "Keep your Hands Off Her"
- "Laura"
- "Leaving Blues (When you are smiling)"
- "Let It Shine on Me" (trad.)
- "Line Em"
- "Lining Track" (trad.)
- "Little Children's Blues"
- "Little Sally Walker"
- "Looky Looky Yonder"
- "Match Box Blues"
- "Medicine Man"
- "Meeting at the Building"
- "Midnight Special" (trad.)
- "Mister Tom Hughes's Town"
- "Moanin'"
- "Mother's Blues"
- "Mr. Hitler"
- "Must I Be Carried into the Sky"
- “My Baby Quit Me”
- "National Defense Blues"
- "New York City"
- "New Black Snake Moan"
- "Nobody Knows the Trouble I've Seen"
- "Noted (No Good) Rider"
- "Oh, Something on My Mind"
- "Old Man"
- "Old Rattler"
- "(Old) Stewball"
- "Old Time Religion"
- "On a Christmas Day"
- "On a Monday"
- "Out On the Western Plains" (a.k.a. "Cow Cow Yicky Yicky Yea")
- "Outshine the Sun"
- "Outskirts of Town"
- "Ox Drivin’ Blues"
- "Packing Trunk Blues"
- "Pig Meat" (with Sonny Terry - Harmonica)
- "Pig Meat Papa"
- "Pick a Bale of Cotton" (trad.)
- "Poor Howard"
- "Prayer"
- "Pretty Flowers in My Backyard" (a.k.a. "Pretty Flower in Your Backyard")
- "The Red Cross Store Blues"
- "Red River"
- "Relax Your Mind"
- "Ride On"
- "Roberta" (parts 1 & 2)
- "Rock Island Line"
- "the Roosevelt Song"
- "Run Sinners"
- "Sail On, Little Girl, Sail On"
- "Salty Dog"
- "the Scottsboro Boys"
- "Shorty George"
- "Silver City Bound"
- "Skip to My Lou"
- "Stand Your Test in Judgement"
- "Stewball"
- "Sweet Mary Blues (Governor Pat Neff)"
- "Swing Low, Sweet Chariot" (trad.)
- "Sylvie"
- "Take a Whiff on Me"
- "Take This Hammer"
- "TB Blues"
- "Tell me Baby"
- "They Hung Him on a Cross" (see "He Never Said a Mumblin' Word")
- "The Titanic"
- "There's a Man Goin' around Takin' Names"
- "Turn your Radio On"
- "We Shall Be Free" (with Woody Guthrie)"
- "We Shall Walk Thru the Valley"
- "Western Plain"
- "When I Was a Cowboy"
- "When the Boys Were Out on the Western Plains"
- "When the Train Comes Along"
- "Where Did You Sleep Last Night" (trad.) (see "In the Pines")
- "Whoa Back Buck"
- "Yellow Gal"
- "Yellow Women's Doorbells" (see "On a Monday")
- "You Can't Lose-A Me Cholly"
- "You Don't Miss Your Water"
- "You Don't Know My Mind"
- "You Must Have that Religion, Halleloo"
