= Hitler Masturbating =

1973 painting by Salvador Dalí

- Hitler masturbándose (Spanish)
- Artist: Salvador Dalí
- Year: 1973
- Catalogue: 2007.118
- Medium: Gouache on paper
- Dimensions: 16.5 cm × 21.6 cm (6.5 in × 8.5 in)
- Location: Salvador Dalí Museum; St. Petersburg, Florida

Hitler Masturbating is a gouache-on-paper painting by Spanish Surrealist artist Salvador Dalí, which, in turn, is an alteration of a work by an unknown artist. Completed in 1973, it is 16.5 cm × 21.6 cm in size and is housed at the Salvador Dalí Museum in St. Petersburg, Florida, United States. As of 2022, the painting is not available for public viewing.

Several interpretations have been proposed in regard to the meaning of the artwork, such as it being an allegory of Adolf Hitler's ideology and the destruction that followed, or it being an effort to humanize the former dictator.

== Description ==
Hitler Masturbating is an alteration of a painting which portrayed a herd of horses traversing a snowy landscape. According to the Salvador Dalí Museum, its author may have been August Friedrich Schenck, as it follows common themes in his artwork, and Dalí had also altered one of his works with his painting The Sheep. Dalí added and subtracted details with gouache; the finished product depicts German Führer Adolf Hitler seated on a chair upheld by horses on each corner while he fondles his penis. He does so alone, faced away from the viewer as though they are catching him in the act.

In 2012, Hitler Masturbating was brought newfound attention after it was displayed in an exhibition at the Centre Pompidou in Paris. It was also featured in the French edition of Dalí's novel Hidden Faces.

== Analysis ==
Dalí had a lifelong, and often controversial, fascination with authoritarian figures and ideologies. Eva Schooler, writing for Haaretz, described Hitler Masturbating as an attempt at humanizing Hitler, which "contradict[s] Dalí's assertion that his art was always apolitical". Schooler also notes a 1934 letter Dalí wrote to André Breton in which he stated that he had sexual fantasies involving the dictator and that Hitler "warranted the admiration of the Surrealists". Despite the letter, there remains debate among experts on whether Dalí had a genuine admiration of Nazism or if it was largely a sexual fixation. In 1939, Dalí was expelled from the Surrealist movement due to his controversial comments.

Josep Playà i Maset opined in La Vanguardia that "the painting is more likely to be a dirty joke on [Dalí's] part. As Hitler masturbates, he contemplates a barren wasteland, a void that resembles the destruction of Europe by his own hand".

In Why Are Our Pictures Puzzles?, art historian James Elkins suggests that Hitler Masturbating is suggestive of the belief among art historians that artworks often contain hidden sexual imagery or symbolism. Dalí, Elkins contends, is psychoanalyzing Hitler in an equivalent manner.

== Provenance ==
Along with his similarly transformed paintings The Sheep (1942) and The Ship (c. 1934–35), Dalí gave Hitler Masturbating to Reynolds and Eleanor Morse and explained its subject matter simply as "Hitler masturbating because he is lose le var! [sic]". The Morses later sent the painting to the Salvador Dalí Museum.

== See also ==
- The Enigma of Hitler
- The Great Masturbator
- Adolf Hitler in popular culture
- List of works by Salvador Dalí
