= The Enigma of Hitler =

1939 painting by Salvador Dalí

The Enigma of Hitler is an oil on canvas painting by Salvador Dalí, created in 1939. It was made around the time of his expulsion from the Surrealist movement. The painting is held in the collection of the Museo Nacional Centro de Arte Reina Sofía, in Madrid.

Dalí related that the painting was an interpretation of several dreams he had about Adolf Hitler – one had shown Neville Chamberlain's umbrella turning into a bat – a symbol from his childhood that filled him with fear. The cut telephone cord depicted in the painting has been interpreted as the communication disconnect between Chamberlain and Hitler.

The painting was first exhibited in 1939 at the Julien Levy Gallery in New York City, where, priced at $1750 US dollars, it did not sell. It was then reproduced in Life magazine's April 17, 1939 issue.

== See also ==
- Hitler Masturbating
- List of works by Salvador Dalí
