= Mr. Hitler =

American folk song

Song by Lead Belly

from the album Let It Shine on Me
- Released: 1942
- Genre: Blues
- Length: 4:35
- Label: Melodisc
- Songwriter(s): Lead Belly

"Mr. Hitler" or "Hitler Song"' is a blues song written by Huddie 'Lead Belly' Ledbetter about German chancellor Adolf Hitler released in 1942.

Lead Belly was part of a group of left-leaning musicians and had some sympathies for the Communist Party, explaining why he did not sing about Hitler during the Molotov–Ribbentrop Pact. He had previously performed topical songs, but he became outspoken about the rise of fascism during World War II. Lead Belly frequently performed "Mr. Hitler" before standing-room-only audiences. His listeners particularly appreciated the line about "tearing Mr. Hitler down someday."

With lyrics such as "Hitler started out in nineteen hundred and thirty two/When he started out, he took the homes from the Jews", Lead Belly encapsulated the threat of the Nazi regime with plenty of anger. Lead Belly believed that Hitler incited the Japanese to start their march of aggression. It has been suggested that the song was inspired by Lead Belly's brief association with Woody Guthrie.

In 2015, "Mr. Hitler" was included on the five-CD set, "Lead Belly: The Smithsonian Folkways Collection.”

== See also ==
- List of songs recorded by Lead Belly
- Adolf Hitler in popular culture
