= Gee, Mom, I Want to Go Home =

"Army Life"

Song by Lead Belly
- Released: 1944
- Genre: Novelty song
- Length: 1:48
- Songwriters: Traditional, Gitz Rice credited

"Gee, Mom, I Want to Go Home" (also known as "I Don't Want No More of Army Life") is a traditional, humorous song satirizing life in the Armed Forces. Each verse has two lines relating what recruits are told, followed by an exaggerated description of the fact.

For example:

The biscuits in the Army
They say are mighty fine,
One rolled off the table
And killed a pal of mine.

The original song was sung by Canadian soldiers during World War II. With original chorus

"Oh, I don't want no more of army life
Gee ma, I wanna go
back to Ontario
Gee ma, I wanna go ho_o_ome!"

The song occurs in several variations, the lyrics being adapted for the different branches of the Armed Forces, and it has been transformed into a camp song as well.

== Appearances in popular culture ==
- The song appeared in the 1943 play Winged Victory by Moss Hart.
- The song, presumably sung by British Commonwealth soldiers, can be heard during "The Desert: North Africa", the eighth episode of the documentary series The World at War.
- Folk singer Lead Belly performed the song (as "Gee, But I Want to Go Home" or "Army Life") on several 1940s recordings.
- The song was released as a single, titled "I Don't Want No More of Army Life", in 1950 by Texas Jim Robertson
- The song was performed in the 1977 M*A*S*H episode "Movie Tonight" (season 5, episode 22), with lyrics adapted to the characters and situations in the show. Father Mulcahy, Hawkeye and B.J., Colonel Potter, Klinger, Hot Lips, Radar and four of the nurses all sing a verse each. Frank Burns tries to sing a rather hostile verse after everyone has finished the song, but is glared down.
- Manny Singer (Ray Liotta) sings a verse to his despondent daughter shortly after the death of her mother at the beginning of the 1994 film Corrina, Corrina.
- A variant of the song is sung in the 2020 film Monster Hunter.
