= Barricade (play) =

1975 play by Utpal Dutt

- Written by: Utpal Dutt
- Characters: An engineer, an author, an artist and a journalist
- Original language: Bengali
- Setting: 1933–1937

Premiere

Barricade (1975) is Bengali drama written and directed by Utpal Dutt. The drama is set into a revolution time or war time when people's army are fighting against the state army.

== Plot ==
Between 1933 and 1937 Germany saw the rise of Adolf Hitler. This drama is set into that time when Hitler is rising to power. The whole drama is a conversation between different intellectuals and bourgeoisies of the society like an engineer, an author, an artist and a journalist. While the battle is going on in the town, these people just can not stay neutral and have to join any one side.

== See also ==
- Adolf Hitler in popular culture
