= Anti-American caricatures in Nazi Germany =

Harald Damsleth was a cartoonist for Nasjonal Samling, a Norwegian far-right political party sympathetic to the aims of its Nazi occupiers.

The Nazi Party and its ideological allies used cartoons and caricatures as a main pillar in their propaganda campaigns. Such techniques were an effective way to spread their ideology throughout Nazi Germany and beyond. The use of caricatures was a popular method within the party when pursuing their campaign against the United States, in particular its then-President Franklin D. Roosevelt.

== Nazi cartoons and caricatures ==
Cartoons and caricatures were an important part of Nazi propaganda. Der Stürmer provided a great platform for the party to publish their cartoons. Philipp Rupprecht was the newspaper's lead cartoonist, drawing over one thousand antisemitic cartoons during his career. Although his style is reported to have changed throughout his years of work, his caricatures always depicted Jews as the Nazi stereotype: short, fat, ugly, unshaven, drooling, sexually perverted, bent-nosed and with pig-like eyes. This shows how caricatures worked to the advantage of the Nazi party, allowing them to portray what they wanted in a way which photographs could not. A photograph would show a Jew as a human, whereas caricatures meant the Nazi party could portray Jews as inhumane in cartoon form. The cartoons intended to spread the create widespread support for Nazi ideology, in this case, anti-Americanism.

== Origins of propaganda between Germany and the USA ==
There were several events subsequent to Adolf Hitler coming into power which created the relationship which led to the hostile propaganda between Germany and America.

=== The Nazi Boycott of Jewish businesses in April 1933 ===
When word of the Nazi boycott of Jewish businesses reached America, the American Jewish Committee and American Jewish Congress called an emergency meeting. Here it was decided America would protest the boycott. On March 27, protest rallies occurred in New York; Chicago; Boston; Philadelphia; Baltimore; Cleveland and 70 other locations. The Nazi party denounced this as ‘slander' generated by Jews of German origin and announced a campaign of sharp countermeasures against the attacks.

=== 1936 Summer Olympics ===
As the 1936 Summer Olympics were held in Berlin, Germany there was great controversy over whether or not America should participate. Although it was decided by the US Olympic Committee that America was to participate, this decision was deplored by several American diplomats including William E. Dodd, the American ambassador to Berlin, and George Messersmith, head of the US legation in Vienna.

=== German American Bund ===
German American Bund was an organization of ethnic Germans living in the United States, with a pro-Nazi stance. The organization showed strong admiration for Adolf Hitler and the Nazi Party. They carried out active propaganda for their cause, publishing magazines and brochures, along with the organization of demonstrations and camps such as the Hitler Youth camps. Members of the group attended the 1936 Summer Olympics in Berlin where leader Fritz Julius Kuhn was photographed with Hitler. The group attempted to 'awaken German Americans to Nazism'. They tried non-violent methods such as the infiltration of existing German ethnic clubs and the sponsorship of meetings and rallies. However, violence was inevitable when the Bund tried to take control through intimidating methods. In 1935 when the Wisconsin Federation of German-American societies voted to ban displays of the swastika at cultural events, members of the Bund threatened anti-Nazi delegates; one of many examples of their attempts to counteract 'Anti-German' movement.

== Nazi propaganda themes surrounding Anti-Americanism ==
Themes in Nazi propaganda aimed at America revolved largely around the idea that the United States faced a 'lack of unity.' America was portrayed by the Nazi Party as a regressed nation, one unable to appreciate European culture. Hitler declared America as a "mongrel nation", grown too rich too soon and governed by a capitalist elite with strong ties to the Jews and the Americans were a "mongrel people" incapable of higher culture or great creative achievements. When giving a speech in reaction to America's negative comments on the Anti Jewish campaigns in 1938, Joseph Goebbels mocked the country, commenting on the way they borrowed from other countries, their unemployment rates, lynchings in the country and the economic and political scandals the country had seen. He used these examples to ridicule America as a country and insinuated that America had no right to criticize any other country considering the state that their own was in. In the speech, Goebbels said that 'it is not surprising that the New York [City] press attacks Germany so strongly. Over two million Jews live in New York and public, especially economic life, there is entirely under their control.' Goebbels went on to state, in a sarcastic nature: 'Such a nation is certainly justified in sneering at ancient Europe, whose nations and peoples looked back on centuries, even millennia, of cultural achievements long before America was even discovered.' This is an example of the theme discussed earlier about the Nazi party viewing America as a nation whose people did not have the ability to appreciate European culture. The Nazi propagandists blamed President Roosevelt for many of America's problems. They thought America was based on political and economic scandal. It was believed that America was too racially diverse and this was what allowed it to be controlled by Jews and Communists. Nazi propagandists also sometimes depicted President Roosevelt as a gangster, and later in their Anti-American campaign suggested in one cartoon that he deserved to be executed.

== Roosevelt and Jewish links ==
During the early years of Hitler being in office, he saw Jews as 'an element alien to the German nation' and he saw them as the main cause for all of Germany's problems. Nazi caricatures often portrayed America to be under Jewish control as a result of Roosevelt's ruling. In several caricatures Roosevelt is depicted as a Jew, or to have Jewish ancestry. This is done through the use of classic anti-Semitic stereotypes such as a hooked nose, hunched back and the use of the Star of David. Caricatures of this nature tended to appear on the covers of Nazi magazines and newspapers, such as Kladderadatsch. One image appeared on this magazine with the caption 'President Roosevelt', showing him looking at his reflection in a mirror but seeing himself as a Jew. This supported the common Nazi propagandist theme that Roosevelt was under Jewish control. This was a popular topic for propaganda in the Nazi party and appeared in several other cartoons and caricatures on magazine covers. The theme can be seen in another cartoon on the cover of 'Lustige Blätter' which is captioned 'American candelabra'. This again shows how the Nazi propagandists showed Roosevelt to be supportive of Jews.

== Roosevelt and Britain ==
Another popular theme in Nazi propaganda against the United States was that of President Roosevelt exploiting Britain. One cartoon entitled 'This lion needs a haircut' shows Roosevelt cutting the hair of the British Lion. The pieces of hair he cuts off represent parts of the Empire such as Jamaica and Trinidad. This is used to show how America received British bases in return for the supplies they were giving to Britain during the war. Another cartoon which depicts this theme is captioned "Take the bones to the kitchen. They'll make a good soup!" In this, Roosevelt has eaten the British lion, and is out to get everything he can out of the British Empire, showing how the Germans used America's alliance with Britain as propaganda against President Roosevelt. Both of these cartoons appeared in Lustige Blätter, a weekly German humor magazine. The magazine did not carry caricatures, even friendly ones, of Hitler or other Nazi leaders. There were many caricatures of Winston Churchill, Franklin Roosevelt, and Joseph Stalin.

== Roosevelt and the Second World War ==
The Nazi Party portrayed Roosevelt as seeing war as something which he could profit from. They used this as another anti American propaganda method. One cartoon on the cover of Kladderadatsch entitled "Roosevelt prays for peace" links this idea with the way the Nazi propagandists showed Roosevelt to be under the influence of the Jews. In this cartoon, Roosevelt is saying 'Grant, oh Jehovah, that war does not break out until we can sell weapons again!'. At the time of this cartoon, the Neutrality Acts of 1930s were in place and this prevented the U.S from selling military equipment to Europe. The Nazi party played on this suggesting that President Roosevelt did want war but only if he could profit from it. Another cartoon captioned 'They have their war! Warmonger #1 and his lure Eleanor'. The cartoon says 'Now the hobbling cripple and his ugly wife have what they wanted.' The first lady, Eleanor Roosevelt is often criticized in Nazi caricatures and cartoon propaganda. The fact that the Nazi propagandists portray Roosevelt as wanting to go to war is also helpful to their propaganda campaign at home. The main task of Nazi propaganda, both at home and abroad was to reassure the general public, alarmed at the possibility that Hitler meant war. Roosevelt is the perfect opportunity to deflect the want for war onto a different source and therefore reassure the German people that Hitler was not the reason for war.

== Roosevelt as a gangster ==
Roosevelt was often depicted in Nazi propaganda caricatures as a gangster. One cartoon entitled 'Al Capone's best pupil' shows Roosevelt thanking Capone for his assistance and to let him know if there is anything he can do for him. Here, the Nazi's play on the theme that America was politically corrupt. This cartoon appeared in Lustige Blätter, a weekly magazine, discussed earlier in this article. Another cartoon shows Roosevelt in an electric chair and states that 'the gangster president' is in the president chair where he belongs. This image was featured on the cover of Kladderadatsch.

== Other Nazi propaganda caricatures ==
There are several other themes which do not necessarily fit into a particular category that were used by Nazi propagandists against America and Roosevelt. One shows a loud, steam-blowing train named "Roosevelt" and reads 'Well, Stalin, if noise were power the machine wouldn't be bad!' This was used to represent the regular Nazi theme that Americans were all talk and were big mouths that did not follow through on what they said. Another cartoon shows Roosevelt's failure in his New Deal. He is using his crutches to collect new military bases in Iceland and the Azores. This shows how Roosevelt is trying to find new ways to support himself after his previous plan had failed. Both of these images appeared on the cover of German weekly magazine Fliegende Blätter.

== See also ==
- Propaganda in Nazi Germany
- Anti-Americanism
