= Supreme War Command =

Central Powers military headquarters

- Oberste Kriegsleitung
- Active: 1916–1918
- Countries: German Empire; Austria-Hungary; Ottoman Empire; Bulgaria
- Allegiance: Central Powers
- Type: Combined Headquarters
- Nickname(s): OKL
- Engagements: World War I

Commanders
- Nominal commander: Wilhelm II
- Effective commander: Paul von Hindenburg

The Supreme War Command (German: Oberste Kriegsleitung, OKL; initially the Joint Supreme War Command (Gemeinsame Oberste Kriegsleitung)) was a military headquarters established on 7 September 1916, to exert command over all of the armed forces of the Central Powers in the First World War. The creation of the command had been discussed by German political figures by mid-1916 but was implemented at the request of Paul von Hindenburg and Erich Ludendorff, who were appointed to effective command of the Imperial German Army on 29 August. Germany's key ally Austria-Hungary was ambivalent on the matter but eventually agreed to the proposal on 3 September. The other two Central Powers, Bulgaria and the Ottoman Empire, formally agreed at a conference on 6 September and the OKL was established the following day.

Though nominally commanded by the German Emperor, Wilhelm II, Hindenburg held effective command. This granted him control over 6 million men in the armies of the Central Powers. The national commanders were also required to submit regular reports to the OKL. The creation of the OKL was seen as a significant loss of prestige for Austria-Hungary, which was further humiliated in 1917 when, following the Sixtus Affair, Emperor Charles I was forced to apologise to German leaders and the word 'joint' (Gemeinsame) was removed from the title of the OKL.

== Background ==
The Central Powers of the First World War from 1914 were Germany, Austria-Hungary and the Ottoman Empire; joined in 1915 by Bulgaria. On 29 August 1916, with the war at a stalemate on many fronts, the German Emperor Wilhelm II appointed Paul von Hindenburg as chief of the German General Staff and Erich Ludendorff as his deputy (as First Quartermaster General). Hindenburg and Ludendorff realised that the war could not be won on the Eastern Front with Russia but must be won on the Western Front with the defeat of Britain and France, with troops transferred from the east. They also wished to quickly defeat Romania, which had joined the Allies in August 1916. To achieve this, they decided that better military cooperation between the Central Powers would be required and suggested that the establishment of a Supreme War Command (Oberste Kriegsleitung, OKL), previously discussed at high political levels in Germany, be sped up. This headquarters would exercise ultimate command over all Central Powers military forces.

The Austro-Hungarian political and military leadership were split on the matter. Some, such as Hungarian Minister of war Samu Hazai and Hungarian Prime Minister István Tisza were in favour of a unified command, but others were opposed. The Austro-Hungarian Adjutant-General Johann Herbert von Herberstein drafted an agreement for the establishment of the OKL that summer, under the supervision of the Germans. The Austrian Chief of the General Staff Franz Conrad von Hötzendorf opposed the unified command and had hoped that the dismissal of Hindenburg's predecessor Erich von Falkenhayn had taken the option off the table.

On 2 September, Austrian general Arthur Freiherr von Bolfras telegrammed the German military command to indicate that Austrian Emperor Charles I had agreed to a unified command. It was suggested that the command be in the form of a war council but Ludendorff favoured a more decisive body with the German Emperor holding absolute power to make the final decision. Conrad discussed the proposal with Charles for around 90 minutes on 3 September, after which the Austrian Emperor agreed to the German proposal on the basis that the German army was stronger than his. Conrad proposed that the Austrian foreign ministry be involved in the command structure, but was overruled.

== Establishment ==
A conference was arranged with the other members of the Central Powers, to be held on 6 September. This was attended by Wilhelm II, the Ottoman war minister Enver Pasha and the Bulgarian Tsar Ferdinand I. Enver Pasha formally proposed the creation of the Supreme War Command, with the German Emperor at its head and the German General Staff acting as an advisory body. The command was formally established the next day, as the Joint Supreme War Command (Gemeinsame Oberste Kriegsleitung).

The formal agreement for creating the body stated that "the Supreme War Command extends to the fundamental objectives of the operations carried out in the different theatres of war, the forces used for these ... [and the] chain of command and subordination. For exercising the Supreme War Command, the army supreme commanders of the allied armed forces and their general staff chiefs are at the disposal of the German Kaiser". The decisions of the OKL were binding on the commanders of the armies of the Central Powers, who were also required to submit regular reports to the German Emperor. The agreement also stated that the OKL was the only body permitted to conduct peace negotiations with the Allies, thus forbidding any separate peace negotiations by individual nations. Germany made a separate, secret agreement with Austria-Hungary that the OKL would respect the territorial integrity of the Austro-Hungarian Empire in any peace negotiations on a basis "equal to those of the German Empire".

The OKL's remit was narrowly defined to the military field, having no control over civilian matters, which remained under the control of the national governments. In practice, Wilhelm allowed Hindenburg to exercise command of the OKL on his behalf in almost all matters, though remaining subordinate to him. This gave the German general command of 6 million men across a variety of theatres of war. Hindenburg's first directive issued through the OKL was for the army commanders to hold their positions on the Western, Eastern, Italian, and Macedonian fronts to preserve troops for the attack on Romania. His subsequent attack defeated Romania, which requested an armistice in December 1917. The Central Powers were unable to agree on terms, and Germany permitted separate armistice negotiations to be held with the Romanians by each nation. The formal peace treaty, the Treaty of Bucharest, was negotiated between February and March 1918 and signed by all of the Central Powers.

== Later events ==
The creation of the OKL represented a significant loss of prestige for the Austro-Hungarian Empire. In 1917, the Austro-Hungarians attempted to negotiate a separate peace with the Allies. This came to public knowledge in the Sixtus Affair, leading to embarrassment for Charles I. He was required to apologise to the German leaders in Spa, Belgium, and to agree to the dropping of the word joint (Gemeinsame) from the title of the OKL. It took 18 months for the Allies to adopt a similar system under a Supreme Allied Commander, the French General Ferdinand Foch.
