= Stanley Eveling =

English philosopher and writer

Stanley Eveling, or Harry Stanley Eveling (4 August 1925 in Newcastle upon Tyne – 24 December 2008 in Edinburgh) was an English playwright and academic, based in Scotland.

== Early life and career ==
Eveling was educated at Rutherford College and Samuel King's School. After serving as an officer with the Durham Light Infantry in the Far East at the end of the Second World War, he attended King's College, Durham University, where he was editor of King's Courier, the student newspaper. He then completed a postgraduate degree in philosophy at Oxford University. Eveling taught at the University of Aberdeen and the University College of Wales, Aberystwyth, before becoming a senior lecturer and a teaching fellow in philosophy at the University of Edinburgh, and later professor of moral philosophy. He was also the television critic for The Scotsman.

== Plays ==
- Come and Be Killed
- Buglar Boy and His Swish Friend
- The Strange Case of Martin Richter
- The Dead of Night
- OneFourSeven
- The Lunatic, the Secret Sportsman and the Woman Next Door
- Vibrations

Performed in Edinburgh at the Traverse Theatre since the 1960s, they have also been produced worldwide.

== Death ==
He died of cancer on 24 December 2008.
