= Cain, or Hitler in Hell =

1944 painting by George Grosz

- Artist: George Grosz
- Year: 1944
- Medium: oil on canvas
- Dimensions: 99 cm × 124.5 cm (39 in × 49.0 in)
- Location: Deutsches Historisches Museum, Berlin

Cain, or Hitler in Hell is an oil-on-canvas painting by German-American artist George Grosz, painted in 1944. It is one of the most known paintings of the years when Grosz lived in the United States, from 1933 to 1959, after leaving Germany, shortly before the Nazis seized power. It was part of Grosz's heirs collection until being purchased in 2019 by the Deutsches Historisches Museum, in Berlin, where it has been exhibited since 2020.

== Description ==
The painting was created when World War II was in its final stages, with the defeat of Nazi Germany predictable. Hitler in this painting takes the place of Cain, the first murderer, who killed his brother Abel, in the Book of Genesis. He is seen in an apocalyptic landscape, seated at the left, mopping his forehead with a kerchief, while a corpse lies in the mud, face down and bare-chested, behind him. A reddish coloration dominates the canvas, coming from the flaming buildings at the background, and they give the painting an Hellish atmosphere. An enormous quantity of tiny skeletons rise from the ground beneath him and start clambering his legs. It seems a metaphor for the victims of the war who now want vengeance from him.

Grosz described the painting as depicting "Hitler as a fascist monster, or as an apocalyptic beast, consumed by his own thoughts."

At the ceremony in 2020 marking the painting's debut in the Deutsches Historisches Museum, Monika Grütters, German Minister of State for Culture, stated that "Since its creation in 1944, the work Cain or Hitler in Hell has lost none of its power ... On the contrary: George Grosz' apocalyptic vision of terror looks like an appeal, like a warning against forgetting, in view of the renewed anti-Semitism in our society. It is works of art like this that help us learn the right lessons from history."
