= A Man Lies Dreaming =

Alternate history novel by Lavie Tidhar

A Man Lies Dreaming is a 2014 alternate history / noir novel by Lavie Tidhar. It was first published by Hodder & Stoughton.

== Synopsis ==
In 1933, Germany became a Communist state. By 1939, a German refugee calling himself "Wolf" is a private detective living in London, who is hired to find a missing Jewish woman. Elsewhere, Shomer Aleichem—an author of pulp fiction—is imprisoned in Auschwitz, and has strange dreams.

== Reception ==
A Man Lies Dreaming was a co-winner of the 2015 Jerwood Fiction Uncovered Prize for best British fiction.

The Telegraph considered that the book's metafictional elements make it "more than a compendium of enjoyably sick jokes", and felt that the Wolf narrative "succeeds as an excellent example of pulp fiction in its own right, with a plot of Chandleresque over-complication". In The Guardian, Adam Roberts called it "a shocking book as well as a rather brilliant one", and "a twisted masterpiece", noting that the Shomer sections "save the novel from becoming simply ludicrous by anchoring it in the reality of suffering". National Public Radio lauded it as "bold and unnerving" and "exhaustively researched", but noted that "some [of the appearances of historical figures] feel gratuitous and even distracting".

Kirkus Reviews praised it as "wild", "good fun", and "as outlandish as it is poignant", while noting that the book "isn't for the weak of heart", due to its explicit descriptions of Wolf being tortured, and of his "sexual proclivities". Publishers Weekly was far more critical, calling it "deadeningly predictable", "a game of spot-the-historical-figure", and "a toothless exercise in What If", and stating that although the premise "sounds provocative and transgressive", its "execution is strictly by the numbers".

Strange Horizons observed that the story was effectively a "revenge fantasy" whose "mockery [of Hitler] isn't subtle", with "direct quotes from Mein Kampf and from [August Kubizek's] The Young Hitler I Knew" — but one in which readers may nonetheless feel sorry for Wolf due to his "degradation" and "mental anguish". In Locus, Gary K. Wolfe praised it as "quite a bit more complex than it at first appears", noting that although there are many science fiction novels pertaining to the Holocaust and its perpetrators, very few of those novels "present Hitler as such an utter failure"; Wolfe did, however, fault Tidhar's narrative tone as anachronistic, as genuine detective fiction of that era was known for its "shrewd indirection regarding sex and violence", and occasionally "Tidhar's prose leaps a decade or so forward from the era of Dashiell Hammett to that of Mickey Spillane."
